= Nicholas II Gutkeled =

Hungarian lord

Nicholas (II) Gutkeled

Judge royal
- Reign: 1273–1274
- Predecessor: Ladislaus Kán
- Successor: Ernye Ákos
- Died: after 1291
- Noble family: gens Gutkeled
- Issue: Ladislaus Majádi; John Majádi
- Father: Stephen I

Nicholas (II) from the kindred Gutkeled (Hungarian: Gutkeled nembeli (II.) Miklós, Croatian: Nikola od Gacke; died after 1291) was a Hungarian lord in the second half of the 13th century, who served as Judge royal from 1273 to 1274. He was also Ban of Slavonia for a brief time in 1275 and from 1278 to 1279, and the first Ban of Croatia in 1275, after the position was separated from the aforementioned dignity.

== Early career ==
Nicholas (II) was born into the Sárvármonostor (Majád) branch of the powerful gens (clan) Gutkeled. He was the eldest son of Stephen (I), Ban of Slavonia and Captain of Styria. He had three brothers, Joachim, Stephen (II) and Paul. The latter two were still minors in 1263.

Nicholas is first mentioned by contemporary records in 1263, when he and his brother Joachim donated the estate Szemefölde in Varaždin County to their servants, Ladislaus and Charles from the Básztély clan. In that year, he was styled as chancellor of the stewards (Latin: cancellarius dapiferorum, which was a minor dignity in the royal court of Béla IV of Hungary, and ispán of the castle district of Kemlék within Križevci County (today Kalnik, Croatia). He still held the latter position in October 1266, which implies he supported the king during the civil war against his son Duke Stephen, unlike Joachim, who defected to the court of the prince. A document from August 1266 narrates that Nicholas objected to an exchange contract between Roland Rátót and the Babonić family regarding the estates Deronicha, Boyna and Stoymerich claiming to have a share in the estates. After the appeal, the exchange was made on the condition that if the king pardoned Stephen's sons (Joachim and his brothers) and returned their estates, the exchange would be nullified. Jenő Szűcs claimed that both Nicholas and Joachim swore loyalty to Stephen in 1264.

Former academic works incorrectly claimed that Nicholas served as Voivode of Transylvania from 1267 to 1270 (actually Nicholas Geregye held that dignity around that time). When Stephen V ascended the Hungarian throne in 1270, it resulted the social advancement of his loyal partisan Joachim, who was made Ban of Slavonia, while Nicholas, Béla's former ally, was marginalized in the political sphere and did not hold any office in the royal court of Stephen V. As a result, Joachim took over the family headship despite the fact that Nicholas was the eldest of the four brothers. Therefore, the theory that Nicholas was Judge royal between 1270 and 1272 are not tenable (it was Nicholas Monoszló who served in this capacity).

== Era of feudal anarchy ==
In the summer of 1272, Joachim kidnapped Ladislaus, the son of and heir to Stephen V, which was an unprecedented case in Hungarian history during that time and marked the beginning of half a century of turbulent period, called "feudal anarchy". After an unsuccessful siege of Koprivnica (Kapronca), where Joachim guarded the child, the monarch died suddenly. Under the minority of Ladislaus IV, Joachim became one of the most powerful lords of the realm allying with the Kőszegis and the Geregyes against the Csák-dominated faction. Nicholas only gained a government role when his brother and his circle expelled several members of the royal council and established a homogeneous "party government" in late 1273. Nicholas was appointed Judge royal and župan of Gacka (Gecske) in the Kingdom of Croatia in December 1273, holding the positions until September 1274 and mid-1275, respectively. Following the Battle of Föveny in late September 1274, the Csák baronial group took supreme power and Nicholas was among those lords who were deprived from positions in the royal court. He retained only the headship in Gacka.

Despite their violent actions against the monarch, the Kőszegis and the Gutkeleds regained their influence and retook the power by the spring of 1275. Nicholas was installed as Ban of Slavonia around early April 1275; he jointly held the dignity with Ivan Kőszegi. Shortly after, the two barons divided the jurisdiction among themselves. Accordingly, Ivan Kőszegi was responsible for the territory between the river Drava and the Kapela Mountains (i.e. Slavonia), while Nicholas Gutkeled administered the region of the Adriatic Coast (i.e. Croatia and Dalmatia) The separate dignity of Ban of Croatia emerged from this after April 1275. Nicholas Gutkeled was styled as "banus maritimus" (April), then "banus totius Croatie et Dalmatie" (June, July, September) and also "banus Croacie" (July) at once time. Nicholas Gutkeled was last styled as Ban of Croatia in September 1275. In one of his judgments, Nicholas returned the estates taken by his father to the city of Trogir (Trau). Upon the "special order" of King Ladislaus, he intended to terminate the hostile relationship between the cities Trogir and Split (Spalato) over the hinterland around Split, but, with a small armed escort, he could not prevent the outbreak of war and the armies of Split and Šibenik (Sebenico) began to besiege Trogir. According to his own report to the king, in order to prevent bloodshed, Nicholas eventually sided with the besiegers, persuading the city to accept humiliating terms. It is plausible that Nicholas's role as ban was highly nominal. The Croatian magnate families began to exercise power independently of the king, taking advantage of the weakness of the central government in Hungary. Following Nicholas' departure, Paul Šubić took the title of ban and he and his family governed all Croatia and the Dalmatian coastal cities for decades de facto independently, practically separating Croatia from the Lands of the Hungarian Crown. Hungarian suzerainty over Croatia was only restored in 1345, exactly seventy years after Nicholas Gutkeled's term.

Joachim was killed in battle in April 1277, when he attempted to eliminate the rebellion that the Babonić family had started in Slavonia. The Babonići plundered many of the Gutkeled possessions in the region. With Joachim's death, the power aspirations of the Gutkeled clan had declined. His brothers, Nicholas and Stephen were not ambitious enough to keep end establish a territorial domain in Slavonia. Joachim's brothers had to compensate their relative Hodos – who lost his left arm and was captured during the skirmish against the Babonići – by donating their palace in Zagreb (from where Joachim administered his province) to him. The Kőszegis and the Babonići divided the spheres of interest in Slavonia between each other, splitting the Gutkeled's province on the border of Transdanubia and Slavonia in their agreement at Dubica on 20 April 1278. The Kőszegis promised that they would not help the Gutkeleds regain their lands, which laid mostly in the newly acquired Babonić territory even if they had "royal authorization" to do so. Since the Kőszegi family rebelled against the king (they supported the claim of pretender Andrew the Venetian), Ladislaus IV sought to isolate them politically. As a result, the monarch ceremonially reconciled with Stephen (II) Gutkeled in June 1278, confirming and returning his landholdings and appointing him Judge royal. Beside that, Nicholas also became Ban of Slavonia at the same time, holding the dignity until the summer of 1279. In this capacity, he granted privileges to the castle warriors of Zagreb in May 1278, which was later confirmed by Ladislaus IV too. Clashes continued in the Slavonian border land between the Gutkeleds and the Babonići even after Joachim's death. Through the peace mediation of Palatine Matthew Csák, Timothy, Bishop of Zagreb and local clergymen, the Gutkeled brothers – Nicholas, Stephen and Paul – reconciled with the Babonići in Zagreb on 6 November 1278. In accordance with the agreement, the Gutkeleds gave up their claim to the castles Steničnjak (Sztenicsnyák) and Krčin (Jhezera) in Zagreb County. In exchange, the Babonići returned the lordship of Zlath (present-day Slavsko Polje) to Nicholas and his brothers. In order to guarantee the preservation of peace, Nicholas offered his two sons, Ladislaus and John, as hostages, sending them to the court of the Babonić family.

== Later life ==
Amid the feud between Ladislaus IV and papal legate Philip of Fermo, Nicholas was replaced as Ban of Slavonia by Peter Tétény in late 1279. Nicholas no longer held baronial position in the royal court. Both Nicholas and Stephen were involved in the conspiracy against Ladislaus IV, when the king was captured in January 1280, in response to his confrontation against the implementation of the Cuman laws and the arrest of Philip. When Ladislaus IV again felt himself strong enough in the second half of 1280, he confiscated certain possessions from the brothers "for their transgression", however, in December 1280, he assured Paul that he would not be harmed because he had not shared with his brothers, so he confirmed him in his possessions in Szabolcs and Szatmár counties.

Along with his brothers, Nicholas possessed Börvely and Tótbörvely in Szatmár County (present-day Berveni, Romania), Tarján and Palkonya in Borsod County, Büd (present-day a borough of Tiszavasvári), Hugyaj, Gerel, Dada and Gáva in Szabolcs County in 1281. In addition, Nicholas also possessed large portions in the lordship of Majád in Sopron County (present-day Sankt Margarethen im Burgenland, Austria). The estates Szentgyörgy, Oszlop (Oslip), Meggyes (Mörbisch am See) and Szabómarton (Eisenstadt) belonged to the lordship. In addition, they also possessed the fort of Bršljanica (Berstyanóc) in Križevci County, Slavonia, which was built by Joachim in the early 1270s. Alongside Bishop Timothy, Nicholas took in the mediation of reconciliation between members of the gens (clan) Monoszló in 1283. Because of their interests in Western Transdanubia, Nicholas and his sons gradually came under the jurisdiction of the Kőszegi province in the 1280s. Nicholas and Paul handed over their fort Egervár to Ivan Kőszegi in Zala County in exchange for Polosnica in Križevci County (Plošćica, ruins in Ivanska, Croatia) in 1288. In the same year, Nicholas and Paul asked back the palace in Zagreb from Hodos, to give that to a Croatian nobleman, comes Gilian, as a gift for his faithful service. When Duke Albert I of Austria invaded the western borderland of Hungary in 1289 as a response to the frequent raids by the Kőszegi family, the Austrian troops besieged and captured the castle of Majád from Nicholas. Nicholas and Paul were among those barons of the realm to whom Pope Nicholas IV sent a letter in 1290, in which he informed them that he had appointed papal legate Benvenuto d'Orvieto and requested them to assist his work in order to persuade Ladislaus IV to return to Christianity. According to historian Mór Wertner, it is possible that Nicholas is identical with that lord, who functioned as ispán of Valkó County in 1291, during the reign of Andrew III of Hungary.

== Descendants ==
His sons John and Ladislaus were mentioned as owners of the Majád (or Szentmargit) lordship in Sopron County in 1291 and 1296, respectively. Bearing the Majádi surname, they divided the estates of the lordship among themselves in 1300. None of them seem to have had any descendants.

== Sources ==
- Engel, Pál (1996). Magyarország világi archontológiája, 1301–1457, I [Secular Archontology of Hungary, 1301–1457, Volume I] (in Hungarian). História, MTA Történettudományi Intézete. ISBN 963-8312-44-0.
- Kiss-Komjáthy, Andor (2023). ""Qui nec ediem regi, nec regno Ungarie fidelis existit". Gutkeled nembeli Joachim személye és szerepe ["Qui nec ediem regi, nec regno Ungarie fidelis existit". The Person and Role of Joachim Gutkeled]". Fons. 30 (3). Szentpétery Imre Történettudományi Alapítvány: 273–310. ISSN 1217-8020.
- Kristó, Gyula (1979). A feudális széttagolódás Magyarországon [Feudal Anarchy in Hungary] (in Hungarian). Akadémiai Kiadó. ISBN 963-05-1595-4.
- Markó, László (2006). A magyar állam főméltóságai Szent Istvántól napjainkig: Életrajzi Lexikon [Great Officers of State in Hungary from King Saint Stephen to Our Days: A Biographical Encyclopedia] (in Hungarian). Helikon Kiadó. ISBN 963-547-085-1.
- Szűcs, Jenő (2002). Az utolsó Árpádok [The Last Árpáds] (in Hungarian). Osiris Kiadó. ISBN 963-389-271-6.
- Zsoldos, Attila (1997). "Téténytől a Hód-tóig. Az 1279 és 1282 közötti évek politikatörténetének vázlata [From Tétény to Hód Lake: Outline of the Political History of the Years Between 1279 and 1282]". Történelmi Szemle (in Hungarian). 39 (1). Hungarian Academy of Sciences: 69–98. ISSN 0040-9634.
- Zsoldos, Attila (2011). Magyarország világi archontológiája, 1000–1301 [Secular Archontology of Hungary, 1000–1301] (in Hungarian). História, MTA Történettudományi Intézete. ISBN 978-963-9627-38-3.

Nicholas II Genus Gutkeled Born: c. 1235 Died: after 1291
Political offices
Preceded by Ladislaus Kán	Judge royal 1273–1274	Succeeded by Ernye Ákos
Preceded by Denis Péc	Ban of Slavonia alongside Ivan Kőszegi; 1275	Succeeded by Ivan Kőszegi
Preceded by first known	Ban of Croatia; 1275	Succeeded by Paul Šubić
Preceded by Nicholas Kőszegi	Ban of Slavonia; 1278–1279	Succeeded by Peter Tétény
