= Stephen II Gutkeled =

Hungarian lord

Stephen (II) Gutkeled

Judge royal
- Reign: 1278–1279
- Predecessor: Julius Rátót
- Successor: Peter Aba
- Born: c. 1250
- Died: 1288
- Noble family: gens Gutkeled
- Father: Stephen I

Stephen (II) from the kindred Gutkeled (Hungarian: Gutkeled nembeli (II.) István; c. 1250 – 1288) was a Hungarian lord in the second half of the 13th century, who served as Judge royal from 1278 to 1279.

== Ancestry ==
Stephen (II) was born into the Sárvármonostor (Majád) branch of the powerful gens (clan) Gutkeled. He was the third son of Stephen (I), Ban of Slavonia and Captain of Styria. His brothers were Nicholas (II), Joachim and Paul. While the former two held petty positions in the royal court of King Béla IV of Hungary in 1263, Stephen (II) and Paul were mentioned as minors in that year. Since Stephen was already among the barons of the realm in 1272 (see below) and his father died in 1260, he was most likely born in the early 1250s.

== Career ==
=== Early career ===
The beginning of his career coincides with the development of feudal anarchy, to which the activities of his brother Joachim contributed greatly. Following the assassination of Béla of Macsó in November 1272, his duchy was divided among the members of the leading noble families. The young Stephen was granted the newly established Banate of Bosnia (not to be confused with the medieval state with the same name), a southern province in the Kingdom of Hungary. He held the office until May 1273, when Dowager Queen Elizabeth the Cuman temporarily took control of the royal council on behalf of his minor son, King Ladislaus IV of Hungary, but soon he was restored as Ban of Bosnia within days or weeks. He was succeeded by Egidius Monoszló after another change of government amidst the Bohemian invasion of Hungary.

Joachim was killed in battle in April 1277, when he attempted to eliminate the rebellion that the Babonić family had started in Slavonia. The Babonići plundered many of the Gutkeled possessions in the region. With Joachim's death, the power aspirations of the Gutkeled clan had declined. His brothers, Nicholas and Stephen were not ambitious enough to keep end establish a territorial domain in Slavonia. Joachim's brothers – Nicholas, Stephen and Paul – had to compensate their relative Hodos – who lost his left arm and was captured during the skirmish against the Babonići – by donating their palace in Zagreb (from where Joachim administered his province) to him. The Kőszegis and the Babonići divided the spheres of interest in Slavonia between each other, splitting the Gutkeled's province on the border of Transdanubia and Slavonia in their agreement at Dubica on 20 April 1278. The Kőszegis promised that they would not help the Gutkeleds regain their lands, which laid mostly in the newly acquired Babonić territory even if they had "royal authorization" to do so.

=== Royal baron ===
Since the Kőszegi family rebelled against the king (they supported the claim of pretender Andrew the Venetian), Ladislaus IV sought to isolate them politically. As a result, the monarch ceremonially reconciled with Stephen (II) Gutkeled on 19 June 1278, during their meeting at Csanád in Temes County (present-day Cenad, Romania). Several prelates and barons attended the event. During the act, King Ladislaus appointed Stephen as Judge royal and ispán of Moson County (with an annual revenue of 1,000 marks). The monarch also returned all inherited and acquired estates to Stephen, which had belonged to Joachim prior to his death, including the initially royal domain Hátszeg in Hunyad County (Hațeg, Romania), and also Majád in Sopron County (present-day Sankt Margarethen im Burgenland, Austria), in addition to Hutina (Hotwon), Sopnica (Sepnec) and Borsonóc (Borsonuch), all laid in Slavonia (Zagreb and Križevci counties). Since Gyula Pauler, several historians considered that Stephen Gutkeled was a commander of the Hungarian forces in the Battle on the Marchfeld on 26 August 1278, alongside Matthew Csák, identifying him with Stephan von Schiltberg, whose name appears in Ottokar aus der Gaal's Steirische Reimchronik. However, it can be translated as "Stephen from the Vértes Hills", thus the commander is identical with Stephen Csák, Matthew's brother. Through the peace mediation of Palatine Matthew Csák, Timothy, Bishop of Zagreb and local clergymen, the Gutkeled brothers – Nicholas, Stephen and Paul – reconciled with the Babonići in Zagreb on 6 November 1278. In accordance with the agreement, the Gutkeleds gave up their claim to the castles Steničnjak (Sztenicsnyák) and Krčin (Jhezera) in Zagreb County. In exchange, the Babonići returned the lordship of Zlath (present-day Slavsko Polje) to Stephen and his brothers.

Stephen was replaced as Judge royal and ispán of Moson County in the summer of 1279. Around the same time, Nicholas also lost his position of Ban of Slavonia amid the feud between Ladislaus IV and papal legate Philip of Fermo over the Cuman question. Both Nicholas and Stephen were involved in the conspiracy against Ladislaus IV, when the king was captured in January 1280, in response to his confrontation against the implementation of the Cuman laws and the arrest of Philip. When Ladislaus IV again felt himself strong enough in the second half of 1280, he confiscated certain possessions from the brothers "for their transgression", however, in December 1280, he assured Paul that he would not be harmed because he had not shared with his brothers, so he confirmed him in his possessions in Szabolcs and Szatmár counties. Along with his brothers, Stephen possessed Börvely and Tótbörvely in Szatmár County (present-day Berveni, Romania), Tarján and Palkonya in Borsod County, Büd (present-day a borough of Tiszavasvári), Hugyaj, Gerel, Dada and Gáva in Szabolcs County in 1281. In addition, they also possessed the fort of Bršljanica (Berstyanóc) in Križevci County, Slavonia, which was built by Joachim in the early 1270s. Because of the political turmoil in Slavonia due to the aggressive expansion by both Kőszegis and Babonići, the Majád lordship around Lake Neusiedl (Fertő) became the main residence of Stephen. He founded the settlement Bánfalva in Moson County (lit. "Ban's Village', present-day Apetlon, Austria), inviting German settlers. Stephen and Paul were granted the land Haragissa in Ung County by Ladislaus IV in 1283. Stephen acted a ius patron of the clan monastery of Csatár (in Zala County) in 1284.

Having regained his influence, Stephen served as Ban of Slavonia sometime in the 1280s. According to a royal charter of Ladislaus IV without specific year (issued in Buda on 13 April), Stephen, as Ban of Slavonia, donated the aforementioned palace in Zagreb to comes Gilian, as a gift for his faithful service. Croatian historian Ivan Tkalčić placed this event in 1288, but in that year, Ladislaus stayed in Szepesség in Upper Hungary. Initially, Attila Zsoldos considered that Stephen perhaps functioned as Ban of Slavonia in the first half of 1280, following the brief imprisonment of Ladislaus IV. In May 1280, Ladislaus IV ordered this Stephen to recover the land Lapatk – which was unlawfully seized by Bachaler Olaszkai – for its rightful owners and defend their interests. Later, Zsoldos considered that Stephen served as Ban of Slavonia in 1286, excluding several other years based on Ladislaus' stays and the list of office holders between 1280 and 1288. Tamás Kádár, in contrast, placed Stephen's tenure in office in 1283, trying to synchronize the two royal charters.

== Death ==
Stephen died childless in 1288, as from then on his brothers were involved in important family matters without him. In that year, Nicholas and Paul asked back the palace in Zagreb from Hodos. In June 1291, when Stephen is first mentioned as a deceased person, Paul handed over the palace to comes Gilian. Stephen's lands were inherited by the sons of Paul. His unidentified widow joined the Dominican nuns of Margaret Island. She received her dower (a portion in Dada) from Paul's sons in 1300.

== Sources ==
- Engel, Pál (1996). Magyarország világi archontológiája, 1301–1457, I [Secular Archontology of Hungary, 1301–1457, Volume I] (in Hungarian). História, MTA Történettudományi Intézete. ISBN 963-8312-44-0.
- Kádár, Tamás (2016). "IV. László király itineráriuma (1264–[1272]–1290) [The Itinerary of King Ladislaus IV (1264–[1272]–1290)]". Fons. 23 (1). Szentpétery Imre Történettudományi Alapítvány: 3–64. ISSN 1217-8020.
- Kiss-Komjáthy, Andor (2023). ""Qui nec ediem regi, nec regno Ungarie fidelis existit". Gutkeled nembeli Joachim személye és szerepe ["Qui nec ediem regi, nec regno Ungarie fidelis existit". The Person and Role of Joachim Gutkeled]". Fons. 30 (3). Szentpétery Imre Történettudományi Alapítvány: 273–310. ISSN 1217-8020.
- Markó, László (2006). A magyar állam főméltóságai Szent Istvántól napjainkig: Életrajzi Lexikon [Great Officers of State in Hungary from King Saint Stephen to Our Days: A Biographical Encyclopedia] (in Hungarian). Helikon Kiadó. ISBN 963-547-085-1.
- Rudolf, Veronika (2023). Közép-Európa a hosszú 13. században [Central Europe in the Long 13th Century] (in Hungarian). Arpadiana XV., Research Centre for the Humanities. ISBN 978-963-416-406-7.
- Szűcs, Jenő (2002). Az utolsó Árpádok [The Last Árpáds] (in Hungarian). Osiris Kiadó. ISBN 963-389-271-6.
- Zsoldos, Attila (1997). "Téténytől a Hód-tóig. Az 1279 és 1282 közötti évek politikatörténetének vázlata [From Tétény to Hód Lake: Outline of the Political History of the Years Between 1279 and 1282]". Történelmi Szemle (in Hungarian). 39 (1). Hungarian Academy of Sciences: 69–98. ISSN 0040-9634.
- Zsoldos, Attila (2011). Magyarország világi archontológiája, 1000–1301 [Secular Archontology of Hungary, 1000–1301] (in Hungarian). História, MTA Történettudományi Intézete. ISBN 978-963-9627-38-3.

Stephen II Genus Gutkeled Born: c. 1250 Died: 1288
Political offices
New title	Ban of Bosnia; 1272–1273	Succeeded by Egidius Monoszló
Preceded by Egidius Monoszló	Ban of Bosnia; 1273	Succeeded by Egidius Monoszló
Preceded by Julius Rátót	Judge royal 1278–1279	Succeeded by Peter Aba
Preceded by Ivan Kőszegi	Ban of Slavonia; 1286	Succeeded by Nicholas Kőszegi
