= Stephen I Gutkeled =

Hungarian lord (died 1260)

Stephen (I) Gutkeled
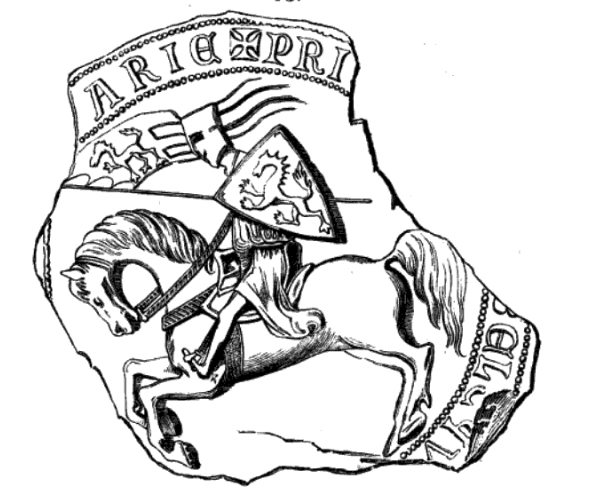
- Seal of Stephen Gutkeled, 1254

Palatine of Hungary
- Reign: 1246–1248
- Predecessor: Denis Türje
- Successor: Denis Türje
- Died: 1260
- Noble family: gens Gutkeled
- Issue: Nicholas II; Joachim; Stephen II; Paul
- Father: Dragun

Stephen (I) from the kindred Gutkeled (Hungarian: Gutkeled nembeli (I.) István, German: Stephan von Agram; died 1260) was a Hungarian influential lord, an early prominent member of the gens Gutkeled and ancestor of its Majád branch. He governed the Duchy of Styria on behalf of claimants Duke Béla and Duke Stephen from 1254 until his death.

== Origin and family relations ==
Coat of arms of the gens Gutkeled

Stephen was born into the Gutkeled kindred, a widely extended clan of German origin, which came from the Duchy of Swabia to the Kingdom of Hungary during the reign of Peter in the mid-11th century, according to Simon of Kéza's Gesta Hunnorum et Hungarorum. Stephen's father was a certain comes Dragun from the clan's Sárvármonostor branch. Powerful barons Nicholas I and Apaj Gutkeled were Dragun's cousins however all of their ancestors can not be identified thus there is inability to connect the Sárvármonostor branch to the other branches of the clan. Stephen was the only known son of Dragun. Based on his father's name, it is possible that the Sárvármonostor branch married into the local Slavic elite in Slavonia, where the aforementioned branch possessed acquisitions and increased its influence.

He is considered as forefather and first member of the Majád branch. He had four sons from his unidentified wife: Nicholas II, Joachim, Stephen II and Paul. All of them held important positions, e.g. Judge royal, Master of the treasury, Judge royal and Ban of Severin, respectively. Through his youngest son Paul, Stephen was also an ancestor of the Majádi, Butkai, Keszeg de Butka, Márki, Málcai, Csatári, Ráskai, Fejes de Ráska and Vidfi de Ráska noble families.

Joachim, his second son was one of the most infamous early oligarchs during the chaotic reign of Ladislaus IV in the 1270s. He even kidnapped the young Ladislaus and established a dominion in Slavonia, excluding the royal power. Following his death in 1277, his province was divided between the Kőszegis and Babonići, thus the Majád branch declined while other branches of the Gutkeled clan (for instance Rakamaz branch, where the prestigious Báthory family originated) has become increasingly important.

== Career ==
=== Career in Hungary ===
Stephen served in the royal court "since his childhood" ("in primevis puericie sue") and plausibly he belonged to the group of so-called "royal youth" (Hungarian: királyi ifjak, Latin: iuvenis noster). He started his political career at the ducal court of Andrew, Prince of Galicia, the youngest son of King Andrew II, where he served from 1227 to 1230 and from 1231 to 1234. In this capacity, he fought against Daniel Romanovich and his allies. When the young prince died without child in 1234, Stephen left the Principality of Galicia. Following the death of King Andrew II in the next year, he became a loyal supporter of Béla IV, who ascended the Hungarian throne in 1235. He was a confidant of Duke Coloman as a member of his ducal court in Slavonia. When the Mongols raided Hungary in 1241, Stephen had participated in the Battle of Mohi where the Hungarian royal army suffered a catastrophic defeat against Batu Khan's troops. He was able to flee from the battlefield and later joined the companion of the escaping Béla IV who fled to Dalmatia after a short and unfortune bypass in the Duchy of Austria.

After the death of William of Saint Omer, the King's distant relative, Stephen was appointed Master of the horse around August 1242. He held the dignity until at least October 1244, but there is a non-authentic charter which suggests he served in that capacity until 1245. Beside that Stephen also functioned as ispán/župan of Vrbas (or Orbász) County from 1243 to 1244/5, otherwise he is the first known noble, who held that ispánate in Lower Slavonia. From 1245 to 1246, he served as Judge royal and ispán of Nyitra County. During his service, he was granted lands in the aforementioned county. At the time of his service as Judge royal, he participated in the Battle of the Leitha River in June 1246, where Frederick II, Duke of Austria was killed and the male line of the Babenbergs became extinct. Stephen was seriously injured during the skirmish.

In 1246, he was appointed Palatine of Hungary by Béla IV, replacing Denis Türje. He functioned in that position until 1247 or 1248. During that time, in 1246, he also governed Somogy County. Three charters preserved that Stephen judged in Bela, Szántó (Zala County) and Baksa (Baranya County) over litigation cases. From the 1230s, the monarchs occasionally entrusted the palatines, along with other barons of the realm, with specific tasks. For instance, Stephen Gutkeled and ispán Csák Hahót ordered to destroy mills built without permission on the river Rába on Béla IV's orders. This latter certificate is the only surviving document that Stephen issued during his service as palatine.

=== Ban/Duke of Slavonia ===
In 1248, Stephen became Ban of Slavonia, a position which he held for a 12-year term, until his death. He adopted the title of dux in 1252, after Béla IV bestowed the title upon him, emphasizing the continuity of the ducal separate government over Slavonia. His proper title was "Ban and Duke of Slavonia", according to a royal charter issued in 1254. Sometime, he was also called as "duke of Zagreb" (dux Zagrabiensis), he appeared with this title in Styrian chronicles, therefore Austrian historiography frequently calls him "Stephan von Agram". It is plausible that Stephen's ducal title should not be considered a personal prestige, but it served to create the legal basis for large-scale supervision process of the possessions and social statuses in the province for the royal court. Stephen exercised sovereign rights in these. Following the Mongol invasion, the province of Slavonia and Croatia had an important function of border defense, as a result the royal title of Duke of Slavonia was transformed into the hands of powerful secular barons, like Denis Türje and Stephen Gutkeled, while the King's son, Duke Stephen was still a minor. In Slavonia, Stephen acted as Béla's viceroy, according to a royal charter in 1248. In a letter to the burghers of Trogir (Trau) in the same year, the king, who announced Stephen's appointment, referred to his protege as "a man after our own heart, who will not be a destroyer but a builder, not a spendthrift but a gatherer, not a destructive but rather a great preserver through his inherent loyalty and wisdom". With this appointment, Béla IV granted special rights to Stephen over the affairs of Trogir and Split (Spalato), in addition other cities of the Dalmatian coast. The king ordered Stephen not to violate the rights and freedoms of the burghers of Trogir in the course of administering justice in the lawsuit between Trogir and Šibenik (Sebenico) over the collection of some tithes.

Under Stephen's term, more and more sources identified the river Drava as the northeastern border of the Banate of Slavonia, but this was not a strict political boundary since the territories of southern Transdanubian counties (Zala, Somogy and Baranya) extended beyond the river line. Stephen resided in Zagreb and governed the region from his palace there, where he also had an own ducal court. He built up a vassal system in Slavonia, royal servants and familiaris were among his household. His most important familiares were Dominic, who served as vice-judge royal (1246) then vice-ban (1249) under Stephen, and Alexander, who was ispán of Podgorje, Zagreb and also served as vice-ban from 1252 to 1259. In 1256, Benedict, the Canon of Zagreb represented Stephen in the mintage and chamber at Pakrac.

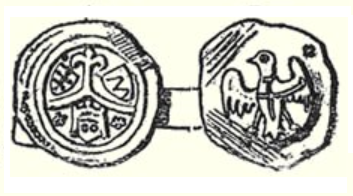
Banovac coins of Ban Stephen Gutkeled (1255)

Following the sudden death of Ugrin Csák, Archbishop of Split, King Béla IV installed Stephen as comes (ispán or župan) of Split in 1249, who thus became the supreme representative of secular affairs of the royal power in Dalmatia. Stephen's appointment clearly violated the rights of the burghers of Split to freely elect their leaders. Stephen temporarily handed over the title of comes of Split to a certain Mihailo in 1251 (who, however, acted "with the consent" of Stephen); he reassumed control of the city's administration from 1252 to 1258. Stephen is last referred to as comes of Split in September 1258. Stephen was also styled as comes of Trogir at least since 1253. He bore that title at least until 1257. Since 1259, certain Alexander and Butko (Butheco) appeared as bans of the maritime provinces (i.e. Dalmatia), implying Stephen's retirement from the region shortly before his death. It is possible that Stephen gave up both positions in 1258, when the Dalmatian affairs were transferred to the authority of the aforementioned bans. Consequently, Stephen outsourced the administration of the Dalmatian cities to his familiars, the (vice)-bans of the maritime provinces. Nevertheless, Ban Stephen was embroiled in conflict with several Dalmatian towns during his decade of rule, for instance, his son Ban Nicholas Gutkeled commemorated an event, when his father unlawfully usurped lands from the town of Trogir. According to historian Gyula Kristó, these were acts of domination of later oligarchic practices, but it is possible that Stephen was protecting the king's interests over the cities as he sought to increase the influence of royal power in the region.

In addition to Dalmatia, Stephen Gutkeled also brought order with hard hand to the warring Croatian lords beyond the Kapela Mountains. He acted in a similar way in the region between rivers Kupa and Una, defeating the progenitors of the Babonić family. Stephen built several castles (including Jablanac) along the borders as part of Béla's radical reforms introduced after the Mongol invasion. He also resettled with hospites ("guests" or "foreigners") the town of Križevci and donated privileges to the newly inhabited settlement. He granted city status to Križevci in 1252, with the same rights that Zagreb had. Stephen was the first secular landowner in Hungary, who founded a settlement, when he settled down the inhabitants of the Rab Island (Arbe) to along the walls of the Jablanac Castle in 1251. Stephen's re-settlements were highly valued by Béla IV, who considered them the basis of the stability of the province. Stephen granted the same privileges to its burghers as the people of Trogir, Šibenik and other coastal cities in Dalmatia (for instance, the free elect of comes, the local superior, exemption from customs duties and restricting external immigration). Béla IV mandated Stephen to supervise former royal land grants in the province Slavonia. He dealt with this task in the period between April 1255 and early 1257. This was necessary because after the death of Duke Coloman, chaotic conditions developed in the province.

Stephen Gutkeled was also notable for the first Ban, who minted his own marten-adorned silver denarius in whole Slavonia, the so-called banovac or banski denar. The first coins were issued in 1255 by the Pakrac Chamber, according to a 1256 royal charter of Béla IV. Stephen's coins marked Styrian influence, as historian Bálint Hóman writes in his high-impact work in 1916. Stephen's goal was to the displace of Austrian coins from his province. Later the mintage's seat moved from Pakrac to Zagreb by 1260. His banovac was considered a high quality currency and when the minting of golden coins began under Charles I of Hungary in 1323, Gutkeled's coins served as an example and base for the new florins. The self-coinage of the Ban of Slavonia (and Croatia) have persisted until the 1350s. Stephen also introduced a new economic measure called collecta, an extraordinary tax of 7 denari in Slavonia, also a kind of precursor for Charles' economic reform in the 1320s.

=== Captain of Styria ===
==== Administration ====
Béla IV, in accordance with a treaty in Pressburg (today Bratislava in Slovakia), acquired the Duchy of Styria from his rival Ottokar II of Bohemia on 1 May 1254 after a series of wars. Stephen Gutkeled was among the Hungarian dignitaries, who drafted and ratified the peace points in the agreement between the two realms in the previous month in Buda, under the mediation of papal legate Bernadino Caracciolo dei Rossi, Bishop of Naples. Subsequently, Stephen Gutkeled was installed Captain (i.e. governor) of Styria (Latin: capitaneus Stirie) in that year, while also retained the dignity of Ban and Duke of Slavonia. Some 19th-century academic works incorrectly identified the captain with Stephen Šubić. Historian Veronika Rudolf emphasized that the long common border between Slavonia and Styria made Stephen Gutkeled an ideal candidate for the position, who had extensive local knowledge in the area. In this process, Slavonia served as a hinterland for him, which facilitated the transfer of material and human resources to administer the new territory. Regarding his charters dealing with Styrian affairs, Stephen used the title "banus, dux (totius) Sclavonie ac capitaneus Styrie" and, a single time, "dominus dux Zagrabie ac capitaneus Styrie gloriosus". Stephen first appeared as captain in the conquered province only in the autumn of 1254. He convened his first Landtaiding (provincial assembly) in Feldkirchen on 10 September 1254. A charter with brief note implies, however, that Stephen already resided in Styria in July. Subsequent assemblies were summoned to Graz in January 1255 and Leoben in May 1257, both presided by Stephen Gutkeled. After 1257, Stephen Gutkeled often stayed in the province for months, whereas before he appeared at most once a year, only in Graz. This phenomenon reflects that Stephen gradually consolidated his rule and slightly extended his influence over the northern parts of Styria by that year.

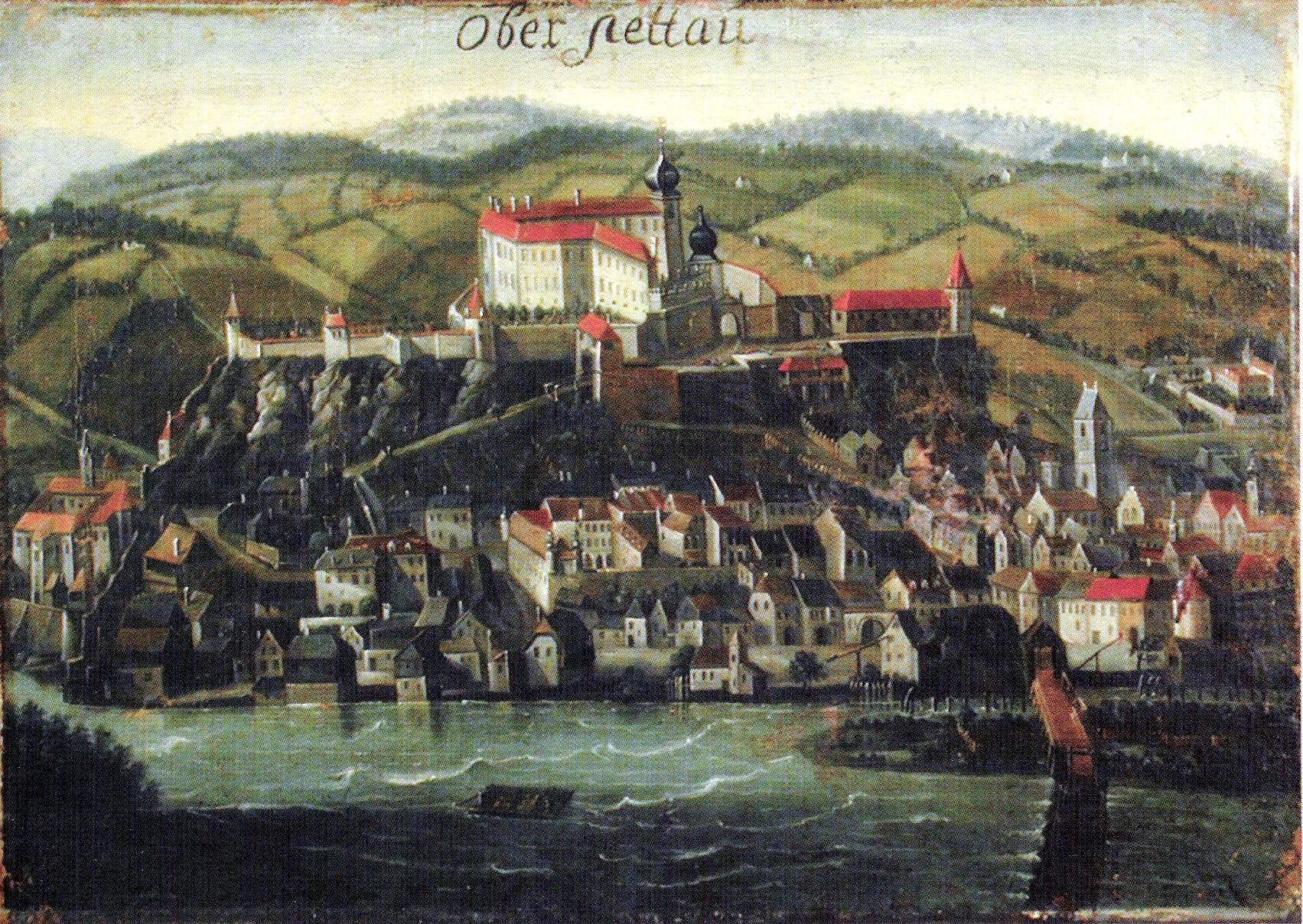
Stephen Gutkeled governed Styria from Pettau Castle between 1254 and 1260

Veronika Rudolf emphasized that Stephen's title reflects the continuity of the system of Landeshauptmann adopted by Frederick II, Holy Roman Emperor, thus Béla IV tried to adapt the government system to local conditions. Stephen Gutkeled governed the occupied province from Pettau Castle (today Ptuj, Slovenia) on behalf of Béla, who adopted the title Duke of Styria, contesting Ottokar's claims. During his reign, Stephen supported the local church and the nobility in Lower Styria, but some of the nobility from Upper Styria also joined to his league by the end of 1256. In contrast, Veronika Rudolf considered that Stephen Gutkeled held his administration centre in Graz. Under Stephen Gutkeled, those local nobles and ministeriales, who supported Hungarian rule, were appointed to the most senior positions in Styria. For instance, Gottfried von Marburg was installed as provincial judge, while Berthold von Treun, then Frederick V von Pettau became marshals of Styria. According to Rudolf, both Gottfried and Frederick carried the daily affairs between two provincial assemblies when Stephen mostly did not reside in Styria. Beside that, there were also Hungarian officials in Styria, but only to a limited extent. Ladislaus, the bishop of Knin is mentioned once as a member of Stephen's household in 1254, while some historians (Othmar Karrer) argued that Frank Locsmándi functioned as a deputy of Stephen Gutkeled during the Hungarian years, who also acted as a special envoy of Béla IV in possessions cases along the Styrian–Hungarian border. Beside Pettau, the fort of Bad Radkersburg was also an important stronghold of the Hungarian rule; for instance, barons Roland Rátót and Denis Türje made a judgment in a Hungarian lawsuit there in 1255.

The Hungarian administration led by Stephen tried to end the anarchic period after the extinction of the Babenberg dynasty. In most cases, the agendas of the provincial assemblies included compensation and the mediation of disputes. Temporary confiscation took place in only two cases, according to surviving sources. Stephen's administration especially protected the churches and monastic orders, also confirming their privileges. Consequently, the Styrian clergymen, headed by Bishop Ulrich I of Seckau emphatically supported Hungarian rule over the duchy. With these favours, Béla IV and Stephen Gutkeled attempted to counterbalance Philip of Spanheim, who was elected Archbishop of Salzburg and who did not support Hungarian rule in Styria at all. In addition to the church, Stephen's governance was supported by ministeriales primarily in the southern and central region, in the area around Graz and along the river Drava near the Slavonian border (e.g. von Pettau, von Wildon and von Treun families). Some influential families, including the Stubenbergs and the Pfannbergs did not recognize Stephen's legitimacy, but they were clearly in the minority.

==== Rebellions ====
However, Stephen was unable to consolidate the Hungarian rule in Styria. For unknown reasons, Stephen Gutkeled summoned Siegfried von Mahrenberg, one of the ministeriales to his seat Graz, who, however, refused to appear before his court. Thereafter, the captain marched into Mahrenberg (today Radlje ob Dravi, Slovenia) and besieged the fort with his army. The Steirische Reimchronik claims that Stephen was chasing "military glory", after "he had been told all kinds of lies about the lord of Mahrenberg". Austrian historian Gerhard Pferschy considered that Stephen Gutkeled wanted to secure the road to Carinthia by occupying the castle in order to provide assistance to the Bavarians in their defense war against Ottokar II. Unexpectedly, the Styrian noblemen along the river Drava with the leadership of the Pettau brothers, Frederick V and Hartnid II, and also Berthold von Treun, rose up in rebellion against Stephen Gutkeled and routed him in early 1258. Stephen Gutkeled unsuccessfully besieged his former seat, Pettau in the first half of the year, defended by Siegfried von Mahrenberg, who defeated the Hungarian troops. Ban Stephen could barely escape from the battlefield, when he swam across the Drava along with his horse. The Steirische Reimchronik writes that Stephen fled to Marburg (today Maribor, Slovenia) being chased by the army of Hartnid von Pettau. Thereafter, he fled further to Ankenstein (today Grad Borl, Slovenia), where he sought assistance from Duke Stephen, the son of Béla IV.

Several Austrian chronicles – for instance, Ottokar aus der Gaal's Steirische Reimchronik ("Styrian Rhyming Chronicle"), John of Viktring and the Chronicon rhythmicum Austriacum ("Austrian Rhyming Chronicle") – indicated the oppression of the Styrians, the newly imposed high taxes and the violent Hungarian rule as the causes of the rebellion. Several historians, including Gyula Pauler, Bálint Hóman, Othmar Karrer and Richard Marsina accepted this argument. Other scholars referred to the unreliability of Ottokar aus der Gaal, for whom the oppression of the Styrians appears as a permanent topos. In addition, his work contains many factual errors regarding Stephen Gutkeled's governorship. For instance, the Steirische Reimchronik claims that Stephen Gutkeled "was a disdainful man who was a burden to everyone, who loudly proclaimed that his lord [Béla] had bought this country [Styria]." The author claims that Stephen always broke the rules of decorum (his frequent topos regarding the Hungarians) and his daughter called Graetze was born during his reign as captain. The work incorrectly states that Stephen Gutkeled was soon replaced by Hahold IV Hahót as captain of Styria. Therefore, several historians, e.g. Gerhard Pferschy or Jenő Szűcs, proposed that the Hungarians excessively favored the churches and ruled against the nobles and ministeriales in many compensation proceedings. Veronika Rudolf emphasized that there is no trace of widespread social discontent in contemporary sources. Stephen's frequent absences may also have contributed to the development of the rebellion, while Ottokar paid special attention to his new acquisitions in Austria. Historian Gyula Kristó considered that the failure of the Hungarian administration was caused by the Bohemians' counter-propaganda and activity.

Stephen Gutkeled had to flee Styria, however Béla and his son, Duke Stephen jointly invaded Styria with mostly Cuman auxiliary troops in June 1258, in order to restore his suzerainty. The Hungarian royal army besieged and occupied Mahrenberg, then Pettau in late June or early July. Simultaneously, a small unit captured Königsberg south of the Drava (today Kunšperk, Slovenia). In order to avoid bloodshed, Ulrich of Seckau pledged the castle of Pettau for 3,000 silver marks to Béla IV. Their campaign was also connected to the war of succession between Philip of Spanheim and Ulrich of Seckau for the Archdiocese of Salzburg. In September 1258, Ulrich's army of 500 soldiers was suffered a heavy defeat from the troops of Philip at Radstadt. Thereafter, Ulrich returned to Styria.

Béla appointed his oldest son, Stephen as the new Duke of Styria following the suppression of the rebellion. The new duke established his ducal court in Pettau. Although Stephen Gutkeled continuously bore the title captain of Styria, but he was given a much smaller role beside the duke's personal presence, and he no longer assumed a real power in the administration of the province. Duke Stephen and his captain, Stephen Gutkeled launched a plundering raid in Carinthia in the spring of 1259, in retaliation of Duke Ulrich III of Carinthia's (brother of Archbishop Philip) support of the Styrian rebels. Shortly thereafter the province lost for the Hungarians, when the Styrian lords sought assistance from Ottokar and vanquished the Hungarian army in the Battle of Kressenbrunn on 12 June 1260. Stephen Gutkeled also took part in the battle, according to a royal charter from 1263, proving that he was still alive then. He died sometime in the second half of 1260.

== Possessions ==
For his loyal services, Stephen Gutkeled was granted several lands during his decades-long career. Béla IV donated the estates Bölgyén (present-day a borough of Topoľčany in Slovakia), Szolcsán (Solčianky), Nyárhíd (today a borough of Nové Zámky) and Bosmán in Nyitra County to Stephen in 1245. Later, Stephen exchanged the latter two possessions for Hrenóc (Chrenovec) and Perjés (Prašice) in the same county. Still in that year, Béla IV donated the estates Halász, Timár, Nagyfalu and Gáva in Szabolcs County to his partisan, which areas were then uninhabited after the Mongol invasion and originally belonged to the accessories of the royal castle of Szabolcs. Stephen repopulated these settlements in the following years. Stephen bought the lordship of Széplak (today Mintiu Gherlii, Romania) along the river Szamos (Someș) from his relative Paul Gutkeled (from the clan's Szilágy or Lothard branch) in 1246, who had to redeem himself after being captured in the war against Duke Frederick II. The lordship then consisted of four villages, Széplak, Mikó, Álos and Ugróc (today Ugruțiu, Romania), in addition to a small fort. Later, however, Stephen exchanged these lands with his relatives in order to expand the Majád lordship in Sopron County (today Sankt Margarethen im Burgenland, Austria). With this exchange, Paul became the owner of the clan's lordship at Aranyos (Arieș). In 1250, Stephen donated his estate Futak in Bács County to the monastery of Sárvár that the money raised be used to restore its buildings.

Following his appointment as Ban of Slavonia, he acquired lands in that province too. He was granted the estate Zlath (present-day Slavsko Polje) which laid between rivers Kupa and Una and another estates called Vrh and Grahova near Knin in 1251. He acquired landholdings and villages near Zrin too (Bajna, Szeronica and Sztojmeric). It is possible he or his sons built the castle of Sjeničak Lasinjski (Sztenicsnyák) near Karlovac in Zagreb County. He also possessed portions in the Gutkeled clan's ancient estate Gút in Fejér County after a purchase in 1254. Stephen bought Dada in Szabolcs County in the same year. He purchased estates along the river Bodrog in Zemplén County too.

Although the achievements and land acquisitions of Stephen Gutkeled were instrumental in the rise of his family's oligarchic province, his devotion and loyalty to his monarch remained unquestionable during his lifetime.

== Sources ==
=== Primary sources ===
- Gaal, Ottokar aus der (2023). Stájer rímes krónika [Styrian Rhyming Chronicle] (in Hungarian). Translated by Bagi, Dániel; Orsós, Júlia. Arpadiana XI., Research Centre for the Humanities. ISBN 978-615-5133-24-4.

=== Secondary sources ===
- Bradács, Gábor (2016). "Gutkeled nembeli István szlavón bán és István ifjabb király harcai a salzburgi érsekségért vívott háborúban (1258–1259)". In Pósán, László; Veszprémy, László (eds.). Elfeledett háborúk. Középkori csaták és várostromok (6–16. század) (in Hungarian). Zrínyi Kiadó. pp. 171–197. ISBN 978-963-3276-96-9.
- Gál, Judit (2020). Dalmatia and the Exercise of Royal Authority in the Árpád-Era Kingdom of Hungary. Arpadiana III., Research Centre for the Humanities. ISBN 978-963-416-227-8.
- Karácsonyi, János (1901). A magyar nemzetségek a XIV. század közepéig. II. kötet [The Hungarian genera until the middle of the 14th century, Vol. 2] (in Hungarian). Hungarian Academy of Sciences.
- Kiss-Komjáthy, Andor (2025). "„De mandato domini Bele regis" – Gutkeled nembeli Dragun fia István pályafutása [„De mandato domini Bele regis": The Career of Stephen, son of Dragun from the Gutkeled Kindred]". In Kováč, Szilárd; Sütő, Botond (eds.). Magister historiae V. (in Hungarian). Eötvös Loránd University. pp. 57–88. ISBN 978-963-489-843-6.
- Kristó, Gyula (1979). A feudális széttagolódás Magyarországon [Feudal Anarchy in Hungary] (in Hungarian). Akadémiai Kiadó. ISBN 963-05-1595-4.
- Kristó, Gyula (2003). Háborúk és hadviselés az Árpádok korában [Wars and Tactics under the Árpáds] (in Hungarian). Szukits Könyvkiadó. ISBN 963-9441-87-2.
- Markó, László (2006). A magyar állam főméltóságai Szent Istvántól napjainkig: Életrajzi Lexikon [Great Officers of State in Hungary from King Saint Stephen to Our Days: A Biographical Encyclopedia] (in Hungarian). Helikon Kiadó. ISBN 963-208-970-7.
- Rudolf, Veronika (2023). Közép-Európa a hosszú 13. században [Central Europe in the Long 13th Century] (in Hungarian). Arpadiana XV., Research Centre for the Humanities. ISBN 978-963-416-406-7.
- Szőcs, Tibor (2014). A nádori intézmény korai története, 1000–1342 [An Early History of the Palatinal Institution: 1000–1342] (in Hungarian). Magyar Tudományos Akadémia Támogatott Kutatások Irodája. ISBN 978-963-508-697-9.
- Szűcs, Jenő (2002). Az utolsó Árpádok [The Last Árpáds] (in Hungarian). Osiris Kiadó. ISBN 963-389-271-6.
- Weisz, Boglárka (2010). "A zágrábi kamara az Árpádok korában [The Chamber of Zagreb in the Árpád age]". Középkortörténeti tanulmányok 6 (in Hungarian). University of Szeged. pp. 327–335.
- Zsoldos, Attila (2011). Magyarország világi archontológiája, 1000–1301 [Secular Archontology of Hungary, 1000–1301] (in Hungarian). História, MTA Történettudományi Intézete. ISBN 978-963-9627-38-3.

Stephen I Genus Gutkeled Born: ? Died: 1260
Political offices
Preceded by William of Saint Omer	Master of the horse 1242–1245	Succeeded by Csák Hahót
Preceded by Demetrius Csák	Judge royal 1245–1246	Succeeded by Ladislaus Kán
Preceded by Denis Türje	Palatine of Hungary; 1246–1248	Succeeded by Denis Türje
Preceded by Rostislav Mikhailovich	Ban of Slavonia; 1248–1260	Succeeded by Roland Rátót
Preceded by Meinhard von Gorizia	Captain of Styria; 1254–1260	Succeeded by Heinrich von Liechtenstein
