= Hodos Gutkeled =

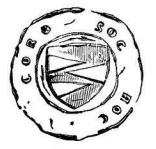
- Seal of Hodos Gutkeled, 1272

Ispán of Zagreb
- Reign: 1270–1272
- Predecessor: Derek
- Successor: Peter
- Died: after 1291
- Noble family: gens Gutkeled
- Issue: Ladislaus; Lawrence

Hodos from the kindred Gutkeled (Hungarian: Gutkeled nembeli Hodos; died after 1291) was a Hungarian lord in the second half of the 13th century, who served as ispán of Zagreb County from 1270 to 1272.

== Family ==
Hodos (or Hudus) was born into the Rakamaz branch of the influential and rich gens (clan) Gutkeled. His parentage is unknown. He had two brothers, Andrew "the Bald" – forefather of all branches of the powerful Báthory family – and Stephen. Hodos had two sons, Ladislaus and Lawrence. The former was ancestor of the Szakolyi (later Szokoli or Szokoly) noble family.

== Career ==
Hodos entered the service of his distant relative Joachim Gutkeled, who served as Ban of Slavonia and was one of the most powerful barons of the realm in the 1270s. Under Joachim, he served as ispán of Zagreb County from 1270 to 1272. In this capacity, he handled mostly estate matters among the local nobility. Joachim donated the land Pseric to Hodos in September 1270. He held the position until the summer of 1272, when Joachim kidnapped royal heir Ladislaus thereby sparking the era of feudal anarchy.

Despite this lese-majesty, Hodos remained a familiaris of Joachim throughout the 1270s. Following the Babonić family rose up in rebellion in Slavonia in 1277, Joachim gathered a royal army and marched into the southern province, also involving four members of his wide kinship, Hodos and his three nephews, Briccius, George and Benedict. However, the royal troops suffered a disastrous defeat, Joachim Gutkeled was killed in a battle in April 1277, while Hodos lost his left arm and Briccius his finger of his right hand, and both of them were captured by the Styrian knights. The revolt was suppressed only by the arriving auxiliary troops sent by Charles of Sicily in August 1277.

For his losses (Hodos had to redeem himself with a heavy sum), Joachim's brothers – Nicholas, Stephen and Paul – handed over their palace in Zagreb to Hodos. Despite Hodos lost his arm in the fight against the Babonići, he participated in the Battle on the Marchfeld on 26 August 1278. Therefore, Hodos and his nephews were granted Kisbátor in Heves County by Ladislaus IV in 1279. Later, Hodos exchanged his part to a portion in Büdmonostor (part of Tiszavasvári) with his nephews. Alongside Michael Balogsemjén, John Balog, Thomas Káta, and Mike Kaplon, Hodos served as noble judge (Hungarian: szolgabíró; lit. "servants' judge") of Szabolcs and Szatmár counties from 1284 to 1285.

In 1288, Joachim's brothers, Nicholas and Paul asked back the palace in Zagreb from Hodos, to give that to a Croatian nobleman, comes Gilian, as a gift. In the name of his father and cousins, Ladislaus approved this. Hodos was compensated with portions in Palkonya (Borsod County), Bököny, Micske, Újfehértó and Győröcske (Szabolcs County) by Paul in 1291. In the same year, Hodos and his son Ladislaus acquired half of Szakoly via daughters' quarter from George Káta. Thereafter, the village became main residence of his family, which adopted its surname after the settlement.

== Descendants ==
Hodos died sometime after 1291. His son Lawrence entered the service of Charles I of Hungary, one of the pretenders during the interregnum in the early 14th century. The Rakamaz kinship divided the inherited estates among themselves in 1310. Ladislaus and Lawrence received the western portion of Rakamaz. Lawrence was granted the other half of Szakoly for his loyalty from Charles I in 1314. The Szakolyi (Szokoli or Szokoly) family descended from Ladislaus.

== Sources ==
- Karácsonyi, János (1900). A magyar nemzetségek a XIV. század közepéig. [The Hungarian genera until the middle of the 14th century] (in Hungarian). Hungarian Academy of Sciences.
- Kiss-Komjáthy, Andor (2023). ""Qui nec ediem regi, nec regno Ungarie fidelis existit". Gutkeled nembeli Joachim személye és szerepe ["Qui nec ediem regi, nec regno Ungarie fidelis existit". The Person and Role of Joachim Gutkeled]". Fons. 30 (3). Szentpétery Imre Történettudományi Alapítvány: 273–310. ISSN 1217-8020.
- Zsoldos, Attila (2011). Magyarország világi archontológiája, 1000–1301 [Secular Archontology of Hungary, 1000–1301] (in Hungarian). História, MTA Történettudományi Intézete. ISBN 978-963-9627-38-3.

Hodos Genus Gutkeled Born: ? Died: after 1291
Political offices
Preceded by Derek	Ispán of Zagreb; 1270–1272	Succeeded by Peter
