= Joachim Gutkeled =

Hungarian lord

Ban of Slavonia
- Reign: 1270–1272; 1272; 1276–1277
- Predecessor: Henry Kőszegi (1st term); Mojs (2nd term); Thomas Hont-Pázmány (3rd term)
- Successor: Mojs (1st term); Matthew Csák (2nd term); Nicholas Kőszegi (3rd term)
- Died: April 1277; Slavonia, Kingdom of Hungary
- Noble family: gens Gutkeled
- Spouse: Maria Romanovna
- Issue: Clara
- Father: Stephen I

Joachim from the kindred Gutkeled (Hungarian: Gutkeled nembeli Joachim, Croatian: Joakim Pektar; died in April 1277) was an influential Hungarian lord in the second half of the 13th century. As a key figure of the struggles for power between the powerful barons in the 1270s, he kidnapped Ladislaus, the son of and heir to Stephen V of Hungary in June 1272, which was an unprecedented case in Hungarian history during that time and marked the beginning of half a century of turbulent period, called "feudal anarchy". Joachim was one of the first provincial lords, who sought to establish an oligarchic domain independently of the royal power. He was killed in a skirmish against the Babonići.

He was Ban of Slavonia between 1270 and 1272 (with short interruption) and from 1276 to 1277, and three times Master of the treasury between 1272 and 1275. He was also ispán, or head, of many counties, including Baranya and Pozsony.

== Early life ==
Joachim was born around 1240 into the Majád branch of the gens (clan) Gutkeled, a widely extended clan of German origin, which came from the Duchy of Swabia to the Kingdom of Hungary during the reign of Peter in the mid-11th century, according to Simon of Kéza's Gesta Hunnorum et Hungarorum. He was the second son of Stephen I Gutkeled, who was a faithful partisan and powerful baron of Béla IV of Hungary until his death in 1260. Joachim had an elder and two younger brothers. Nicholas II served as Judge royal from 1273 to 1274, then Ban of Slavonia twice. Joachim's younger brothers, Stephen II and Paul were still minors in 1263. They were also elevated into high dignities in the 1270s.

The coat-of-arms of the gens (clan) Gutkeled

His father, Stephen I governed the Duchy of Styria on behalf of claimants Duke Béla and Duke Stephen from 1254 to 1260, his death. It is plausible that the young Joachim did military service and made personal acquaintance with Duke Stephen there, who was the same age as him. After the defeat at Battle of Kressenbrunn in 1260, when Béla was forced to renounce Styria in favor of Ottokar II of Bohemia, tensions emerged in the relationship between Béla IV and his son, Duke Stephen. On the eve of their conflict, which caused a civil war lasting until 1266, Nicholas and Joachim were considered supporters of the monarch. Joachim served as cup-bearer in the ducal court of the child Béla, Duke of Slavonia, King Béla's favored son in 1263. In that year, Nicholas and Joachim donated the estate Szemefölde in Varaždin County to their servants, Ladislaus and Charles from the Básztély clan. According to historians László Zolnay and Jenő Szűcs, the Gutkeled brothers left Béla's allegiance and joined the partisans of Duke Stephen in early 1264, not long before the outbreak of the civil war. As a result, Joachim was granted the lordships of Hátszeg, Miháld and Jeszenő (present-day Hațeg, Mehadia in Romania and Jasenov in Slovakia, respectively), which all laid in the eastern parts of the Kingdom of Hungary, governed by Duke Stephen after the division of the realm in 1262. In contrast, historian Attila Zsoldos doubts his colleagues' theory, considering there is no clear evidence of that, as Joachim had no prominent – if any – role in the subsequent civil war due to his relatively young age, and may have received the large estates later, after Stephen's ascension to the Hungarian throne in 1270. Sometimes before his accession to the Hungarian throne, Duke Stephen donated Pelbárthida (or Vadaszt, today Parhida, Romania) and another unidentified estate to Joachim. In addition, a remark during an exchange of property between Roland Rátót and the Babonići in Slavonia (Deronicha, Boyna and Stoymerich) from August 1266 implies that Joachim indeed joined the partisans of Stephen, while his brother Nicholas remained loyal to Béla IV (that is why the latter did not gain a government role after 1270). During that time, Joachim's lands were mostly located in the eastern part of the kingdom, which may have motivated him to change parties sometime between 1263 and 1266.

Joachim married Ruthenian princess Maria Romanovna in the second half of the 1260s, most plausibly in 1269 or 1270. She was the daughter of Roman Danylovich, Prince of Navahrudak and Gertrude von Babenberg (the general heiress of her family), who were married with King Béla's mediation in 1250, after he met and concluded a peace treaty with Roman's father, Daniel Romanovich, the prince of Galicia. With this marriage, Joachim Gutkeled became a relative of three royal dynasties – the Árpáds, the Babenbergs, which were extinct on the male branch by then, and the Rurikids. The marriage of Joachim and Maria resulted that Gertrude was expelled from Styria by her rival Ottokar II. The couple produced only a daughter, leaving Joachim without male descendants. Their daughter, Clara married Roland Borsa, who served as Voivode of Transylvania in 1282 and from 1284 to 1294. Her daughters' quarter was paid by Paul Gutkeled's sons in 1322. She was still alive in 1337.

== Under Stephen's reign ==
Béla IV died on 3 May 1270. Stephen arrived to Buda within days and nominated his own partisans to the highest offices. On this occasion, Joachim Gutkeled was made Ban of Slavonia, replacing the late Béla's prominent partisan, Henry Kőszegi. His highly prestigious marriage may have contributed to this rapid rise. The coronation of Stephen V caused a brief constitutional crisis in Hungary, some of the senior king's supporters had left the kingdom and gone into exile to Bohemia, where Ottokar placed them under his protection. It seemed that Joachim was a faithful and reliable supporter of the new monarch. He participated in the royal campaign, when Stephen V launched a plundering raid into Austria (Ottokar's realm) around 21 December 1270. He also fought on the king's side in the spring of 1271, when Ottokar invaded the lands north of the Danube and captured a number of fortresses in Upper Hungary. Joachim resided in the royal camp along the lowland river Dudvág (or Dudváh) in mid-June, then at Pressburg (present-day Bratislava in Slovakia) after Stephen's victory over his enemy. He was a signatory of the two king's agreement in Pressburg on 2 July.

Joachim took advantage of his dignity of Ban of Slavonia and his local inherited estates from his father to establish a private territorial domain between the rivers Drava and Sava, in the southwestern part of the kingdom. He acquired or built several castles and their surrounding lordships in the region, for instance Bršljanica (Berstyanóc) and Koprivnica (Kapronca) in Križevci County, and Steničnjak (Sztenicsnyák) in Zagreb County. The fort Koprivnica functioned as the seat of Joachim's domain in Križevci County. His distant relative, Hodos Gutkeled administered Zagreb County on behalf of Joachim. Jenő Szűcs emphasized, the neighboring Somogy and Bács counties were also governed by Joachim's brothers Nicholas and Paul, respectively, in the same period, which expanded Joachim's influence over the region – albeit, Zsoldos does not share this view in his archontology. During his tenure as ban, Joachim began to establish an oligarchic domain – a coherent area of his landholdings – in the territory of Križevci and Zagreb counties (northwestern and eastern parts, respectively) based on his father's acquisitions. In addition, he increased the number of his possessions surrounding the ancient clan estates in Tiszántúl (in Szabolcs, Szatmár, Borsod, Bihar and Zemplén counties). Joachim also established a personal network of his familiares in his Slavonian lordship. In addition to some his relatives from the Gutkeled clan (Hodos, Cosmas), lesser nobles from the region (Bachaler Olaszkai, the Básztélys, Juris de Busan) belonged to his court which he held in his palace in Zagreb.

== Feudal anarchy ==
=== Abduction of the heir apparent ===
Stephen V and his large companion, including his heir, the 10-year-old Ladislaus and the barons of the royal council, routed to Croatia in the late spring of 1272 to meet his ally and the father-in-law of his son, Charles I of Sicily. The royal march stayed in Zagreb on 26 May, then Topusko on 8 June. They had arrived Bihać (Bihács, present-day in Bosnia and Herzegovina) by 23 June. Two days later, Stephen still issued a royal charter, which reflected that everything went according to plan. However, over the next few days, both Joachim Gutkeled and prince Ladislaus had disappeared from the royal camp. Soon, it was revealed that Joachim abducted Ladislaus and held him in captivity in the fortress of Koprivnica in Slavonia. The young prince was guarded by Bachaler Olaszkai, Joachim's familiaris and castellan of Koprivnica. Stephen V immediately gathered an army and besieged the fort, but could not capture it, because the surrounding lands belonged to the heartland of Joachim's growing domain. Stephen returned to Hungary by mid-July in order to recruit a larger army to liberate his son. He dismissed Joachim Gutkeled as Ban of Slavonia and replaced him with his faithful partisan, Mojs. Simultaneously, Joachim's brothers had also become disgraced in the royal council. However, Stephen fell seriously ill by then, probably exacerbated by the humiliation and mental collapse triggered by Joachim's treason. The king was taken to the Csepel Island, where he died on 6 August 1272.

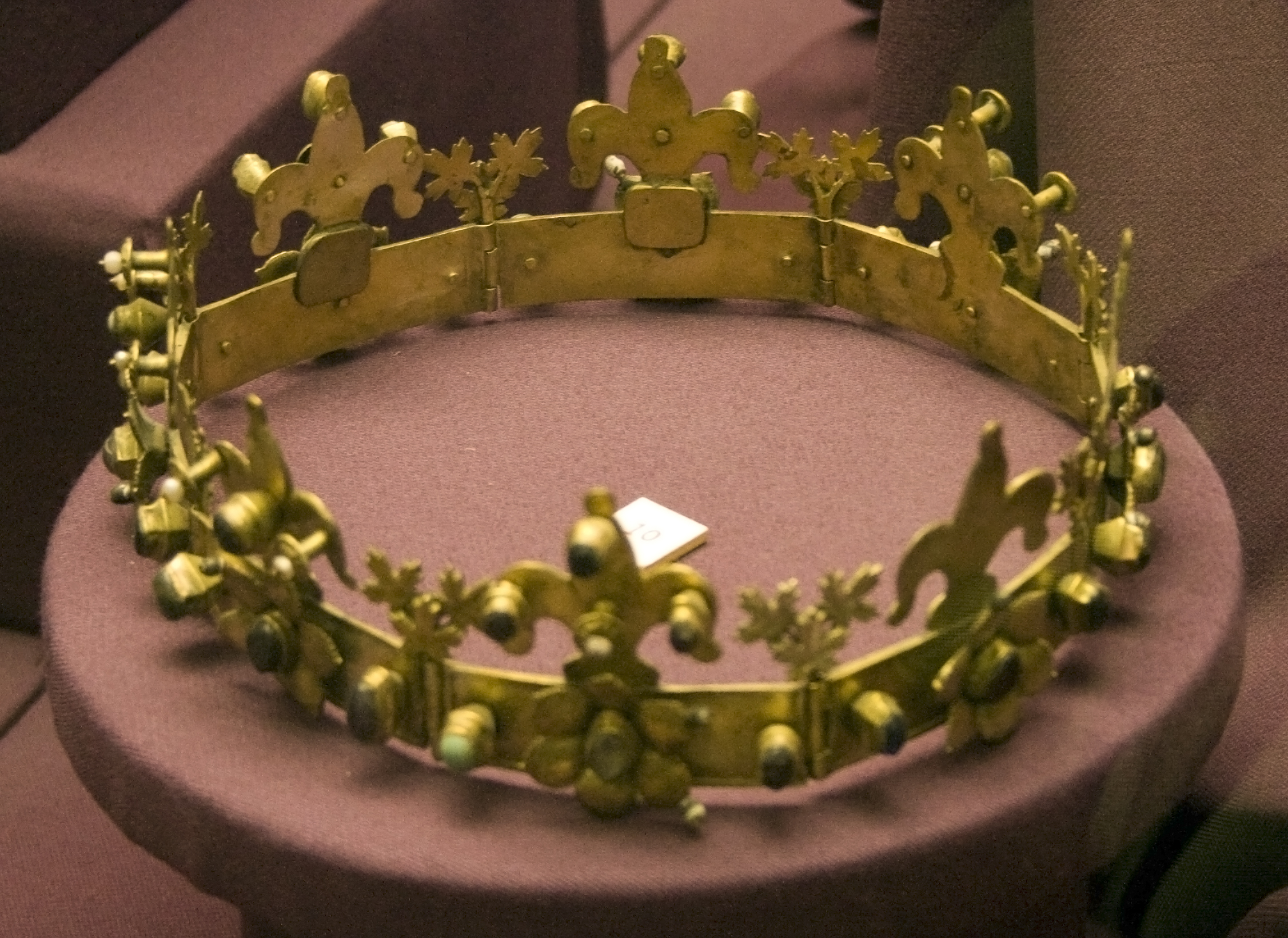
Stephen V's funeral crown

Due to lack of resources and inconsistency of partial information, Joachim's motivation and political goals remained unclear. Historian Tamás Kádár considers personal reasons, perhaps Joachim was afraid of marginalization or was dissatisfied with the office he held. Historian Pál Engel suggests that Joachim Gutkeled planned to force Stephen V to divide Hungary with Ladislaus. Zsoldos argues Joachim played an active role in a widespread conspiracy. Since the late 19th century, several historians considered – including Bálint Hóman and Gyula Kristó – that Ladislaus was abducted and imprisoned with the knowledge and consent of his mother, Queen Elizabeth the Cuman, who wanted to increase real government power alongside her husband, King Stephen V. In this relationship, Joachim was a favourite of Queen Elizabeth. Their goal was to divide the royal power through the affected Ladislaus, and ultimately to exert their influence in the royal council. 20th-century works of fiction hypothesized an adulterous relationship between Queen Elizabeth and Joachim, but no contemporary or later source has stated this. Jenő Szűcs argues that Joachim related to three royal dynasties through his marriage, thus he considered himself a personality, who rightly dictates in the upper sphere of politics.

Joachim's plot put an end to a political era in medieval Hungary, which was still governed by "the instrument of truth and successful results" until the reign of Stephen V. The abduction of Ladislaus, an unprecedented case in Hungarian history prior to that, and the subsequent events marked the beginning of a new half a century period, called "feudal anarchy", which lasted until 1323, and characterized by the weakening of royal power, anarchic conditions in the governance and civil wars and feuds between various rivaling baronial groups, who struggled for supreme power. The feudal anarchy also led to the emergence of so-called "oligarchs", who established independent territorial provinces in various parts of the kingdom, administering their domains independently of the king. Joachim Gutkeled was one of their first representatives. Jurist Balázs László called the abduction as an "act of terrorism". According to historian Gyula Kristó, Joachim had introduced "political brigandage" in Hungary with his act.

=== Struggle for power ===
Joachim Gutkeled departed for Székesfehérvár as soon as he was informed of Stephen V's death, because he wanted to arrange Ladislaus' coronation. Stephen's widow, Queen Elizabeth joined him, infuriating the deceased monarch's partisans who accused her of having conspired against her husband. One of them, Egidius Monoszló immediately laid siege in late August to the Dowager Queen's palace in Székesfehérvár to "rescue" Ladislaus from the rival baronial group's influence. Another foreign chronicles claimed the Monoszlós wanted to assert Duke Béla of Macsó's claim to the Hungarian throne. However Egidius' military action ended in failure as Joachim's troops routed his army after some clashes and bloodshed. Egidius and his kinship fled Hungary to the court of Ottokar II who provided shelter to them. Ladislaus IV was crowned king in early September 1272. In theory, the 10-year-old Ladislaus ruled under his mother's regency, but in fact, baronial parties administered the kingdom. The most important and powerful lord was Joachim Gutkeled during that months, who became guardian and tutor of the young king. His position of Ban of Slavonia was also restored already in late August. Joachim dominated Hungarian politics for the upcoming years with more or less efficiency. In his letter to his wife's maternal cousin, Elizabeth in 1275, Ottokar II called Joachim Gutkeled as "his most dangerous foe in Hungary". Otherwise, this letter narrates the story of the abduction of Ladislaus in the most detailed way.

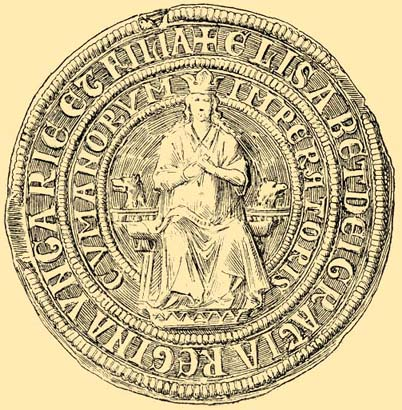
The seal of Queen Elizabeth the Cuman, Joachim Gutkeled's brief political ally

Simultaneously with the Monoszlós' departure, Henry Kőszegi arrived to Hungary from his exile at Prague. In November 1272, he brutally assassinated Béla of Macsó, who, as he was the only capable male adult member of the Árpád dynasty, was in the path of every aspirant baronial groups, who fought for supreme power. It is plausible that Joachim also played a role in planning the assassination, as he heavily rejected Béla's pro-Bohemian orientation because of political and family reasons, and Henry Kőszegi avoided prosecution due to Joachim' intervention. Immediately after the assassination, Joachim Gutkeled made an alliance with Henry Kőszegi and the Geregye brothers, forming one of the two main baronial groups, while the other one was dominated by the Csák and Monoszló clans. According to Tamás Kádár, the alliance of Joachim and Henry was a "political coalition of two common criminals". Andor Kiss-Komjáthy described their relationship as a "political symbiosis of equal parties". While Joachim exerted his influence over the royal court in the heart of the realm, his ally Henry built up the hinterland on the outskirts of the kingdom and also defended Joachim's territory. Joachim elevated into the dignity of Master of the treasury in November 1272, thus supervised the country's finances. Beside that, he also became ispán of Pilis County. The latter position, as Pilis was a queenly estate, also confirms the strong relationship of trust between Elizabeth and Joachim, in addition to the fact it laid in the medium regni, the centre part of the kingdom. Initially, Henry and Joachim were affiliated with Queen Elizabeth against the late Stephen's supporters (especially the Csáks), but, soon, Joachim Gutkeled betrayed his patron and they expelled the queen mother and her courtiers from power and her regency remained only nominal during the whole minority of Ladislaus IV. Joachim's growing influence over the royal council were reflected by three royal charters, which were issued in the name of the young monarch throughout in the period from 1272 to 1274. The first document (November 1272), a royal donation to castellan Bachaler, does not identify Joachim's name as a kidnapper and describes that Ladislaus was abdicated "because of the resentment of some of his [Stephen's] barons". The second document, issued in late 1273, interprets that Ladislaus was forced to retreat to Koprivnica because of "his enemies' deceits", and states in a falsified manner that the 10-year-old child voluntarily sought refuge in the castle. Interestingly, the beneficiary Job Csicseri participated in the failed siege of Koprivnica, further increasing the degree of contradiction. The third document, issued on 25 September 1274, i.e. days before the Battle of Föveny, Ladislaus donated privilege to Sebastian, ispán of Torna County, who "served faithfully [...] in the castle of Koprivnica, where we retreated before [the wrath of] our dearest father".

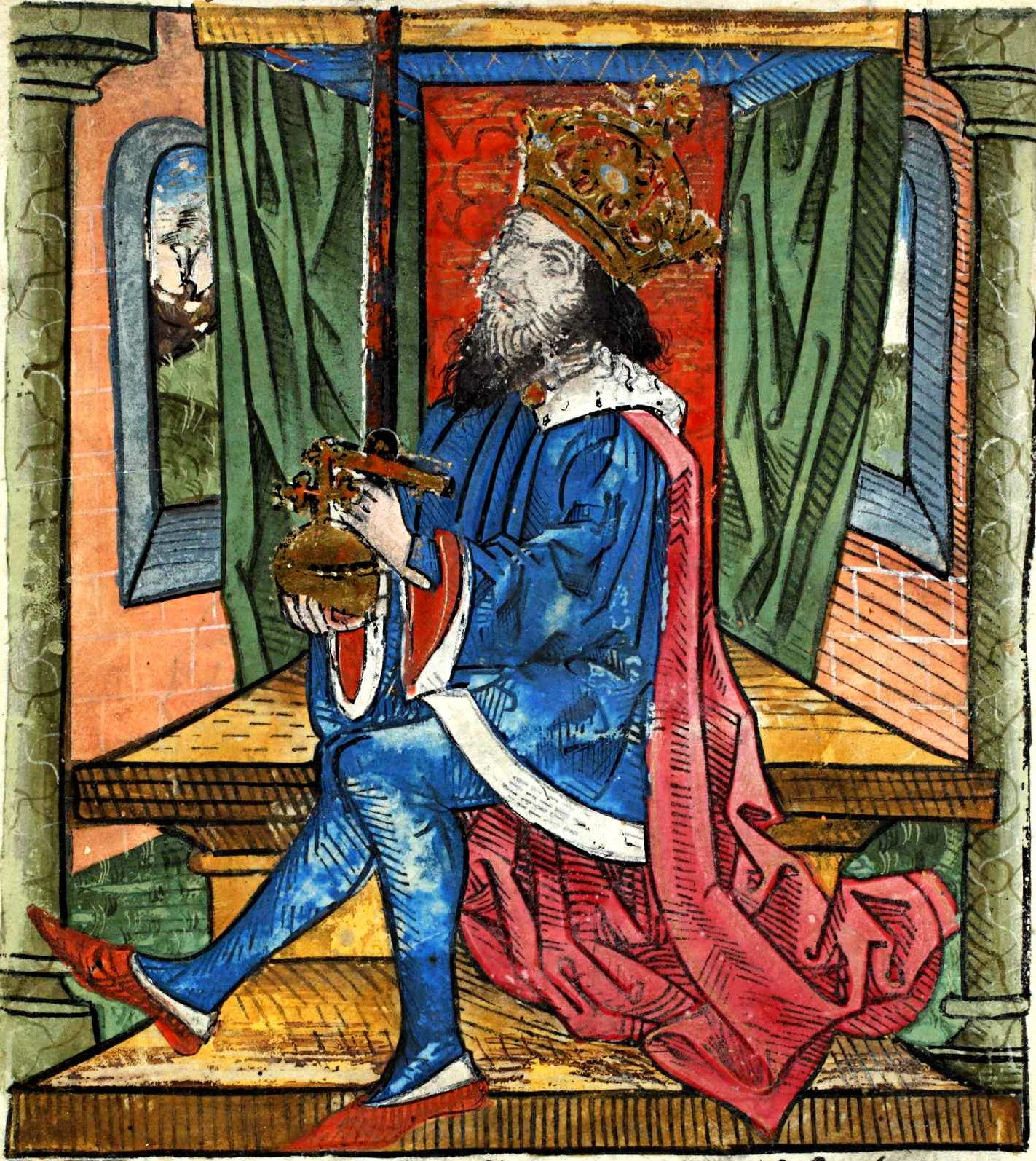
Ladislaus IV, as depicted in 15th-century Chronica Hungarorum

Joachim participated in private initiative Hungarian incursions into Austria and Moravia in February 1273, along with Denis Péc, Matthew Csák, Ivan Kőszegi, and his distant relative Amadeus Gutkeled. They marched into Fürstenfeld and besieged it, plundering and destroying the surrounding lands. In retaliation for the raids, Ottokar's troops invaded the borderlands of Hungary in April 1273. The Bohemian army captured Győr and Szombathely, plundering the western counties. Taking advantage of the situation, Queen Elizabeth attempted to recover her former influence and expelled Joachim Gutkeled and Nicholas Geregye from the government. Joachim was replaced as Master of the treasury by the queen's partisan Stephen Rátót around May 1373. However, the barons of the realm have temporarily made peace and installed a "national unity government" around June to successfully suppress the enemy. The queen's efforts failed and Joachim Gutkeled was re-installed as Master of the treasury. Beside his restored position of ispán of Pilis County, he also became head of Pozsony County. Joachim Gutkeled led a united army of powerful barons against Ottokar, which besieged Győr. He recaptured the two aforementioned forts – Győr and Szombathely – two months later, while Denis Péc fought with a Bohemian rearguard near Győr in August. Henry Kőszegi defeated the Bohemian army at Laa in August. In a second wave, Ottokar's army recaptured Győr and seized many fortresses, including Sopron in the autumn. The cooperation of baronial parties lasted only a few months. Joachim participated in the successful attack at Nagyszombat (today Trnava, Slovakia), where the town was recovered. Alongside Denis Péc and Egidius Monoszló, who returned to Hungary from exile, Joachim Gutkeled defeated a Moravian army at the walls of Detrekő Castle (today ruins near Plavecké Podhradie, Slovakia) in October, which fort was unsuccessfully besieged by Ottokar's troops. Nevertheless, large-scale territories and counties remained under the suzerainty of Ottokar and the war had been brought to an end without truce of peace treaty. Around October 1273, the Kőszegi–Gutkeled–Geregye baronial group took control over the country, ousting the Csák kindred. Abolishing the balance of power between the two rivaling groups, Henry Kőszegi and Joachim Gutkeled expelled several members of the royal council and established a homogeneous "party government" in late 1273, as Szűcs called in his monograph. For instance, the brothers of Joachim also elevated into high positions.

Matthew Csák and his allies removed Voivode Nicholas Geregye from power in early June 1274, but Henry Kőszegi and the Gutkeled brothers were able to retain their positions, although their homogeneous government was terminated. Fearing the rival group's gradual advancement in the previous weeks, Joachim Gutkeled and Henry Kőszegi captured Ladislaus IV and his mother near Buda at the end of June 1274. They restored the homogeneous government thereafter, while the young monarch and Queen Elizabeth were practically held under house arrest. Although the illustrious military general Peter Csák liberated the king and his mother in a short time, the two powerful lords, Henry Kőszegi and Joachim Gutkeled captured Ladislaus' younger brother, Andrew, and took him to Slavonia, the centre of their political basis. They demanded Slavonia in Duke Andrew's name and intended to utilize the young prince as "anti-king" against his elder brother, who came under the influence of the Csáks by then. During their journey to the southern province, the royal army led by Peter Csák and Lawrence Aba chased and caught them still in Transdanubia. The pro-Ladislaus troops defeated their united forces in the Battle of Föveny (or Bökénysomló), near present-day Polgárdi in the days between 26 and 29 September 1274. Henry Kőszegi was killed in the skirmish, while Joachim Gutkeled managed to survive. Henry's sons, Nicholas and Ivan also fled the battlefield, withdrawing their troops to the borderlands between Hungary and Austria. Thereafter Peter Csák tried to defeat them ultimately, but the royal campaign has not achieved success. After the Battle of Föveny, the Csák baronial group took supreme power and Joachim Gutkeled lost his dignities and political influence. He retreated to his province beyond the Drava. He was able to retain only the ispánate of Pilis County. The king also confiscated some of his lands outside Slavonia, including Málca in Zemplén County (present-day Malčice, Slovakia), which was given to Lawrence Aba.

=== Last years ===
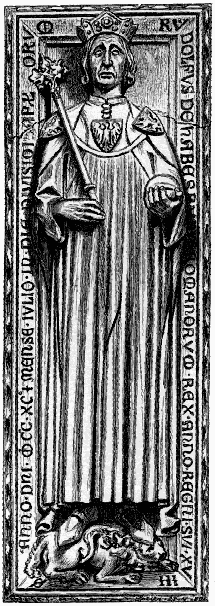
The epitaph of Rudolf I of Germany

Despite their violent actions against the monarch, the Kőszegis and the Gutkeleds regained their influence and retook the power by the spring of 1275. Joachim Gutkeled continued to cooperate with the sons of his late political ally, Henry Kőszegi. During the new course, Joachim became Master of the treasury again in June 1275, replacing Egidius Monoszló. Beside that, he also served as ispán of Baranya County and Bánya (Árkibánya) ispánate within Nyitra County. According to Ottokar's aforementioned letter from the same year, the young Ladislaus "dared not to do anything different from what he [Joachim] thought was good". A new civil war broke out between Joachim Gutkeled and Peter Csák in the following months; Ugrin Csák took the first step in the emerging conflict, when attacked Joachim's troops near Föveny, where the aforementioned battle took place one year earlier. However, Ugrin failed and the following royal charter issued by the Kőszegi-dominated royal council in the name of Ladislaus IV called him "treasonous". Joachim lost his positions in the autumn of 1275, when the Csáks retook their influence over the royal council. Thereafter Peter Csák launched a massive military campaign against the Kőszegi dominion, his army plundered and devastated the territory of the Diocese of Veszprém which headed by Bishop Peter Kőszegi. Meanwhile, the Geregyes looted the Csák landholdings in Fejér County. The barbarian attack against the Diocese of Veszprém discredited Peter Csák. Joachim Gutkeled and the Kőszegis again removed their opponents from power at an assembly of the barons and noblemen at Buda around 21 June 1276. Joachim was appointed Ban of Slavonia shortly thereafter.

From the middle of 1275, Joachim Gutkeled has significantly influenced Hungary's foreign policy orientation. Rudolf of Habsburg was elected King of Germany in September 1273. His rival, Ottokar II, himself also a candidate for the throne, was almost alone in opposing Rudolf. He did not recognize Rudolf as king, thus the Imperial Diet at Nuremberg decided to deprive Ottokar from his Crown estates, the duchies of Austria, Styria and Carinthia in November 1274. Ottokar was in a tight position and sent a peace offer to the Hungarian royal court to avoid a two-front war in October 1275. The Csák group was willing to accept the offer, but they had lost their positions in the royal council before do that. The Kőszegis and Joachim Gutkeled rejected the pro-Ottokar orientation. Around mid-1275, Joachim sent a letter to Rudolf, from whom he sought assistance and intervention in asserting his supposed rights in Styria. Through his wife, also a Babenberg heiress, Joachim laid claim to get a share in the provinces, which were seized by the Bohemian king. In his reply, Rudolf expressed his support and satisfaction with Joachim's loyalty, who claimed for himself the territories (Judenburg and its surroundings) that his mother-in-law Gertrude once owned before her expulsion from the duchy. Rudolf assured Joachim's envoy, a certain friar "B." that he would support Joachim's claim to the Duchy of Styria. In late summer 1275, however, the German king informed Ladislaus IV that he could do nothing for Joachim's case, because others also formed a right to Styria. With the efficacious mediation of Joachim, Ladislaus IV and Rudolf I concluded an alliance against Ottokar II of Bohemia. Although Joachim agreed to the meeting proposed by Ottokar, but deliberately set impossible conditions (e.g. armed escort) to make it impossible. Ottokar sent a letter to one of the daughters of Stephen V (Catherine or Elizabeth) to convince her brother Ladislaus to form an alliance with him. In his letter, the Bohemian king listed all of Joachim's sins, accusing that the peace treaty of 1271 also failed because of Joachim, who at the time had the king completely under his control. According to Ottokar's value judgment, "Joachim, who is loyal neither to the king nor to the kingdom of Hungary" ("Ioachim, qui nec eidem regi, nec regno Ungarie fidelis existit"), however, this can also be attributed to Ottokar's personal antipathy. When Rudolf declared war against Ottokar in June 1276 and his army marched into Austria in the autumn, the Kőszegi–Gutkeled baronial group dominated the Hungarian governance and decided to support the King of Germany. Taking advantage of the war between Rudolf I and Ottokar II, the 14-year-old Ladislaus IV and Joachim Gutkeled made an incursion into Austria in November. The town of Sopron soon accepted Ladislaus's suzerainty and Ottokar II promised to renounce of all towns he occupied in western Hungary.

New armed conflicts began in Hungary during 1277. One of these revolts directly threatened Joachim Gutkeled's territorial domain in Slavonia. The powerful Babonić family ruled areas of considerable size in the region between the rivers Kulpa (Kupa) and Una. Their rise began at the turn of the 12th and 13th centuries when they received enormous estates from the Kings of Hungary. Their expansion had reached the border of Joachim's province by the 1270s. The ambitious brothers, Stephen and Radoslav Babonić rose up in rebellion in Slavonia and hired Styrian robber knights and mercenaries to plunder and destroy the province of Slavonia, including Joachim's lands. In order to suppress the revolt, the Ban gathered a royal army and marched into southern Slavonia, also involving four members of his wide kinship, including Hodos and Briccius, the forefather of the Báthory family. However, the royal troops suffered a disastrous defeat, Joachim Gutkeled was killed in a battle in April 1277, while Hodos lost his left arm and Briccius his finger of his right hand, and both of them were captured by the Styrian knights. The revolt was suppressed only by the arriving auxiliary troops sent by Charles of Sicily in August 1277. As historian Jenő Szűcs noted, "The paradox of history is that [Joachim], this boldly ambitious leader of the new political era, the first magnate to openly declare war to the royal power, [...] has at least formally fallen under the protection of the state".

== Legacy ==
The evolving pro-Habsburg political orientation, the 1277 provincial rebellions (Szepesség, Transylvania and Slavonia) and Joachim Gutkeled's death marked the end of the first phase (1272–1277) of the reign of Ladislaus IV. A month after Joachim's death, the general assembly declared Ladislaus to be of age, who was also authorized to restore internal peace with all possible means. Joachim died without male descendants. His brothers, Nicholas and Stephen were not ambitious enough to keep end establish a territorial domain in Slavonia. The Kőszegis and the Babonići divided the Gutkeled's province between each other on the border of Transdanubia and Slavonia. In their agreement at Dubica on 20 April 1278, the Kőszegis and the Babonići divided the spheres of interest in Slavonia between each other. The Kőszegi brothers renounced territorial claims from all areas south of the river Sava (Slavonia inferior, "Lower Slavonia") in favor of Stephen Babonić and his clan, who acknowledged the Kőszegis' power north of the river at the same time. Soon, the youngest Kőszegi brother, Henry Jr. expanded his influence over a significant portion of that territory, which was ruled by Joachim Gutkeled prior to that. After the Kőszegis' betrayal, Ladislaus IV contacted with Joachim's brothers, who swore loyalty to the king at Csanád (present-day Cenad, Romania) on 19 June 1278. Nicholas and Stephen Gutkeled also reconciled with their rivals, the Babonići in Zagreb in November 1278, with the mediation of some powerful lords.

Pursuing Joachim's foreign policy orientation, Ladislaus' troops played a decisive role in Rudolf's victory in the Battle on the Marchfeld on 26 August 1278, where Ottokar II was killed, which led to the rise of the House of Habsburg, a long-term effect to the history of Central Europe.

== Sources ==
- Engel, Pál (1996). Magyarország világi archontológiája, 1301–1457, I [Secular Archontology of Hungary, 1301–1457, Volume I] (in Hungarian). História, MTA Történettudományi Intézete. ISBN 963-8312-44-0.
- Engel, Pál (2001). The Realm of St Stephen: A History of Medieval Hungary, 895–1526. I.B. Tauris Publishers. ISBN 1-86064-061-3.
- Kádár, Tamás (2013). "Történeti valóság és manipulált, illetve meghamisított politikai emlékezet Magyarországon IV. László király uralkodása első éveiben [Historical Reality and Manipulated and Forged Political Memory in Hungary During the First Regnal Years of King Ladislaus IV]". Fons (in Hungarian). 20 (4). Szentpétery Imre Történettudományi Alapítvány: 525–540. ISSN 1217-8020.
- Kádár, Tamás (2020). "Az 1272. évi székesfehérvári "palotaforradalom" [The "Palace Revolution" of 1272 in Székesfehérvár]". Aetas (in Hungarian). 35 (2). AETAS Könyv- és Lapkiadó Egyesület: 49–65. ISSN 0237-7934.
- Kiss-Komjáthy, Andor (2023). ""Qui nec ediem regi, nec regno Ungarie fidelis existit". Gutkeled nembeli Joachim személye és szerepe ["Qui nec ediem regi, nec regno Ungarie fidelis existit". The Person and Role of Joachim Gutkeled]". Fons. 30 (3). Szentpétery Imre Történettudományi Alapítvány: 273–310. ISSN 1217-8020.
- László, Balázs (2015). "Gutkeled nembeli Joachim hűtlensége [The Disloyalty of Joachim from the Kindred Gutkeled]". Joghistória (in Hungarian). 19 (2). ELTE Állam- és Jogtudományi Kar Magyar Állam- és Jogtörténeti Tanszék: 31–37. ISSN 2062-9699.
- Markó, László (2006). A magyar állam főméltóságai Szent Istvántól napjainkig: Életrajzi Lexikon [Great Officers of State in Hungary from King Saint Stephen to Our Days: A Biographical Encyclopedia] (in Hungarian). Helikon Kiadó. ISBN 963-547-085-1.
- Rudolf, Veronika (2023). Közép-Európa a hosszú 13. században [Central Europe in the Long 13th Century] (in Hungarian). Arpadiana XV., Research Centre for the Humanities. ISBN 978-963-416-406-7.
- Szűcs, Jenő (2002). Az utolsó Árpádok [The Last Árpáds] (in Hungarian). Osiris Kiadó. ISBN 963-389-271-6.
- Zsoldos, Attila (2003). "Az özvegy és a szolgabírák [The Widow and the Noble Judges]". Századok (in Hungarian). 137 (4). Magyar Történelmi Társulat: 783–808. ISSN 0039-8098.
- Zsoldos, Attila (2007). Családi ügy: IV. Béla és István ifjabb király viszálya az 1260-as években [A family affair: The Conflict between Béla IV and Junior King Stephen in the 1260s] (in Hungarian). História, MTA Történettudományi Intézete. ISBN 978-963-9627-15-4.
- Zsoldos, Attila (2011). Magyarország világi archontológiája, 1000–1301 [Secular Archontology of Hungary, 1000–1301] (in Hungarian). História, MTA Történettudományi Intézete. ISBN 978-963-9627-38-3.

Joachim Genus Gutkeled Born: c. 1240 Died: April 1277
Political offices
Preceded by Henry Kőszegi	Ban of Slavonia; 1270–1272	Succeeded by Mojs
Preceded by Mojs	Ban of Slavonia; 1272	Succeeded by Matthew Csák
Preceded by Ernye Ákos	Master of the treasury 1272–1273	Succeeded by Stephen Rátót
Preceded by Stephen Rátót	Master of the treasury 1273–1274	Succeeded by Egidius Monoszló
Preceded by Egidius Monoszló	Master of the treasury 1275	Succeeded by Matthew Csák
Preceded by Thomas Hont-Pázmány	Ban of Slavonia; 1276–1277	Succeeded by Nicholas Kőszegi
