= Zágráb =

Zágráb may refer to:

- the Hungarian name for the city of Zagreb, Croatia
- Zagreb County (former), an administrative subdivision of the former Kingdom of Hungary
