= Job Csicseri =

Hungarian nobleman and soldier

Rector of the Royal Chefs
- Reign: 1273
- Died: 1308/10
- Noble family: House of Csicseri
- Issue: Dominic; Michael (Mokó); Nicholas a daughter
- Father: Simon Csicseri

Job Csicseri (also known as Job the Small; Hungarian: Csicseri "Kis" Jób; died 1309/10) was a Hungarian nobleman and soldier at the turn of the 13th and 14th centuries. Job was part of the army of Stephen V of Hungary that unsuccessfully besieged the rebellious lord Joachim Gutkeled at Koprivnica in 1272. Stephen died shortly afterwards and Job was appointed by his successor, the child Ladislaus IV, as rector of the royal chefs. Job fought for Ladislaus in the unsuccessful campaign against the Kőszegi family in 1283-84 and was rewarded with grants of land, including Ung County where he moved his residence. Around 1290 Job became familiaris to the powerful lord Amadeus Aba. Job fought for Andrew III of Hungary against Austria in 1291. In 1308 he became ispán of Bereg County.

== Family ==
His father was Simon Csicseri, who, together with his relatives, possessed land portions in Berkesz in Szabolcs County. According to a non-authentic charter, dated 27 October 1239, Job's grandfather was John Belye of Berkesz. Job was called with the nickname "Small" (Latin: parvus) and also with the title of magister by a contemporary document in 1284. He had three sons – Dominic, Michael (also called Moko or Mokó) and Nicholas. They were prominent landowners and administrative officials in Ung County by the early 14th century.

Through his sons, Job was the ancestor of the Csicseri (Csicsery), the Ormos de Csicser and the Orosz de Csicser noble families. All three families still flourished in the 19th century and they were named after their ancient common land, Csicser (present-day Čičarovce, Slovakia), which Job had obtained in the late 13th century (thus later royal charters and documents anachronistically call Simon with the surname Csicseri). Job also had an unidentified daughter, who married a certain Lucas.

== Career ==
According to the royal charter of Ladislaus IV, issued in the last days of 1273, Job faithfully and commendably served his predecessors, Béla IV and Stephen V. When a rebellious lord, Joachim Gutkeled abducted and imprisoned the then 10-year-old presumptive heir Ladislaus to his fort, Koprivnica (Kapronca) in the summer of 1272, Stephen V immediately gathered an army and besieged the fort, but could not capture it. According to the aforementioned charter, Job was one of the besiegers of the castle. Interestingly, the document reflects the domination of Joachim Gutkeled over the royal council in that time (end of 1273 or early 1274), as it interprets that Ladislaus was forced to retreat to Koprivnica because of "his enemies' deceits", and states in a falsified manner that the 10-year-old child voluntarily sought refuge in the castle. During the war with the Kingdom of Bohemia, he fought at Győr in the summer of 1273. For his military service and loyalty, Job was granted the village of Radácsfalva in Sáros County in August 1273.

In that year, he was referred to as rector of the royal chefs; he is the only known office-holder, who bore that courtly title or dignity. Historian Péter Kis considered its same function with the ispáns (or heads) of the various royal servants. In this position, Job was superior of the royal chefs and the additional large staff of the courtyard kitchen, and perhaps the business affairs of its operation also belonged to his function.

Job participated in the failed 1283–84 royal campaign against the powerful Kőszegi family. One of his unidentified relatives was killed during the war. Job obtained the royal donation of Komlós in Abaúj County for his participation from Ladislaus IV in July 1284. He was also granted two lands in Ung County, Csicser and Sislóc (present-day Sislivci in Ukraine) by King Ladislaus in the 1280s; initially both villages belonged to the property of a certain castle warrior, Szoboszló (Soběslav), whose bloodline became extinct sometime before 1279, and, thus, the lands were reverted to the Crown. Job (now, called Csicseri) gradually transferred his political, social and economical interests to Ung County, which became the permanent residence of his family and the basis of its wealth. Job also bought the half part of Vaján (present-day Vojany, Slovakia) from castle warriors in 1292.

Around 1290, Job joined the allegiance of the powerful lord Amadeus Aba, becoming his familiaris. By that time, Amadeus ruled de facto independently the northern and north-eastern counties of the Kingdom of Hungary, including Ung and Bereg counties, where Job's lands mostly laid. Amadeus Aba's political orientation also determined Job's affiliation and relationship to the monarchs. Ladislaus' successor, Andrew III of Hungary enjoyed the support of Amadeus Aba during his reign. Job fought in the royal military campaign against the Duchy of Austria in the summer of 1291. Therefore, Andrew III confirmed the former land donation of Komlós for Job in July 1291. Job petitioned his complaint to the court of Charles I in 1304, that Alexander Karászi unlawfully seized and possessed his bequeathed estate Berkesz since 1288. At the end of his life, Job became vice-ispán of Bereg County with the title of ispán in 1308. The county was also administered by the gens (clan) Aba. Job Csicseri died soon, in 1309 or 1310. His sons already appeared individually during an act of domination in early 1311. They remained supporters of the Aba clan even after the assassination of Amadeus Aba in September 1311, and they had fought in the Battle of Rozgony against the royal army of Charles I in June 1312. After the defeat, Michael (Mokó) and Dominic swore loyalty to the Hungarian monarch and were elevated into administrative offices in Ung County, contributing to the survival of the Csicseri family and its future cadet branches.

== Sources ==
- Engel, Pál (1996). Magyarország világi archontológiája, 1301–1457, I [Secular Archontology of Hungary, 1301–1457, Volume I] (in Hungarian). História, MTA Történettudományi Intézete. ISBN 963-8312-44-0.
- Engel, Pál (1998). A nemesi társadalom a középkori Ung megyében [The Noble Society in Medieval Ung County] (in Hungarian). Társadalom- és művelődéstörténeti tanulmányok 25., MTA Történettudományi Intézete. ISBN 963-8312-59-9.
- Kádár, Tamás (2013). "Történeti valóság és manipulált, illetve meghamisított politikai emlékezet Magyarországon IV. László király uralkodása első éveiben [Historical Reality and Manipulated and Forged Political Memory in Hungary During the First Regnal Years of King Ladislaus IV]". Fons. 20 (4). Szentpétery Imre Történettudományi Alapítvány: 525–540. ISSN 1217-8020.
- Kis, Péter (2010). A királyi szolgálónépi szervezet a 13–14. században [The Organization of Royal Servants in the 13–14th Centuries]. Szeged: Szegedi Középkortörténeti Könyvtár. ISBN 978-963-306-080-3.
- Zsoldos, Attila (1997). "Kassa túszai (Pillanatfelvétel 1311-ből Aba Amadé famíliájáról) [The Hostages of Kassa (A Snapshot of Amadeus Aba's Family from 1311)]". Történelmi Szemle (in Hungarian). 39 (3–4). Hungarian Academy of Sciences: 345–362. ISSN 0040-9634.
- Zsoldos, Attila (2011). Magyarország világi archontológiája, 1000–1301 [Secular Archontology of Hungary, 1000–1301] (in Hungarian). História, MTA Történettudományi Intézete. ISBN 978-963-9627-38-3.
