= Bachaler Olaszkai =

Castellan of Koprivnica
- Reign: 1272
- Died: around 1300
- Noble family: House of Olaszkai
- Father: Vida Olaszkai

Bachaler Olaszkai (Hungarian: Olaszkai Bachaler; died around 1300) was a Hungarian medieval soldier and lesser noble in the second half of the 13th century. He served as castellan of Koprivnica (Kapronca) in 1272, when King Stephen V's son and heir, Ladislaus was abducted and imprisoned there.

== Military service ==
Bachaler was born into a lesser noble family of possible castle warrior origin, which possessed some landholdings in Vas County. His father was a certain Vida, who owned the estate of Olaszka (present-day belongs to Olaszfa). He had two brothers, Lawrence and Kemény. Bachaler joined the royal army in the summer of 1253, when Béla IV of Hungary launched a campaign against the Margraviate of Moravia, ruled by his long-standing enemy, Ottokar. During the campaign, Bachaler fought at the walls of the castle Pirill, where one of his relatives was perished. For his service and bravery, Bachaler was granted the estate of Szarakad by Béla IV in 1255, two years later. Prior to that, the land belonged to the ispánate of Vasvár and laid near his family's centre, Olaszka. With his brothers and other relatives, Bachaler divided their inherited and jointly owned land, Olaszka on 26 September 1258. He received a relatively insignificant portion.

He disappears from contemporary sources in the 1260s. It is presumable that he entered the service of the increasingly influential baron, Joachim Gutkeled, during that time. Becoming Joachim's familiaris, Bachaler elevated into the position of castellan of Koprivnica, a stronghold in Slavonia by the summer of 1272. His lord, Joachim Gutkeled abducted the 10-year-old heir presumptive Ladislaus from the royal camp, which stayed in Slavonia, and held him in captivity in the fortress of Koprivnica in late June. Joachim entrusted his castellan Bachaler to guard the young prince, who was technically held under house arrest. As Ladislaus' jailer, Bachaler remained faithful to Joachim's case, even when Stephen V gathered an army and besieged Koprivnica. Bachaler and his garrison successfully defended the fort. The Hungarian king retreated to inner Hungary and died soon in early August 1272. Joachim Gutkeled departed for Székesfehérvár as soon as he was informed of Stephen V's death, because he wanted to arrange Ladislaus' ascension to the Hungarian throne. Ladislaus IV was crowned king in early September 1272. One of the first measures of the royal council, dominated by Joachim and his allies, was the confirmation and transliteration of Béla's former land donations to Bachaler in November 1272. The royal charter was issued in the name of the young monarch, accordingly, Bachaler has done countless ministry, shedding his blood and "exposing himself to the precarious whims of destiny", when "We were detained [...] due to the resentment of some of Hungary's barons".

Alongside his brother, Kemény, Bachaler participated in the war against the Kingdom of Bohemia in 1273. They belonged to Joachim Gutkeled's banderium, when their lord, along with other barons, launched private initiative Hungarian incursions into Austria and Moravia in February. Both Bachaler and Kemény were wounded during the military action. Thereafter, they were transferred to the army of Ivan Kőszegi, ispán of Zala County, by April, where fought to recapture Győr from Ottokar's mercenaries. They also participated in the battle at Laa in August. They remained in the service of the Kőszegi army, and fought in the victorious battle at Marchegg. Bachaler seriously injured there. When a certain Moravian knight, Stephanych of Holun and his mercenaries stormed the borderlands in Vas County, Bachaler and Kemény clashed with them and captured some of important generals. For their service, Nicholas Kőszegi donated a portion of his land, Konsa in Križevci County to the brothers. Ladislaus IV confirmed the donation in a privilege letter on 21 July 1275.

== Later life ==
Sometime before 1280, Bachaler unlawfully seized the estate of Lapatk. In May 1280, Ladislaus IV ordered Stephen Gutkeled, Ban of Slavonia to recover the land for its rightful owners and defend their interests. Bachaler is next mentioned by sources in January 1291, when Andrew III of Hungary confirmed and transcribed Béla's letter of donation (1255). Bachaler resided permanently in Križevci County by that time. He compiled his last will and testament around 1300, at the Franciscan monastery of Gorbonok (present-day Kloštar Podravski in Croatia). He owned portions of eight lands and estates in Vas and Križevci counties at the time of his death.

== Sources ==
- Kádár, Tamás (2013). "Történeti valóság és manipulált, illetve meghamisított politikai emlékezet Magyarországon IV. László király uralkodása első éveiben [Historical Reality and Manipulated and Forged Political Memory in Hungary During the First Regnal Years of King Ladislaus IV]". Fons. 20 (4). Szentpétery Imre Történettudományi Alapítvány: 525–540. ISSN 1217-8020.
- Szűcs, Jenő (2002). Az utolsó Árpádok [The Last Árpáds] (in Hungarian). Osiris Kiadó. ISBN 963-389-271-6.
- Zsoldos, Attila (2011). Magyarország világi archontológiája, 1000–1301 [Secular Archontology of Hungary, 1000–1301] (in Hungarian). História, MTA Történettudományi Intézete. ISBN 978-963-9627-38-3.
