= Briccius Báthory =

Hungarian nobleman (died 1322)

A simplified version of the Báthori coat of arms, granted to the son of Briccius.

Briccius Báthory (also Báthori or Bátori, Hungarian: Bátori Bereck; died around 1322) was a Hungarian nobleman and the founder of the renowned Báthory family.

== Biography ==
His father was Andrew of Rakamaz, surnamed the Bald, son of Nikolaus, from the Gutkeled clan. Andrew is mentioned in 1250 as a patron of the monastery of Sárvár in the county of Szatmár.

In 1279, Briccius (together with his brothers George (d. 1307) and Benedict (d. 1321) and his uncle Hodos was rewarded by King Ladislaus IV for military services by granting them Bátor in the county of Szabolcs.

In 1310, Bátor came into the sole possession of Briccius when he reached an agreement with his nephew Michael and his cousin Vid to divide the joint possessions. After this, Briccius and his descendants named themselves "of Bátor" or Báthory.

Briccius fathered five sons from his wife, an unidentified daughter of Marhard Nadabi from the Csák clan:

- John I, the first-born son of Briccius, became Count of Szatmár.
- Andrew II (d. 1345) became Bishop of Varadinum.
- Laurence I died without issue.
- Nicolaus I (d. 1357/63) became Count of Csongrád.
- Luke (d. 1330), the youngest son, who possessed wide estates in Szatmár and was granted the lordship of Ecsed.

Among these John was the ancestor of the Báthory of Somlyó, the elder branch of the family, while Luke was the ancestor of the Báthory of Ecsed, the younger branch.
