= Sebastian, son of Bensa =

13th century Hungarian nobleman and soldier

Sebastian

Ispán of Torna
- Reign: 1274
- Predecessor: Buzád
- Successor: Stephen, son of Tekesh
- Died: before 1288
- Father: Bensa

Sebastian, son of Bensa (Hungarian: Bensa fia Sebestyén; died before 1288) was a Hungarian nobleman and soldier in the second half of the 13th century, who served as ispán of Torna County in 1274.

== Career ==
Sebastian was born into an unidentified noble family. His father was a certain Bensa. Sebastian participated in the 1271 war against the Kingdom of Bohemia. He fought in the decisive battle on the Rábca River on 21 May, when Stephen V's army routed Ottokar II's troops. The Bohemian army withdrew from Hungary thereafter. Sebastian served in the fort of Koprivnica (Kapronca) in Slavonia in the summer of 1272, when Stephen's son and heir, the 10-year-old Ladislaus was abducted and imprisoned there by the lord of the castle, Joachim Gutkeled. King Ladislaus' charter from 1274 (under the influence of Joachim and his allies), euphemistically and falsely narrates that Sebastian "served faithfully [...] in the castle of Koprivnica, where we retreated before [the wrath of] our dearest father [Stephen V]". During the Bohemian invasion of Northwest Hungary in the spring of 1273, Sebastian bravely fought at the forts of Győr in August and Detrekő (today near Plavecké Podhradie, Slovakia) in October.

Sebastian elevated into the position of ispán of Torna County by August 1274. The last known predecessor was Buzád, who held the dignity in February 1272. For his military service and loyalty, Sebastian was granted a portion from Homokterenye in Nógrád County on 21 August 1274 by Ladislaus IV. The acquired land adjacent to Sebastian's estate there, previously belonged to the privilege property of the royal falconers and hunters ("darócs"). One day later, Sebastian obtained the estate of Nyilas in Torna County (today a waste near Lak) from the Hungarian monarch. Sebastian held his dignity until early 1277 at the latest, as Stephen, son of Tekesh was styled as "perpetual count" of Torna County in that year. The Tekesh sons were granted the whole county and its castle, Szádvár around that time. Sebastian died sometime before 1288, as the estate of Nyilas was already owned by a certain Dominic, son of Wulch in that year. His another village, Homokterenye also had different owners, the grandsons of Lawrence Baksa by 1296.

== Sources ==
- Kádár, Tamás (2013). "Történeti valóság és manipulált, illetve meghamisított politikai emlékezet Magyarországon IV. László király uralkodása első éveiben [Historical Reality and Manipulated and Forged Political Memory in Hungary During the First Regnal Years of King Ladislaus IV]". Fons. 20 (4). Szentpétery Imre Történettudományi Alapítvány: 525–540. ISSN 1217-8020.
- Zsoldos, Attila (2011). Magyarország világi archontológiája, 1000–1301 [Secular Archontology of Hungary, 1000–1301] (in Hungarian). História, MTA Történettudományi Intézete. ISBN 978-963-9627-38-3.

Political offices
Preceded by Buzád	Ispán of Torna; 1274	Succeeded by Stephen
