= Čičarovce =

Village and municipality in Slovakia

Čičarovce Csicser
- Municipality
- Flag

- Location of Čičarovce in the Košice Region Location of Čičarovce in Slovakia
- Coordinates: 48.55°N 22.03°E
- Country: Slovakia
- Region: Košice Region
- District: Michalovce District
- First mentioned: 1263

Area
  - Total: 26.63 km^{2} (10.28 sq mi)
- Elevation: 105 m (344 ft)

Population (2025)
  - Total: 925
- Time zone: UTC+1 (CET)
  - Summer (DST): UTC+2 (CEST)
- Postal code: 767 1
- Area code: +421 56
- Vehicle registration plate (until 2022): MI
- Website: www.obeccicarovce.sk

Čičarovce (Slovak pronunciation: [ˈtʂitʂarɔwtse]; Hungarian: Csicser) is a village and municipality in Michalovce District in the Kosice Region of eastern Slovakia.

== History ==
In historical records the village was first mentioned in 1263. Before the establishment of independent Czechoslovakia in 1918, it was part of Ung County within the Kingdom of Hungary.

== Geography ==
The municipality lies at an altitude of 105 metres (344 ft) and covers an area of 26.63 km^{2} (10.28 sq mi) (2025).

== Population ==
Population statistic (10 years)
Year	1995	2005	2015	2025
Count	731	867	907	925
Difference		+18.60%	+4.61%	+1.98%

Population statistic
Year	2024	2025
Count	928	925
Difference		−0.32%

It has a population of 925 people (31 December 2025).

=== Ethnicity ===
Census 2021 (1+ %)
Ethnicity	Number	Fraction
Hungarian	646	71.61%
Romani	163	18.07%
Slovak	105	11.64%
Not found out	24	2.66%
Total	902	

In year 2021 was 902 people by ethnicity 646 as Hungarian, 163 as Romani, 105 as Slovak, 24 as Not found out, 3 as Czech and 1 as Other.

Note on population: The difference values of population numbers in the table "Population statistic" and in the sections "Ethnicity" & "Religion" is caused by the use of various statistical methods.

=== Religion ===
Census 2021 (1+ %)
Religion	Number	Fraction
Calvinist Church	337	37.36%
Roman Catholic Church	288	31.93%
Greek Catholic Church	187	20.73%
None	48	5.32%
Not found out	23	2.55%
Evangelical Church	10	1.11%
Total	902	

In year 2021 was 902 people by religion 337 from Calvinist Church, 288 from Roman Catholic Church, 187 from Greek Catholic Church, 48 from None, 23 from Not found out, 10 from Evangelical Church, 3 from Other and not ascertained christian church, 3 from Jehovah's Witnesses, 2 from Christian Congregations in Slovakia and 1 from Eastern Orthodox Church.

== Transport ==
The nearest railway station is located 3 kilometres away at Veľké Kapušany which also contains many of the government institutions for the village.

== Genealogical resources ==
The records for genealogical research are available at the state archive "Statny Archiv in Presov, Slovakia"

- Roman Catholic church records (births/marriages/deaths): 1781-1876 (parish A)
- Greek Catholic church records (births/marriages/deaths): 1789-1886 (parish A)
- Reformated church records (births/marriages/deaths): 1771-1856 (parish A)

== See also ==
- List of municipalities and towns in Slovakia
