= Tiszadada =

Coordinates: 48°02′N 21°15′E

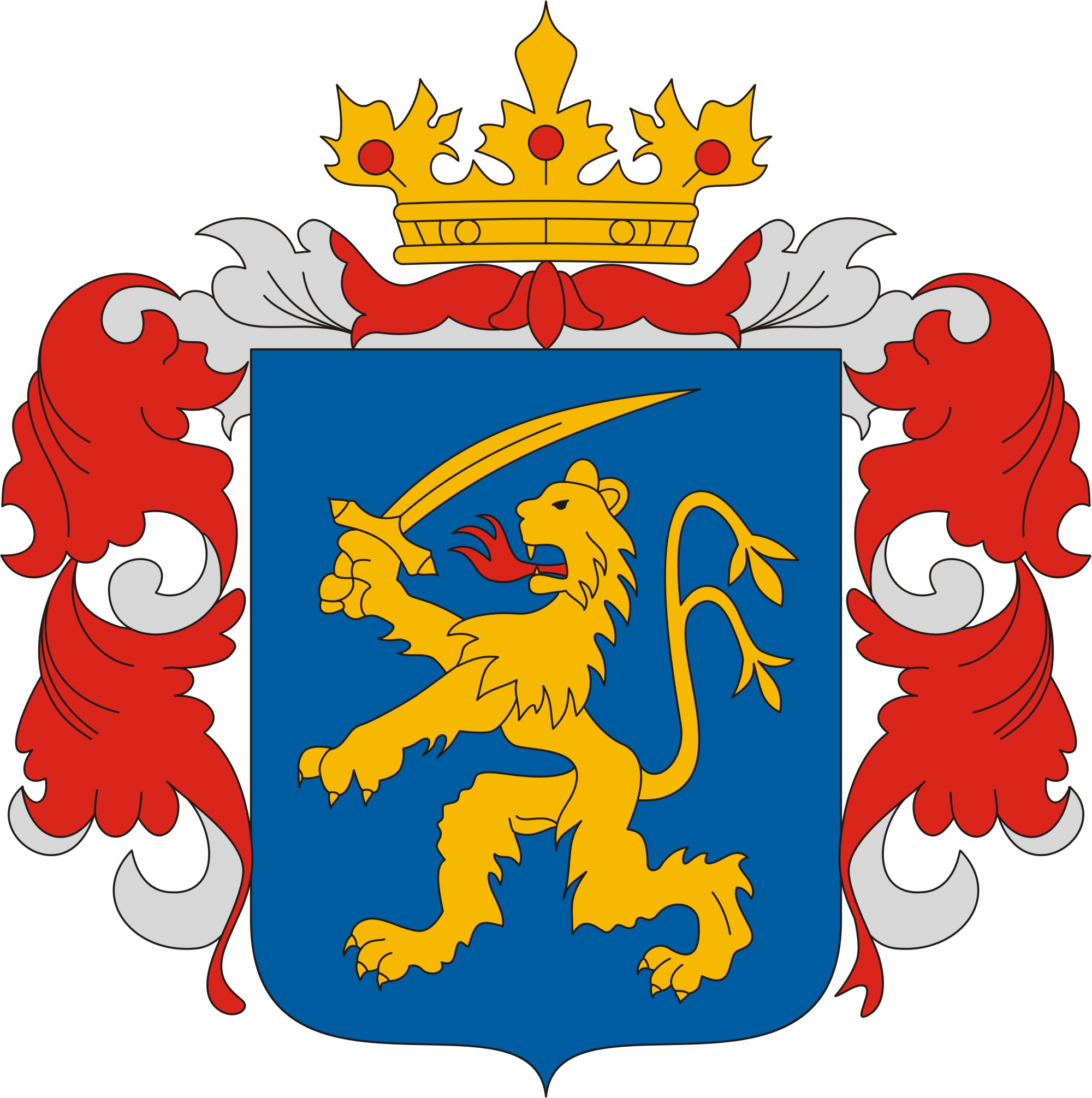
- Coat of arms
- Interactive map of Tiszadada
- Country: Hungary
- County: Szabolcs-Szatmár-Bereg

Area
  - Total: 48.77 km^{2} (18.83 sq mi)

Population (2015)
  - Total: 2,247
  - Density: 46.1/km^{2} (119/sq mi)
- Time zone: UTC+1 (CET)
  - Summer (DST): UTC+2 (CEST)
- Postal code: 4455
- Area code: 42
- Website: https://www.tiszadada.hu

Location of Szabolcs-Szatmar-Bereg county in Hungary

Tiszadada is a village in Szabolcs-Szatmár-Bereg county, in the Northern Great Plain region of eastern Hungary.

== Geography ==
It covers an area of 48.77 km^{2} (19 sq mi) and has a population of 2247 people (2015).

== History ==
Archaeological finds in the village also prove that already in the 4th century BC. In the 19th century, it provided a livelihood for our ancestors even in the Neolithic Age, according to the findings of the finds from the time of the Bükk culture found here. Surely the people of the following ages also settled on the land of Dada, but their existence is revealed only by scattered archaeological finds. The trail of the Csörsz ditch, also known as the Devil's Ditch, built by the Sarmatians between 324 and 337, passes south of the settlement.

Tiszadada was probably the property of the Szabolcs castle estate. The name of the village is of personal origin.

The first mention of a commissioner from 1254 is still terra; it was acquired from the owner by Stephen Ban of the genus Gut-Keled and was also endured by his son in 1300.

A 14-15. It was in the possession of the family during the divisions of the Báthoryak in the 16th century, but in the middle of the 16th century it was owned by several nobles.

1551: Kristóf Dorman, 1563: István Móré, László and Ilona, 1570: Ferenc Zay. The latter was attached to the castle estate in Tokaj, therefore it is not included in the censuses of Szabolcs county.

It was conquered by the Turks in the second half of the century. In 1556 it had about 270-280 inhabitants.

In 1588, 28 serfs of István Móré, Ferenc Dely, Gáspár Mágócsy and Boldizsár Csomaközy lived in it.

In 1618 he had nine landlords, most of whom were owned by András Csomaközy (15 serfs). A total of 72 serf families lived throughout the village.

It was owned by the descendants of 16th century families (Dorman, Dely, Móré, Tibay) even in the 17th century.

During the 17th century, part of it was given to the Barakonyi family by one of the Transylvanian princes; In 1668, Ferenc Barakonyi settled landlords in Hajdú. They may have been noble in the beginning, or later acquired an armal, because in 1707 the village was called a curiosity, and they acquired several plots of land from the landlords Ferenc Gyulay, Boldizsár Csomaközy and the descendants of Fülöp Móré.

Two-thirds of the village belonged to the treasury in the 18th century; in the third third, descendants of noble families (Csihat, Fekete, Hadas, Balogh, Mészáros, Pethő and Széles) lived.

At the end of the 18th century there were four landlords, the 93 serf and cellar families in Patay, Szepessy, gr. It was supported by Gyulay and the Szikszay family. Around 1839, it had a population of 2,444, and in addition to the above, the Bónis, Désy, Lónyai, Máriássy, and Zathureczky families were landlords.

Süldő, a village inhabited until the 14th century, which was bordered by Rázom in 1307, merged into its border, so it was located in the eastern part of the border.

In 1325 it was the property of the Balogsemjén clan, and in 1324 a chapel built in honor of St. Imre stood inside.

Tiszadada was also inhabited in the Árpádian period, which is also mentioned in the Oradea Register.

It was the property of the Szabolcs manor, the earliest date referring to it was in 1254. It was acquired by István bán from its owner, and it was also owned by his son in 1300.

In the second half of the 13th century, a round-nave church with an eastern apse was built for the use of István Gut-Keled or his son.

The priest named István of the church dedicated to the Knight of George is mentioned in the papal tithe register between 1332-35. The ancient church was blown up in 1944 by retreating German troops. The current new Reformed church was built using the materials of the ruins.

Tiszadada is trying to develop in the 21st century, but it is also trying to preserve its traditions and the character of a holiday village. Currently, the majority of the population lives off agriculture.
