= Rakamaz =

- Town
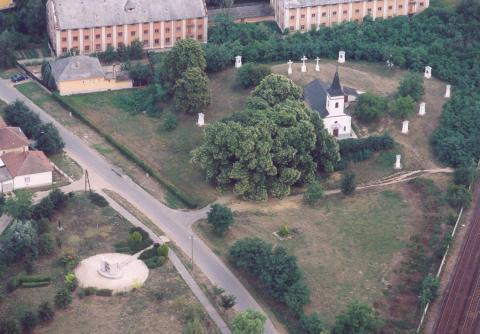
- Aerial view

- Flag Coat of arms

- Location of Rakamaz in Hungary
- Coordinates: 48.1175°N 21.4778°E
- Country: Hungary
- Region: Northern Great Plain
- County: Szabolcs-Szatmár-Bereg

Government
  - Mayor: Bodnár László (Ind.)

Area
  - Total: 42.64 km^{2} (16.46 sq mi)

Population (2015 Jan. 1.)
  - Total: 4,374
  - Density: 102.6/km^{2} (265.7/sq mi)
- Time zone: UTC+1 (CET)
  - Summer (DST): UTC+2 (CEST)
- Postal code: 4465
- Area code: +36 42
- Website: http://rakamaz.hu/

Rakamaz is a town in Szabolcs-Szatmár-Bereg county, in the Northern Great Plain region of eastern Hungary.

== Geography ==
It covers an area of 42.64 km^{2} (16 sq mi) and has a population of 4374 people (2015).

== Sights ==
It is famous for the Turul bird located next to the library.

== History ==
Rakamaz is one of the oldest cities in Szabolcs-Szatmár-Bereg county, since it is estimated to have been created in 1067. We do not yet know how the name was created.
