= Tiszapalkonya =

- Village
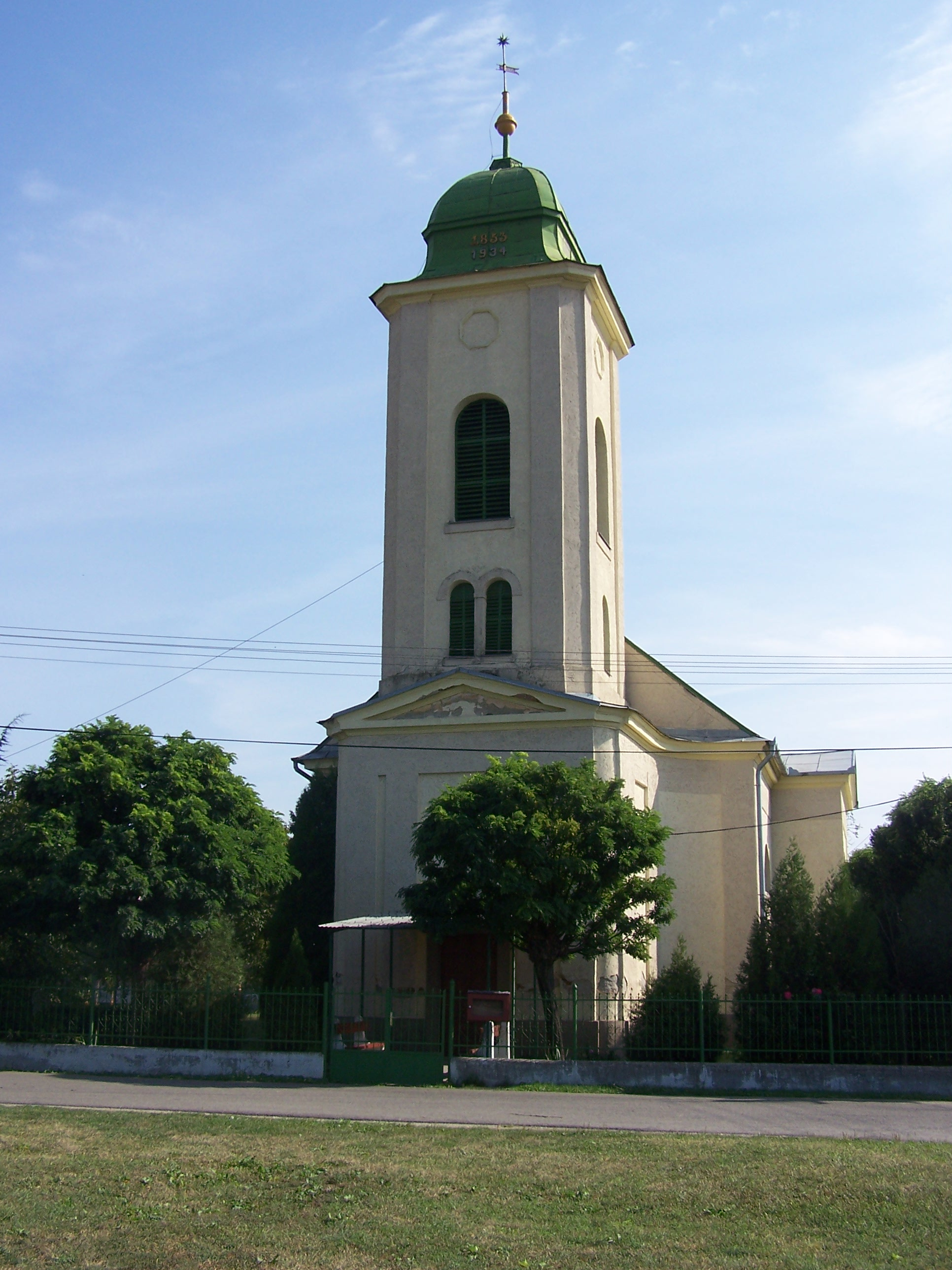

- Flag Coat of arms

- Location of Tác
- Coordinates: 47.88516°N 21.05520°E
- Country: Hungary
- Region: Northern Hungary
- County: Borsod-Abaúj-Zemplén
- District: Tiszaújváros

Area
  - Total: 13.49 km^{2} (5.21 sq mi)

Population (1 January 2026)
  - Total: 1,402
  - Density: 103.9/km^{2} (269.2/sq mi)
- Time zone: UTC+1 (CET)
  - Summer (DST): UTC+2 (CEST)
- Postal code: 3587
- Area code: (+36) 49
- Website: www.tiszapalkonya.hu

Tiszapalkonya is a village in Borsod-Abaúj-Zemplén county, Hungary.
