= Sankt Margarethen im Burgenland =

- Municipality
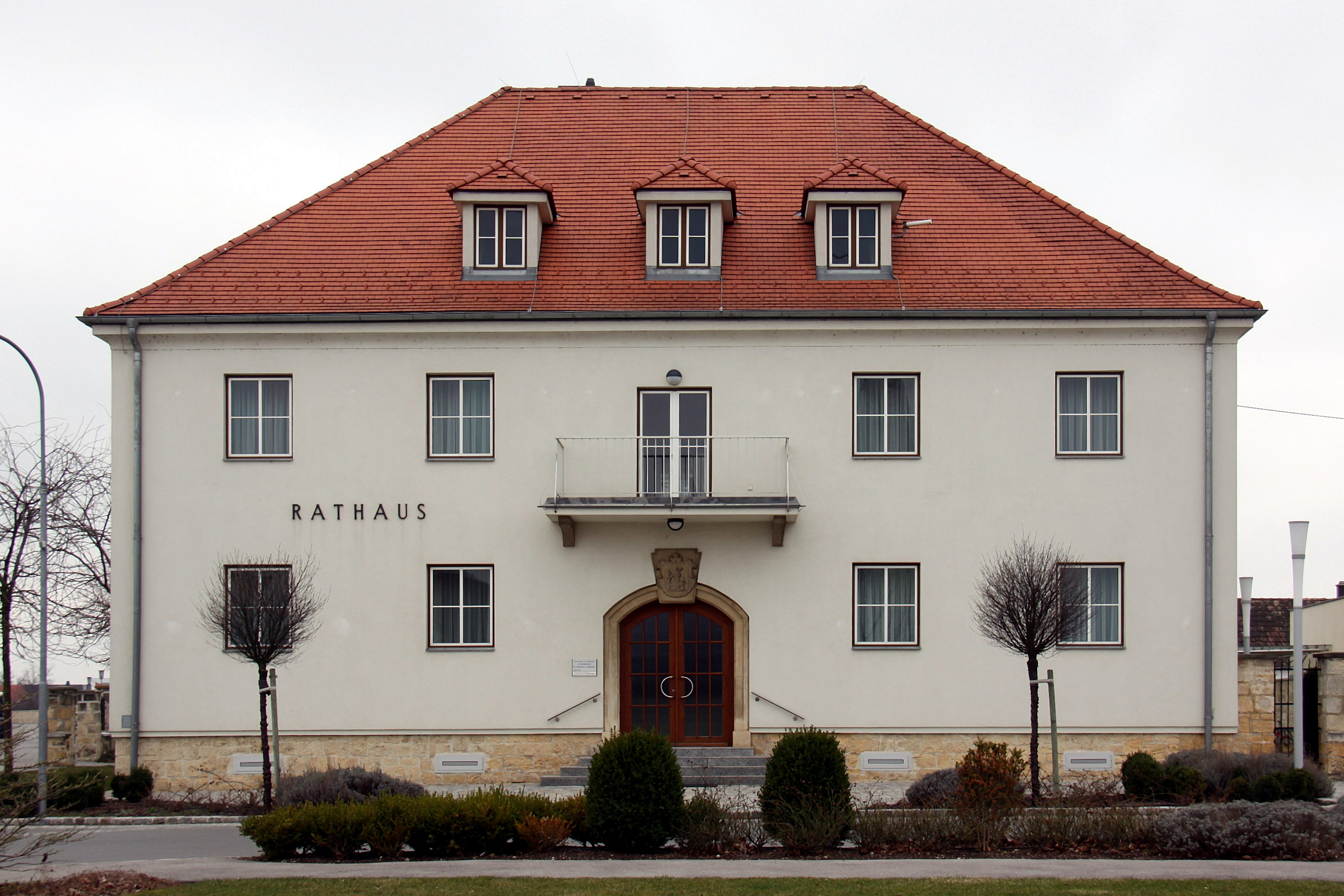
- Town hall

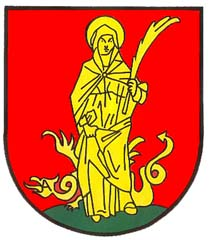
- Coat of arms

- Location within Burgenland Location within Austria
- Coordinates: 47°48′N 16°36′E
- Country: Austria
- State: Burgenland
- District: Eisenstadt-Umgebung

Government
  - Mayor: Eduard Scheuhammer (ÖVP)

Area
  - Total: 26.54 km^{2} (10.25 sq mi)
- Elevation: 151 m (495 ft)

Population (2022-01-01)
  - Total: 2,691
  - Density: 101.4/km^{2} (262.6/sq mi)
- Time zone: UTC+1 (CET)
  - Summer (DST): UTC+2 (CEST)
- Postal code: 7062
- Website: www.st-margarethen.at

Sankt Margarethen im Burgenland (Hungarian: Szentmargitbánya) is a town in Burgenland near the state capital of Eisenstadt, in Austria. It is home to a large 1st-century Roman quarry. A passion play has been presented in St Margarethen each summer for over seventy years. The town is close to the border with Hungary. The Pan-European Picnic peace demonstration was held near St. Margarethen in 1989 at the close of the Cold War.

== Roman Quarry ==
The Roman Quarry has recently been transformed to cutting edge event venue. The architecture blends with the natural surroundings. A corten steel ramp makes the quarry accessible to all audiences.

== Population ==
Historical population
Year	Pop.	±%
1869	1,911	—
1880	2,066	+8.1%
1890	2,197	+6.3%
1900	2,244	+2.1%
1910	2,141	−4.6%
1923	2,062	−3.7%
1934	2,307	+11.9%
1939	2,559	+10.9%
1951	2,268	−11.4%
1961	2,363	+4.2%
1971	2,546	+7.7%
1981	2,603	+2.2%
1991	2,608	+0.2%
2001	2,762	+5.9%
2011	2,732	−1.1%
2021	2,683	−1.8%
