= Slavsko Polje =

Slavsko Polje Славско Поље (Serbian)
- Village
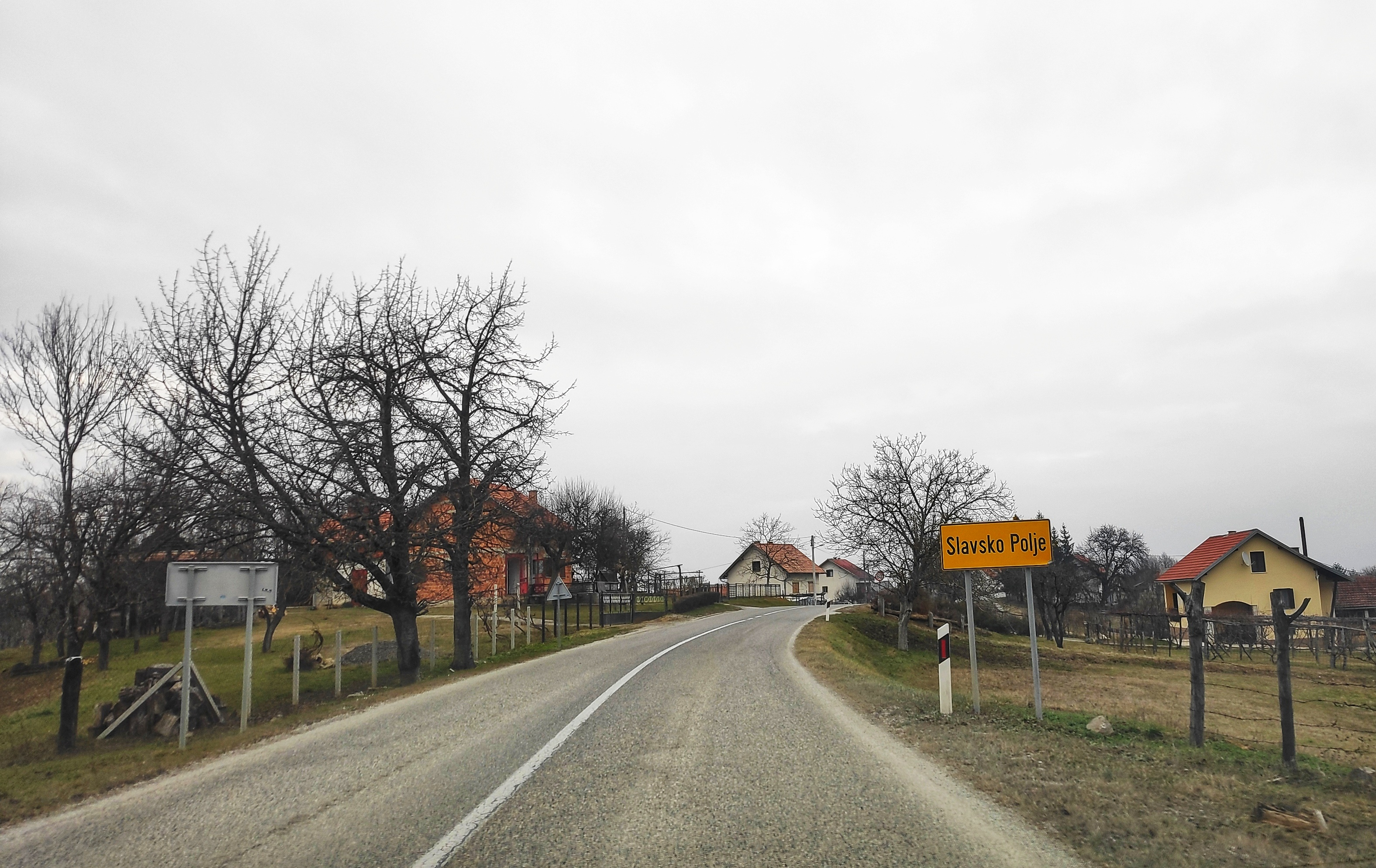

- Location of Slavsko Polje in Croatia
- Coordinates: 45°21′55″N 15°48′46″E
- Country: Croatia
- Region: Continental Croatia
- County: Sisak-Moslavina County
- Municipality: Gvozd

Area
  - Total: 16.0 km^{2} (6.2 sq mi)
- Elevation: 167 m (548 ft)

Population (2021)
  - Total: 215
  - Density: 13.4/km^{2} (34.8/sq mi)
- Time zone: UTC+1 (CET)
  - Summer (DST): UTC+2 (CEST)
- Postal codes: 44410
- Area code: (+385) 44

Slavsko Polje (Serbian Cyrillic: Славско Поље) is a village in central Croatia, in the municipality of Gvozd, Sisak-Moslavina County. It is connected by the D6 highway.

== History ==
In the late 17th century, the village became a part of the Military Frontier. In the 18th century, it belonged to the Glina regiment. The development of the Vrginmost-Karlovac railway line in 1905 was important for the village's development as it provided employment (i.e. railway maintenance work) and allowed residents to seek employment and engage in trade further afield. In 1918, the village became a part of the Serbian-Croatian-Slovenian Kingdom and later on, the Kingdom of Yugoslavia.

The village suffered heavy demographic losses in World War II with 417 of its residents perishing. Of those, 235 were civilian victims of fascism while 81 died as partisan resistance fighters, and others succumbed to typhoid. In the Glina massacres alone, 136 men and boys lost their lives in early August 1941. The first residents losing their lives already in May 1941 perished in the Jadovno concentration camp while some of its captured partisans died as prisoners of war in far away Norway. After being heavily hit by the brutal Ustaše campaign in summer 1941, the population joined the antifascist resistance movement en masse.

On 27 March 2022 at 16:33 the ŽC 112 Sisak received a call about a wildfire in the area. 50 hectares (120 acres) burned by the time it was put out at 20:30 by DVD Gvozd.

== Demographics ==
According to the 2011 census, the village of Slavsko Polje has 338 inhabitants. This represents 44.95% of its pre-war population according to the 1991 census.

Population by ethnicity

Year of census	total	Serbs	Croats	Yugoslavs	others
2011	338	323 (95.56%)	14 (4.14%)	-	1 (0.3%)
2001	375	n/a	n/a	-	n/a
1991	752	698 (92.82%)	8 (1.06%)	13 (1.73%)	33 (4.39%)
1981	985	883 (89.65%)	8 (0.81%)	82 (8.33%)	12 (1.21%)
1971	1 115	1 100 (98.66%)	8 (0.72%)	1 (0.08%)	6 (0.54%)

Historical population 1857-2011
v

population	1010	1161	1040	1229	1296	1402	1426	1747	1173	1245	1247	1115	985	752	375	338
	1857	1869	1880	1890	1900	1910	1921	1931	1948	1953	1961	1971	1981	1991	2001	2011

Sources: Croatian Bureau of Statistics publications

== Sports ==
- Zavičaj Slavsko Polje, soccer club

== Sights ==
- Monument to the uprising of the people of Kordun and Banija

== Notable natives and residents ==
- Branko Mamula (1921-2021) - antifascist, resistance fighter, admiral of the JNA and Minister of Defence of Yugoslavia in period 1982—1988
- Simo Vučinić (1915-1943) - antifascist, partisan and People's Hero of Yugoslavia

== See also ==
- Glina massacres
