= Paul Gutkeled =

Hungarian lord

Ban of Severin
- Reign: 1272 until 1275
- Predecessor: Albert Ákos (first rule); Ugrin Csák (second and third rule)
- Successor: Ugrin Csák (first rule); Mikod Kökényesradnót (second rule); Lawrence (third rule)
- Noble family: gens Gutkeled
- Issue: Miklós Buthkai; István Málczay (Márki); Vid Ráskay de Ráska a daughter
- Father: Stephen I Gutkeled

Paul Gutkeled (Hungarian: Gutkeled Pál) was a Hungarian influential lord, ban of Severin between 1272 and 1275 under Ladislaus IV of Hungary reign.

== Career in Hungary ==
He was appointed many times as ban of Severin by king Ladislaus IV of Hungary between 1272 and 1275.

== Sources ==
- Hóman, Bálint (1928). "Tatárveszedelem. Osztrák és cseh háborúk.". Magyar történet (in Hungarian). Vol. II : A rendiség kialakulásának kora. ISBN 978-963-3276-96-9.

Paul Genus Gutkeled
Political offices
Preceded by Albert Ákos (first rule); Ugrin Csák (second and third rule)	Ban of Severin; 1272–1275	Succeeded by Ugrin Csák (first rule); Mikod Kökényesradnót (second rule); Lawrence (third rule)
