= Zagreb County (former) =

Historic county of the Kingdom of Croatia-Slavonia

Zagreb County Zagrebačka županija Zágráb vármegye
- County of the Kingdom of Croatia-Slavonia
- 12th century–1920
- Coat of arms

- Location of the County (red) within the Kingdom of Croatia-Slavonia (white)
- Capital: Zagreb
- Area
  - Coordinates: 45°49′N 15°59′E
  - 1910: 7,210 km^{2} (2,780 sq mi)
- Population
  - 1910: 594,052
- History
  - Established: 12th century
  - Treaty of Trianon: 4 June 1920
| Succeeded by |
| Kingdom of Serbs, Croats and Slovenes |
- Today part of: Croatia

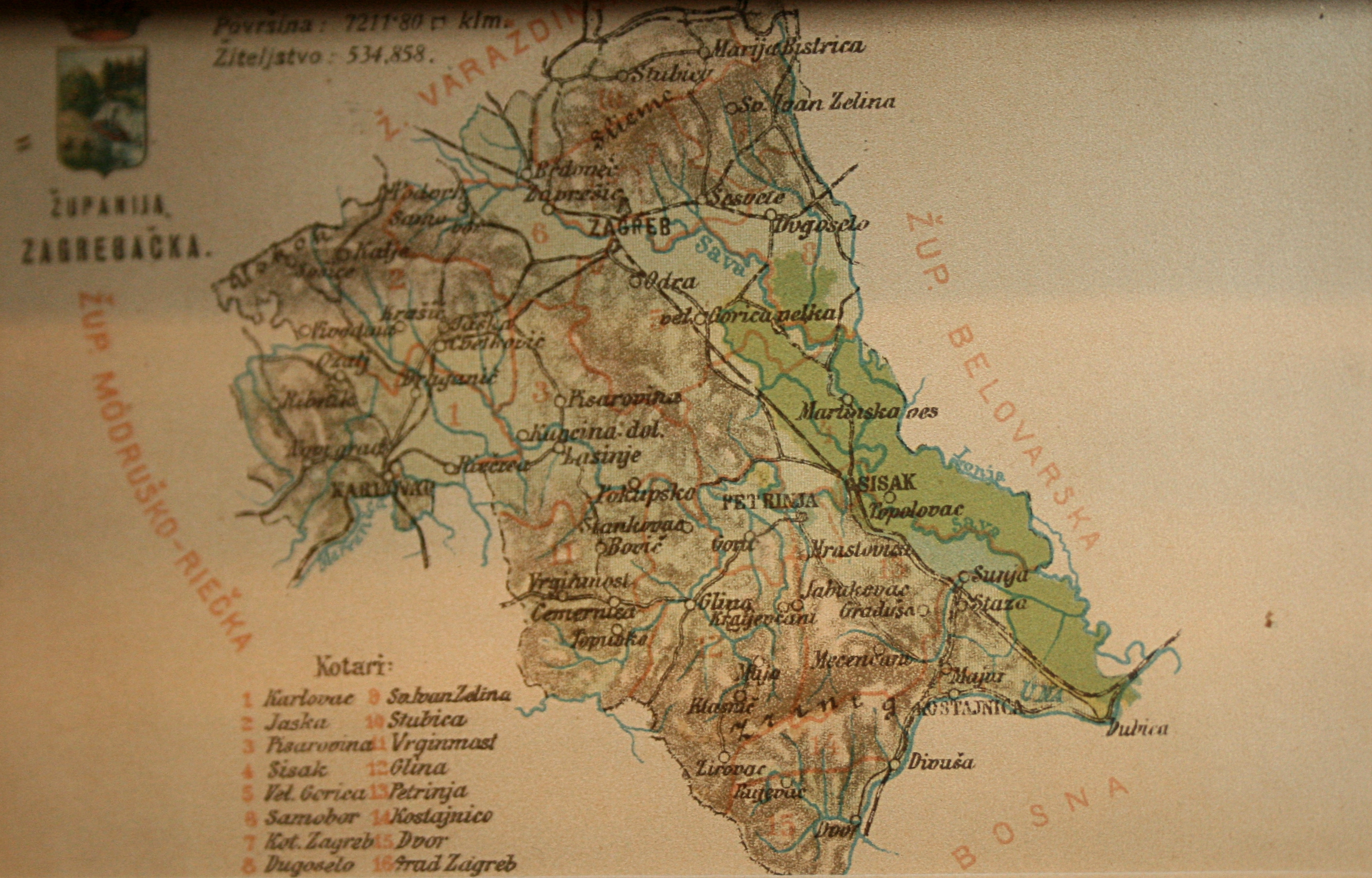
Old map of Zagreb County

Zagreb County (Croatian: Zagrebačka županija; Hungarian: Zágráb vármegye) was a historic administrative subdivision (županija) of the Kingdom of Croatia-Slavonia. Croatia-Slavonia was an autonomous kingdom within the Lands of the Crown of Saint Stephen (Transleithania), the Hungarian part of the dual Austro-Hungarian Empire. Its territory is now in northern Croatia. The capital of the county was Zagreb (Croatian, in Hungarian: Zágráb).

== Geography ==
Zagreb County shared borders with the Austrian lands Styria, Carniola and Bosnia-Herzegovina and the counties of Varaždin County, Bjelovar-Križevci, Požega and Modruš-Rijeka (all in Croatia-Slavonia). The river Sava flows through the county. Its area was 7210 km^{2} around 1910.

== History ==
The territory of the Zagreb County was part of the Kingdom of Croatia when it entered a personal union with the Kingdom of Hungary in 1102, and with it became part of the Habsburg monarchy in 1526. Zagreb County was re-established after it was liberated from Ottoman occupation in the early 18th century. In 1920, by the Treaty of Trianon the county became part of the newly formed Kingdom of Serbs, Croats and Slovenes (later renamed to Yugoslavia). Since 1991, when Croatia became independent from Yugoslavia, the county is part of the Republic of Croatia.

== Demographics ==
In 1900, the county had a population of 541,242 people and was composed of the following linguistic communities:

Total:

- Croatian: 403,020 (74.5%)
- Serbian: 113,129 (20.9%)
- German: 6,034 (1.1%)
- Hungarian: 4,403 (0.8%)
- Slovak: 188 (0.0%)
- Romanian: 22 (0.0%)
- Ruthenian: 18 (0.0%)
- Other or unknown: 14,428 (2.7%)

According to the census of 1900, the county was composed of the following religious communities:

Total:

- Roman Catholic: 414,680 (76.6%)
- Serbian Orthodox: 113,265 (20.9%)
- Greek Catholic: 7,561 (1.4%)
- Jewish: 4,659 (0.9%)
- Lutheran: 740 (0.1%)
- Calvinist: 271 (0.0%)
- Unitarian: 6 (0.0%)
- Other or unknown: 60 (0.0%)

In 1910, the county had a population of 594,052 people and was composed of the following linguistic communities:

Total:

- Croatian: 445,870 (75.1%)
- Serbian: 122,558 (20.6%)
- German: 6,016 (1.0%)
- Hungarian: 6,068 (1.0%)
- Slovak: 235 (0.0%)
- Romanian: 30 (0.0%)
- Ruthenian: 61 (0.0%)
- Other or unknown: 13,214 (2.2%)

According to the census of 1910, the county was composed of the following religious communities:

Total:

- Roman Catholic: 456,423 (76.8%)
- Serbian Orthodox: 122,861 (20.7%)
- Greek Catholic: 7,458 (1.3%)
- Jewish: 5,680 (1.0%)
- Lutheran: 785 (0.1%)
- Calvinist: 742 (0.1%)
- Unitarian: 4 (0.0%)
- Other or unknown: 99 (0.0%)

== Subdivisions ==
In the early 20th century, the subdivisions of Zagreb county were:

Districts
| District | Capital |
|---|---|
| Dugoszolo | hr: Dugo Selo |
| Dvor | Dvor |
| Glina | Glina |
| Jasztrebarszka | hr: Jastrebarsko |
| Károlyváros | hr: Karlovac |
| Kostajnica | Kostajnica |
| Nagygorica | hr: Velika Gorica |
| Petrinya | hr: Petrinja |
| Pisarovina | Pisarovina |
| Szamobor | hr: Samobor |
| Stubica | Donja Stubica |
| Szentivánzelina | hr: Sveti Ivan Zelina |
| Sziszek | hr: Sisak |
| Topuszka | hr: Topusko |
| Zágráb | hr: Zagreb |
Urban counties
Zagreb
Urban districts
Karlovac
Petrinja
Sisak
