= Peace of Pressburg (1271) =

1271 treaty between Bohemia and Hungary

The Peace of Pressburg was a peace treaty concluded in Pressburg (then Pozsony, today's Bratislava) during the War of the Babenberg Succession. It was signed on 2 July 1271 between King Ottokar II of Bohemia and King Stephen V of Hungary. Under this agreement, Hungary renounced its claims on western Austrian provinces and Ottokar renounced the support of Stephen's internal opposition and promised the extradition of them.

== Signatories ==
Stephen V of Hungary

1. Mojs, Palatine of Hungary, ispán of Sopron County and Judge of the Cumans
2. Egidius Monoszló, Master of the treasury and ispán of Pozsony County
3. Nicholas Monoszló, Judge royal and ispán of Somogy County
4. Joachim Gutkeled, Ban of Slavonia
5. Matthew Csák, Voivode of Transylvania and ispán of Szolnok County
6. Lawrence, son of Kemény, Ban of Severin and ispán of Doboka County
7. banus Roland Rátót
8. Peter Csák, Master of the stewards and župan of Gacka (Gecske)
9. Albert Ákos, Master of the horse and ispán of Szeben County
10. Philip Kórógyi, Master of the cupbearers
11. banus Ernye Ákos, ispán of Varaždin County
12. banus Panyit Miskolc, ispán of Zala County
13. Michael Rosd, ispán of Nyitra County
14. banus Paul Gutkeled, ispán of Bács County
15. Denis Péc, źupan of Moravče (Marócsa)
16. magister Andrew, źupan of Rovišće (Rojcsa)
17. Peter, ispán of Szana County

Ottokar II of Bohemia

1. Andrew, royal treasurer of Bohemia
2. Yeroschius de Vvhsberch
3. Jaroslaus de Lewnberch
4. Borscho de Risemburch
5. Zbizlaus, castellan of Prague
6. Iarrso de Waldemberch
7. Dietrich, vice-treasurer of Bohemia
8. Bawarus de Straconicz
9. Hynko de Luhtemburch
10. Stenk, brother of Smil
11. Hartlibus, royal treasurer of Moravia
12. Bohuš, marshal
13. Bnezta, Master of the stewards
14. Nezamysl, Master of the cup-bearers of Moravia
15. Milota of Dědice, brother of Beneš
16. Cuno, brother of Zmizlo
17. Otto von Haslau
18. Otto II. von Perchtoldsdorf
19. Heutef de Howuelde

== Ecclesiastical guarantors ==
Hungarian prelates

1. Stephen Báncsa, Archbishop of Kalocsa, royal chancellor
2. Lampert Hont-Pázmány, Bishop of Eger
3. Job Záh, Bishop of Pécs
4. Philip, Bishop of Vác
5. Paul Balog, Bishop of Veszprém
6. Timothy, Bishop of Zagreb
7. Ladislaus, Bishop of Knin

Imperial prelates

1. Frederick II of Walchen, Archbishop of Salzburg
2. Jan III of Dražice, Bishop of Prague
3. Bruno von Schauenburg, Bishop of Olomouc
4. Peter, Bishop of Passau
5. Conrad II Wildgraf of Dhaun, Bishop of Freising
6. Leo Thundorfer, Bishop of Regensburg

== Sources ==
- Rudolf, Veronika (2023). Közép-Európa a hosszú 13. században [Central Europe in the Long 13th Century] (in Hungarian). Arpadiana XV., Research Centre for the Humanities. ISBN 978-963-416-406-7.
