= Mojs I Ákos =

Hungarian baron

Mojs (I) Ákos
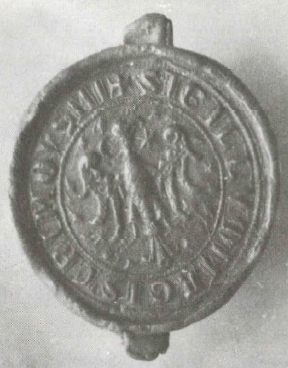
- Seal of Mojs (I) Ákos, 1299

Master of the treasury
- Reign: 1291
- Predecessor: Ivan Kőszegi
- Successor: Dominic Rátót
- Died: after 1299
- Noble family: gens Ákos
- Issue: Mojs II; Ellős a daughter
- Father: Albert

Mojs (I) from the kindred Ákos (also Moys, Majs or Majos; Hungarian: Ákos nembeli (I.) Mojs; died after 1299) was a Hungarian baron at the end of the 13th century, who served as Master of the treasury in 1291.

== Family ==
His name derived from the Latin variant (Moyses) of the biblical name Moses. Mojs was born into the Ernye branch of the gens (clan) Ákos as the son of Albert the Great (Master of the horse from 1270 to 1272 and Ban of Severin in 1272), he had also two younger brothers, John and Ákos. Mojs' uncle was Judge royal Ernye Ákos, thus he was also a cousin of the oligarch Stephen Ákos.

Mojs I had at least three children from his unidentified wife; Mojs II who made an alliance with oligarch James Borsa and the sons of the late Ladislaus Kán in 1315 and caused a rebellion against Charles I of Hungary; magister Ellős who died before 1329 and a daughter who married to Andrew Sárpataki.

== Career ==
He was first mentioned by contemporary records in 1278, when he and his brothers donated the estate of Dicsőszentmárton (today Târnăveni, Romania) to their familiaris, a certain Paul for his faithful service, in exchange for 50 marks. He functioned as ispán of Ung County in 1284. According to a non-authentic charter issued in 1289, he held the position of Voivode of Transylvania from 1287 to 1288. Although that diploma is definitely a forgery, should be considered that there is no information on Roland Borsa's second voivodeship (1284–1294) for the period between the summer of 1285 and 1288. If Mojs I actually held the office then he was also ispán of Szolnok County in the same period.

On the instruction of Lodomer, Archbishop of Esztergom and the archiepiscopal synod, Árbóc (a Cuman maternal relative of King Ladislaus IV of Hungary) and Mojs I were arrested and held in captivity by Peter Monoszló, the Bishop of Transylvania in 1288, because Lodomer mistakenly thought that they had planned to go the Mongols as the envoys of Ladislaus IV whose relationship was severely burdened with the Catholic Church. They were released soon.

By 1291, Mojs I was appointed Count of the Székelys. He appeared in the dignity (as the first known office-holder since 1228, when Bogomer Ludány held the office) on 12 March 1291, when King Andrew III of Hungary confirmed his predecessor Ladislaus' land donations to the Székelys of Aranyos Seat. He was succeeded by Peter Bő in the position by June 1294. Mojs Ákos briefly served as Master of the treasury from around October to December 1291, succeeding the rebellious Ivan Kőszegi. Mojs was replaced by Dominic Rátót still in that year. He was among the barons of Andrew III of Hungary in 1296. He served as Master of the treasury for Queen Agnes of Austria from 1298 to 1299.

== Sources ==
- Engel, Pál (2001). The Realm of St Stephen: A History of Medieval Hungary, 895–1526. I.B. Tauris Publishers. ISBN 1-86064-061-3.
- Kordé, Zoltán (2001). "A székely ispáni méltóság kezdeteiről [About the origin of the office of the count of the Székelys]". In Barbu, Violeta; Tüdős S., Kinga (eds.). Historia manet. Volum omagial. Demény Lajos emlékkönyv (in Hungarian). Editura Kriterion. pp. 199–207. OCLC 895131650.
- Markó, László (2006). A magyar állam főméltóságai Szent Istvántól napjainkig: Életrajzi Lexikon [Great Officers of State in Hungary from King Saint Stephen to Our Days: A Biographical Encyclopedia] (in Hungarian). Helikon Kiadó. ISBN 963-208-970-7.
- Zsoldos, Attila (2011). Magyarország világi archontológiája, 1000–1301 [Secular Archontology of Hungary, 1000–1301] (in Hungarian). História, MTA Történettudományi Intézete. ISBN 978-963-9627-38-3.

Mojs I Genus Ákos Born: ? Died: after 1299
Political offices
Preceded by Roland Borsa	Voivode of Transylvania uncertain 1287–c. 1288	Succeeded by Roland Borsa
Preceded by unknown	Count of the Székelys; 1291	Succeeded by Peter Bő
Preceded by Ivan Kőszegi	Master of the treasury 1291	Succeeded by Dominic Rátót
