= Mojs II Ákos =

Hungarian lord

Mojs (II) Ákos

Master of the cupbearers
- Reign: 1313–1314
- Predecessor: Nicholas Rátót (?)
- Successor: Gregory Domoszlói
- Died: early 1320; Bonchida, Kingdom of Hungary (today Bonțida, Romania)
- Noble family: gens Ákos
- Spouse: N Borsa
- Father: Mojs I

Mojs (II) from the kindred Ákos (also Moys, Majs or Majos; Hungarian: Ákos nembeli (II.) Mojs; died early 1320) was a Hungarian rebellious lord, who belonged to the powerful Borsa kinship. He was one of the most ardent enemies of King Charles I during the last stage of the era of "feudal anarchy".

== Family affairs and possessions ==
His name derived from the Latin variant (Moyses) of the biblical name Moses. He was born into the so-called Ernye branch of the gens Ákos as the eldest son of Mojs I, who served as Count of the Székelys, then Master of the treasury in the Queen's court. He had two siblings, a brother Ellős (Achilles), who supported his efforts during King Charles' unification war, and a sister, who married a certain Andrew Sárpataki. Historian Attila Zsoldos argued Sárpataki is identical with that Andrew, son of Ipoch from the gens Bogátradvány, whose landholdings in Doboka, Kolozs and Torda counties were confiscated and donated to Thomas Szécsényi by Charles I for his "treachery", as he was a strong supporter of the late Voivode Ladislaus Kán and his family. Zsoldos considered the Sárpatak lordship (today in Albești commune in Romania) contributed to the increase of Mojs and Ellős' influence.

From their father Mojs I, the brothers jointly inherited Buza, Noszoly and Lak in Doboka County (today Buza, Năsal and Lacu in Romania), and Budatelke in Kolozs County (today Budești, Romania). In August 1318, Charles nominally confiscated these lands. Their seized land of Mojspályi was handed over to the King's another loyal soldier Dózsa Debreceni as a royal donation in 1322. Before his betrayal, Mojs II also owned Petresfalva (today Petroșnița in Bucoșnița commune, Romania).

Mojs first appeared in contemporary sources, when he acted as an arbitrator during a lawsuit in Gyulafehérvár (today Alba Iulia, Romania) on 7 March 1313. Sometimes before 1313, Mojs married an unidentified daughter of the powerful baron James Borsa. Thus he became a relative to the Borsa clan, which ruled the area of Tiszántúl de facto independently of the royal power at the turn of the 13th and 14th centuries. James Borsa supported Charles in his war of succession for the Hungarian throne, and served his Palatine from 1306 to 1314. Thanks to the political influence of his father-in-law, Mojs functioned as Master of the cupbearers between around 1313 and 1314. In the same time, a document also styled him as ispán of Bistritz royal estate (today Bistrița, Romania).

== His rebellion ==
In 1314, James Borsa and his kindred turned against Charles. In December, their troops clashed with the royal army at the first time. Soon, the Borsas, who suffered a heavy defeat in the northeastern areas of their province in Tiszántúl, made a ceasefire with the king (for instance, in July 1315, Beke Borsa was made Master of the treasury). Mojs did not participate in the Borsas' first rebellion against Charles. In early 1315, the powerful Ladislaus Kán died, but his sons did not yield to Charles. The king appointed his loyal baron Nicholas Pok as Voivode of Transylvania, and commissioned him to crush their rebellion in the summer of 1315. Sometime in 1315 or 1316, Pok's army was defeated and expelled from Transylvania by Mojs, according to a royal charter issued in August 1318. After his victory, Mojs gained a lot of loot and sent the captured royal banners to his father-in-law James Borsa.

Because of uncertain chronology, there are several contradictory interpretations among the historians to outline the course of events. Historian Pál Engel, who first attempted to reconstruct the order of events in his 1988 study, argued the peace between Charles and the Borsas has collapsed by the first half of 1316. In the same time, Beke was replaced as Master of the treasury by the king's long-time supporter Demetrius Nekcsei. Accordingly, James Borsa made an alliance against Charles with Ladislaus Kán's sons and other lords, including Mojs, the Gutkeleds of Szilágyság (Sălaj) and Peter, son of Petenye. They also offered the crown to Andrew of Galicia. Engel, who connected their conspiracy with Stefan Milutin's campaign against Hungary, argued, they broke the rebellion around the end of 1316. As a part of this, Mojs was victorious over Nicholas Pok and expelled him from Transylvania. In contrast, historian Gyula Kristó argued in his 2003 publication that the skirmish between Mojs Ákos and Nicholas Pok took place at the end of 1315. He highlighted that Pok last appeared as Voivode in contemporary documents in April 1316. Accordingly, Nicholas Pok, who prepared a war against the Káns, arrived on a bypass road across the Meszes Gate (today in Meseș Mountains) from Lippa (today Lipova, Romania) to Transylvania because of Mojs' sudden rebellion, which interrupted and delayed the showdown against the Káns, as Kristó considered. Historian Attila Bárány supported Kristó's theory and noted the appointment of Beke Borsa as Master of the treasury in mid-1315 could mean that he remained loyal to Charles even after 1314, while his brother James and nephew Bekcs rebelled against the royal authority, thus it did not prove the alleged peace between the Borsas and Charles throughout 1315. However historian Attila Zsoldos, who also examined the contents of Nicholas Pok's charters, in addition to the dates and locations, challenged Kristó's interpretation in 2016. He argued, if, as Kristó considered, Nicholas Pok arrived to prepare a war to Transylvania immediately after his appointment, he would not have dealt with insignificant estate affairs in his diplomas as he did. Zsoldos considered, the 1318 charter, which narrated the Voivode's appointment and the following events, twisted the years and Mojs was declared the king's enemy retroactively. He argued the Meszes Gate was chosen as a safer route than the Káns' freshly occupied territory. Thus Zsoldos supported Engel's chronology and dated Mojs' rebellion to Autumn or Winter 1316.

Charles immediately responded to unfavorable developments and launched a multi-faceted war against James Borsa and his allies in early 1317. His military leaders captured several castles of Peter, son of Petenye in Zemplén County in the following months, who sought refuge in the court of Mojs Ákos after that. After Pok's failure, Charles appointed John Fonói as "captain of the Transylvanian parts" and sent him to the province to crush Mojs' insurgency. However, Mojs left Transylvania for a short time and joined the Borsas' army in Tiszántúl. Charles's troops, which were under the command of a former familiaris of the Borsas, Dózsa Debreceni, defeated the rebels' united troops at Debrecen in the first half of 1317 (Zsoldos provided the exact date to 10 February, while another opinions considered the battle took place in 1316). After the defeat, James Borsa barricaded himself into the castle of Adorján Castle (today ruins near Sălard, Romania), while Mojs returned to Transylvania because the monarch launched a simultaneous royal campaign against his territory. In the following months, Charles decisively defeated the Borsas' dominion, leaving Mojs without allies. Many fortresses of the insurgents fell to the royal troops in Bihar, Szolnok, Borsod and Kolozs counties. James Borsa left Adorján for Sólyomkő (now in Aleșd, Romania), where Charles built two nearby counter-castles in order to famish James Borsa without siege.

A royal charter from 1324 mentioned the returning Mojs' troops clashed with Fonói's army near Csicsó Castle (Romanian: Cetatea Ciceu) in Szolnok County for the first time, then at an unidentified village, Gyalu or Gyeke in Kolozs County (today Gilău and Geaca, respectively). Mojs was victorious both times, as a result Fonói withdrew from the province. After that, Mojs gathered his army and successfully besieged Valkó Castle, capturing and torturing its royal castellan Kenéz Geszti. Due to the successful siege, Mojs acquired most of the landholdings in Kraszna County. (according to Attila Zsoldos, this event occurred right before Mojs' return to Transylvania from Tiszántúl). Thereafter, he left Transylvania to provide assistance to James Borsa. The arriving Mojs tried to break the blockade at Sólyomkő (in late 1317 or early 1318). Though he managed to torch one of the counter-castles and imprisoned its castellan Stephen Gutkeled, but failed to free his father-in-law. James Borsa was captured by the royal troops after his surrender (possibly in May 1318), but escaped execution and was eventually ransomed by Mojs. The Borsas lost all political influence after 1317, and Mojs Ákos remained the most ardent and militarily the most successful enemy of Charles. Thus one of the staunchest supporters of the King, Dózsa Debreceni, who successfully waged war against the oligarchs in the previous years, was appointed Voivode of Transylvania in the summer of 1318.

In July 1318, Dózsa Debreceni launched his Northern Transylvanian campaign against Mojs. At Zilah (today Zalău, Romania), he summoned the Transylvanian noblemen to join his army and ordered the postponements of all incumbent lawsuits in the province. Mojs and his militia tried to prevent Debreceni to advance into the inner parts at Topa, midway between the Meszes Gate and Kolozsvár (today Cluj-Napoca, Romania), but suffered a heavy defeat. His allies, who lost their powers by then, James Borsa and Peter, son of Petenye were also involved Mojs' army, in addition to Saxon auxiliary troops. After his defeat, Charles nominally confiscated Mojs' lands in Kolozs and Doboka counties, declaring him "disloyal". The King considered the skirmish at Topa as "even greater victory" than the Borsas' defeat in his August 1318 charter. Finally, in early 1320, Mojs and his brother Ellős were killed in a battle at Bonchida (today Bonțida, Romania) by a royal army led by Stephen Losonci, a former Count of the Székelys. Charles I wrote in his donation letter in March 1320 that the "infidel" and "notorious" Ákos brothers were "miserably perished". Although the contemporary documents clearly referred to Losonci as the commander of the victorious royal army, Charles personally thanked Debreceni for the victory, when he and his escort visited Debrecen in May 1320. Charles still even praised Mojs' fall and death in 1329. However peace has not arrived to Transylvania yet, as the Kán sons were a serious threat to the royal power through the continuous looting and raids until the end of the 1320s.

While Pál Engel distinguished three campaigns against Mojs, took place in 1317, 1318 and 1320, Gyula Kristó considered the above mentioned battles as parts of a single royal campaign in 1318 led by Dózsa Debreceni. He argued, both John Fonói and Stephen Losonci served as lieutenants of Debreceni during that war, while commanded their armies. Attila Zsoldos rejected Kristó's theory as Ellős was mentioned as a living person in March 1319, when Thomas Losonci (brother of Stephen) forbade him to hand over his estate of Bonyha (today Bahnea, Romania) to his relative Nicholas Ákos, castellan of Kecskés. Instead, Zsoldos argued that Mojs had no castles which must be protected, and he could move his army more flexibly and faster across the province, even after his heavy defeat at Topa, and Bonchida only proved to be decisive, because Mojs was killed in the battlefield. Historian Attila Bárány represented another extreme point of view, as he considered that Dózsa Debreceni resided in Transylvania to make a decisive victory over Mojs throughout in 1319, as he had no judgments and stayed away from his seat Debrecen from December 1318 to March 1320, when a permanent campaign happened against the rebellious Mojs. However Attila Zsoldos emphasized the Transylvanian Chapter functioned continuously throughout the year, in addition to courts and places of authentication, which proves there was peace in the province in 1319. He argued, Mojs lost his influence and sense of initiative after Battle of Topa, and after months of chase, Losonci's small unit put an end to his insurgency at Bonchida.

== In historiography ==
Until the last decade of the 19th-century historiography, researchers like Vince Bunyitay and András Komáromy incorrectly claimed that Mojs Ákos (as he had namesake father) was the son of the powerful baron Mojs II, Palatine of Hungary, despite the fact that he had died without male heirs according to his last will and testament in 1280. Mór Wertner was the first historian, who identified Mojs' father (Mojs I) and grandfather (Albert, Ban of Severin) in 1909, but without the determination of his kindred, which was first stated by László Makkai in 1944, but this was rejected by the notable and prestigious genealogist János Karácsonyi, which delayed the recognition of the correctness of Makkai's finding.

According to Gyula Kristó, Mojs Ákos became a serious aspirant to become a so-called "provincial lord", who "cleverly exploited that political vacuum, which was emerged in Transylvania and the surrounding areas after the death of Ladislaus Kán". While Charles tried to annihilate Kán dominion between the Tisza river and Transylvania, Mojs established his "petty kingdom" at Northern Transylvania. Pál Engel claimed Görgény Castle (today Gurghiu in Romania) possibly functioned as the provincial seat of Mojs' territory, as Attila Bárány also shared this view. In royal documents after the Borsas' fall, Mojs appeared as the most dangerous enemy of Charles in Transylvania, who was mentioned in the first place in such formula like "Mojs and his accomplices", overshadowing his father-in-law and kinship, in addition to the Káns and other members of the Ákos clan. Bárány called Mojs as the "strongman" of the insurgents, despite James Borsa was released from captivity.

In contrary to other opinions, Attila Zsoldos, who analyzed Mojs' character in his 2017 study, highlighted that he exclusively faced the royal armies in open battles during that period when castle sieges were much more prevalent, because, rejecting Engel's hypothesis in connection to Görgény, which first appeared in contemporary sources only since 1358, Mojs did not own any castles, which was "the primary condition for becoming an oligarch". Thus Mojs was unable to strictly control a region (domain), but it provided him an unusual flexibility in his clashes. Zsoldos also argued Mojs always faced Charles together with his father-in-law James Borsa. He did not support the Káns' aspiration, captured Valkó and handed over it to his relative Beke Borsa, tried to free James Borsa, thus he cannot be considered an oligarch. His presence in Transylvania meant that the Borsa clan succeeded to keep a part of their influence in the region even after the late Roland Borsa had to resign as Voivode of Transylvania in favour of Ladislaus Kán decades earlier.

== Sources ==
- Bárány, Attila (2011). "Debreceni Dózsa küzdelme a bihari oligarchákkal [Dózsa Debreceni's Struggle with Oligarchs in Bihar]". In Bárány, Attila; Papp, Klára; Szálkai, Tamás (eds.). Debrecen város 650 éves. Várostörténeti tanulmányok (in Hungarian). Debreceni Egyetem. Történelmi Intézet. pp. 75–126. ISBN 978-963-821-6465.
- Engel, Pál (1988). "Az ország újraegyesítése. I. Károly küzdelmei az oligarchák ellen (1310–1323) [Reunification of the Realm. The Struggles of Charles I Against the Oligarchs (1310–1323)]". Századok (in Hungarian). 122 (1–2). Magyar Történelmi Társulat: 89–146. ISSN 0039-8098.
- Engel, Pál (1996). Magyarország világi archontológiája, 1301–1457, I. [Secular Archontology of Hungary, 1301–1457, Volume I] (in Hungarian). História, MTA Történettudományi Intézete. ISBN 963-8312-44-0.
- Kristó, Gyula (2003). "I. Károly király harcai a tartományurak ellen (1310–1323) [The Struggles of Charles I Against the Oligarchs (1310–1323)]". Századok (in Hungarian). 137 (2). Magyar Történelmi Társulat: 297–347. ISSN 0039-8098.
- Zsoldos, Attila (2016). "Erdélyi háborúk a 14. század elején [Transylvanian Wars at the Beginning of the 14th Century]". In Pósán, László; Veszprémy, László (eds.). Elfeledett háborúk. Középkori csaták és várostromok (6–16. század) (in Hungarian). Zrínyi Kiadó. pp. 198–231. ISBN 978-963-3276-96-9.
- Zsoldos, Attila (2017). "Az erdélyi lázadó: Ákos nembéli Mojs [The Insurgent from Transylvania: Mojs of Ákos Kindred]". In Egyed, Emese; Gálfi, Emőke; Weisz, Attila (eds.). CERTAMEN IV. Előadások a Magyar Tudomány Napján az Erdélyi Múzeum–Egyesület I. Szakosztályában (in Hungarian). Erdélyi Múzeum Egyesület. pp. 233–240. doi:10.51384/cert-04.17. ISSN 2393-4328.

Mojs II Genus Ákos Born: ? Died: early 1320
Political offices
Preceded by Nicholas Rátót (?)	Master of the cupbearers 1313–1314	Succeeded by Gregory Domoszlói
