= Nicholas II Kőszegi =

Nicholas (II) Kőszegi
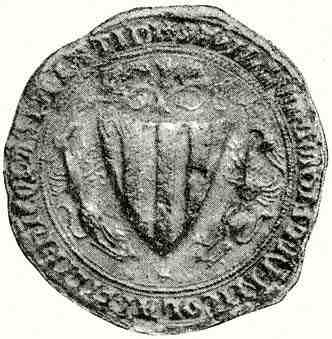
- Seal of Nicholas II Kőszegi, 1323

Master of the horse
- Reign: 1318–1321
- Predecessor: Peter Csák
- Successor: Blaise Fonyi
- Born: before 1299
- Died: 1332 or 1333
- Noble family: House of Kőszegi
- Spouse: Elizabeth von Pottendorf
- Issue: John I Rohonci; Ladislaus I Rohonci; Henry Rohonci; Catherine Rohonci
- Father: Nicholas I

Nicholas (II) Kőszegi, also known as Nicholas the Rooster (Hungarian: Kőszegi "Kakas" Miklós; died 1332 or 1333), was a Hungarian lord in the early 14th century, who served as Master of the horse from 1318 until 1321.

== Background ==
Nicholas II was born into the senior branch of the powerful and influential Kőszegi family, as the son of Nicholas I. According to genealogist Pál Engel, he had a younger brother John. The exact date of Nicholas' birth is unknown. He was born definitely before 1299, as his father died in that year. Nicholas II frequently appeared in contemporary documents with the nickname "the Rooster".

After the death of his father, Nicholas inherited several domains and villages in Western Transdaubia, especially in Vas and Zala counties. After 1299, he owned the castles of Kanizsa, Szentvid, Léka (present-day Lockenhaus, Austria), Rohonc (present-day Rechnitz in Austria) and Pölöske. The latter fort functioned as his permanent residence. Albeit, he was considered a prominent lord in the region, his wealth and influence were far behind his uncles, Ivan and Henry II, who had established oligarchic provinces independently of the monarch at the turn of the 13th and 14th centuries, which significantly restricted Nicholas' expansion potential. This probably created serious contrasts between the branches of the Kőszegis. In 1309 and 1312, when there was cooperation between the family members during a political resolution, Nicholas, who had reached adulthood by then, was omitted from the documents.

== Career ==
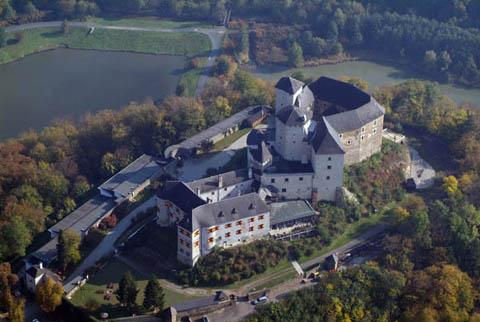
Burg Lockenhaus (Léka), owned by Nicholas Kőszegi and his sons until 1340

Nicholas was first mentioned by contemporary records in March 1314, when he and Ivan's grandson Andrew returned the previously seized Sobor to their familiares, the members of the gens (clan) Osl, including Lawrence. In the autumn of 1315, Charles I launched his first large-scale campaign against Nicholas' cousins, John and Peter (Henry II's sons) and their territory. Charles personally led his troops into Tolna County. However John sought assistance from his relatives, Andrew, who administered Western Transdanubia and Nicholas II; they represented the other two branches of the Kőszegi family. The united Kőszegi troops managed to expel the royal army from the region. In February 1316, Nicholas issued a letter of donation to his familiaris, Stephen Vönöcki for his loyalty and role in the victorious campaign against the royal troops.

There was a political turnaround in Nicholas' career in the upcoming months. When Stefan Uroš II Milutin invaded the Syrmia, Charles I launched a counter-campaign across the river Száva and seized the fortress of Macsó (present-day Mačva, Serbia) in the winter of 1317. Nicholas pledged allegiance to the king and also participated in the campaign, according to Pál Engel. Taking advantage of the king's absent, Andrew Kőszegi attacked the royalist towns of Sopron and Győr and, simultaneously, he unsuccessfully besieged Léka and Rohonc too, the castles of Nicholas II. During the attack, Andrew's troops killed Nicholas' several servants and pillaged their lands, but Nicholas' familiares, Gregory and Duruslaus Rumi managed to repel the invasion itself. In retaliation, Charles launched a punitive expedition against Andrew's territory in the summer of 1317, while Austrian duke Frederick the Fair also attacked from the borderlands. Andrew's dominion collapsed within months. Charles' cease-fire conditions resulted the dissolution of the extended Kőszegi province in Western Transdanubia. Charles I supported Nicholas, implementing the strategy of "divide and rule" in order to eliminate the Kőszegis' united actions; the king appointed him as ispán of Vas and Zala counties, succeeding Andrew. Beside that Nicholas was also made Master of the horse in late 1317 or early 1318.

After his ultimate victory over most of the oligarchs, including the Kőszegi kinship, Charles I turned against Nicholas and declared him as treacherous. In early 1321, Charles' generals, Alexander Köcski and Lawrence Csornai (Nicholas' former familiaris) again led a royal campaign in Transdanubia. At first, they captured Pölöske, then seized Kanizsa and Rohonc, along with several villages. Nicholas Kőszegi could retain only Léka, while the ispánate of Vas County went to his former rebellious relative, Andrew Kőszegi.

== Later life ==
Nicholas survived his political downfall. He successfully recovered the castle of Rohonc from the original owners, the Ják kindred during an act of land exchange in 1329. Nicholas married Elizabeth, a daughter of an Austrian noble, Konrad von Pottendorf. The marriage produced three sons, John, Ladislaus and Henry who took the Rohonci surname in the upcoming decades after their father' new permanent seat. He also had a daughter, Catherine. Nicholas made his last will in October 1332. He donated the land of Kedhely (present-day Rábakethely, a borough of Szentgotthárd) to the monastery in Borsmonostor (Klostermarienberg, today part of Mannersdorf an der Rabnitz, Austria). He died sometime before August 1333. His sons were forced to exchange the fort of Léka to Kemend in 1340. The Rohonci family flourished until 1403, when they lost much of their fortune, including Rohonc and Kemend, during the national uprising against King Sigismund. The kinship continued to exist until the middle of the 15th century.

== Sources ==
- Engel, Pál (1988). "Az ország újraegyesítése. I. Károly küzdelmei az oligarchák ellen (1310–1323) [Reunification of the Realm. The Struggles of Charles I Against the Oligarchs (1310–1323)]". Századok (in Hungarian). 122 (1–2). Magyar Történelmi Társulat: 89–146. ISSN 0039-8098.
- Engel, Pál (1996). Magyarország világi archontológiája, 1301–1457, I [Secular Archontology of Hungary, 1301–1457, Volume I] (in Hungarian). História, MTA Történettudományi Intézete. ISBN 963-8312-44-0.
- Kristó, Gyula (2003). "I. Károly király harcai a tartományurak ellen (1310–1323) [The Struggles of Charles I Against the Oligarchs (1310–1323)]". Századok (in Hungarian). 137 (2). Magyar Történelmi Társulat: 297–347. ISSN 0039-8098.
- Zsoldos, Attila (2010). "A Henrik-fiak: A Héder nembéli Kőszegiek "családi története" [The Henry Sons: The "Family History" of the Kőszegis from the Kindred Héder]". Vasi Szemle (in Hungarian). 64 (6): 651–661. ISSN 0505-0332.

Nicholas II House of Kőszegi Born: before 1299 Died: 1332/33
Political offices
Preceded by Peter Csák	Master of the horse 1318–1321	Succeeded by Blaise Fonyi
