= Peter III Csák =

Peter (III) Csák

Master of the horse
- Reign: 1314–1317
- Predecessor: John Kőszegi
- Successor: Nicholas Kőszegi
- Died: before 1350
- Noble family: gens Csák
- Issue: Ladislaus; Peter IV; Dominic
- Father: Stephen II

Peter (III) from the kindred Csák (Hungarian: Csák nembeli (III.) Péter; d. before 1350) was a Hungarian noble, who served as master of the horse between 1314 and 1317. He was the ancestor of the Dombai noble family.

== Biography ==
He was born into the Trencsén branch of the gens Csák as the second son of Stephen II. He had three siblings: Mark II, Stephen III and a sister, who married Roland III Rátót, son of palatine Roland II Rátót. Peter III had three sons: Ladislaus, Peter IV and Dominic, who took the Dombai surname.

After the death of their father, Peter and his brother, Mark II attended the second coronation of Charles I on 15 June 1309, continuing Stephen's political orientation. According to a royal charter in 1326, Charles I retook Csókakő (Fejér County), Bátorkő, Csesznek (Veszprém County) and Gesztes (Komárom County) castles and the belonging approximately 40 villages from Peter III and Stephen III. The king donated Dombó and Nyék (Tolna County) to the Csák clan as compensation. The Dombai family ascended from here.

== Sources ==
- (in Hungarian) Engel, Pál (1996). Magyarország világi archontológiája, 1301–1457, I. ("Secular Archontology of Hungary, 1301–1457, Volume I"). História, MTA Történettudományi Intézete. Budapest. ISBN 963-8312-44-0
- (in Hungarian) Kristó, Gyula (1986). Csák Máté ("Matthew Csák"). Magyar História, Gondolat. Budapest. ISBN 963-281-736-2

Peter III Genus Csák Born: ? Died: before 1350
Political offices
| Preceded by John Kőszegi | Master of the horse 1314–1317 | Succeeded by Nicholas Kőszegi |
