= Ladislaus Kanizsai =

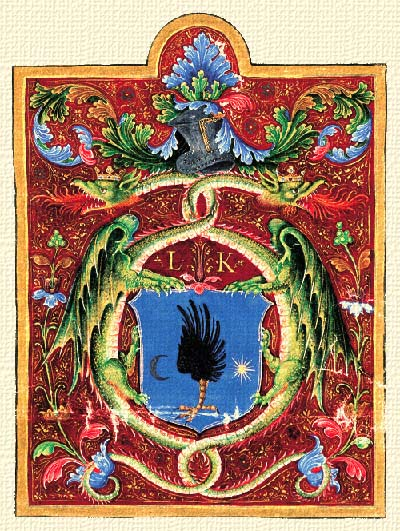
Coat of arms of Kanizsai family.

Ladislaus Kanizsai (Hungarian: Kanizsai László, died 1477/78), was a military commander and officer of state in the Kingdom of Hungary in the 15th century.

== Biography ==
Ladislaus was the son of Ladislaus Kanizsai, count of Sopron and Dorothea Garai, daughter of Nicholas II Garai, Palatine of Hungary.

In 1456, he took part in the famous and victorious siege of Belgrade, which was an engagement between the forces of the Western Christianity and the Ottoman Empire, along with John Hunyadi, Regent of Hungary.

In 1459, he held the office of Voivode of Transylvania.

Baron of the Hungarian Kingdom (Latin: barones regni) with the title of Magnificus vir, he was later appointed as Master of the horse between 1464 and 1467 (Latin: agasonum regalium magister, Hungarian: Lovászmester).

== Bibliography ==
- Engel, Pál (2001). The Realm of St Stephen: A History of Medieval Hungary, 895–1526. I.B. Tauris Publishers. ISBN 1-86064-061-3.
- Fallenbüchl, Zoltán (1988). Magyarország főméltóságai ("High Dignitaries in Hungary") (in Hungarian). Maecenas Könyvkiadó. ISBN 963-02-5536-7.
- Markó, László (2000). A magyar állam főméltóságai Szent Istvántól napjainkig: Életrajzi Lexikon ["Great Officers of State in Hungary from King Saint Stephen to Our Days: A Biographical Encyclopedia"] (in Hungarian). Magyar Könyvklub. ISBN 963-547-085-1.
