= Panyit Miskolc =

Hungarian lord and military leader

Ban of Severin
- Reign: 1270
- Predecessor: Lawrence, son of Kemény
- Successor: Lawrence, son of Kemény
- Died: 1273 or 1274
- Noble family: gens Miskolc
- Issue: Ladislaus; Nicholas; Paul II
- Father: Paul I

Panyit from the kindred Miskolc (Hungarian: Miskolc nembeli Panyit; died 1273 or 1274) was a Hungarian lord and military leader in the 13th century, a faithful confidant of Stephen V of Hungary. He served as Ban of Severin in 1270.

== Family and diplomatic missions ==
Panyit was born into the ancient gens (clan) Miskolc as the son of Paul I, whose parentage is unknown, thus his kinship relations to the branches of the clan is unknown. Panyit and his family possessed lands in Borsod County, but their branch was relatively not wealthy in comparison to the senior branches. They owned estates surrounding Miskolc, including Hejőcsaba (today a borough of Miskolc) until 1256, when Panyit handed over his portion to his distant relatives, the sons of Munkucs. He acquired the nearby village Bőcs in 1263. Panyit built a stone castle called Éleskő in the Bükk Mountains near Szilvásvárad by the early 1260s, which became the centre of his lordship.

When the Mongols invaded the Kingdom of Poland for the second time at the turn of 1259 and 1260, a second invasion of Hungary eleven years after the first catastrophic defeat became a real threat. King Béla IV of Hungary sent his envoy Panyit Miskolc to the court of Khan Berke in the spring of 1260 to successfully fend off the attack by diplomatic means. Three years later, in 1263, Panyit – now a member of the retinue of Duke Stephen – was again entrusted to travel to the Mongols after a brief looting raid along the southeastern border. During his visit, Khan Berke offered political alliance and marriage contract to Béla IV between their children, but the Hungarian monarch refused it upon the advice of Pope Alexander IV.

== Military service during the 1260s civil war ==
By the early 1260s, Béla's relationship with his oldest son and heir, Stephen, became tense, which caused a civil war lasting until 1266. After a brief conflict, Béla IV and his son divided the country and Stephen received the lands to the east of the Danube in 1262. Panyit became a partisan of the duke, possibly because the majority of his possessions laid in the territory of Stephen's realm. Panyit's long-time rival was Ernye Ákos, who also extended his influence in Borsod County in the previous decades and was considered a faithful supporter of Béla IV. The rivalry between the Ákos and Miskolc clans over the dominance in Borsod County characterized the second half of the 13th century. After the division of spheres of influence in the kingdom, Panyit tried to take advantage of the situation and acquired several lands in the county with the permission of Stephen. Ernye temporarily left his estates and his centre Dédes Castle and moved to Béla's realm to Transdanubia.

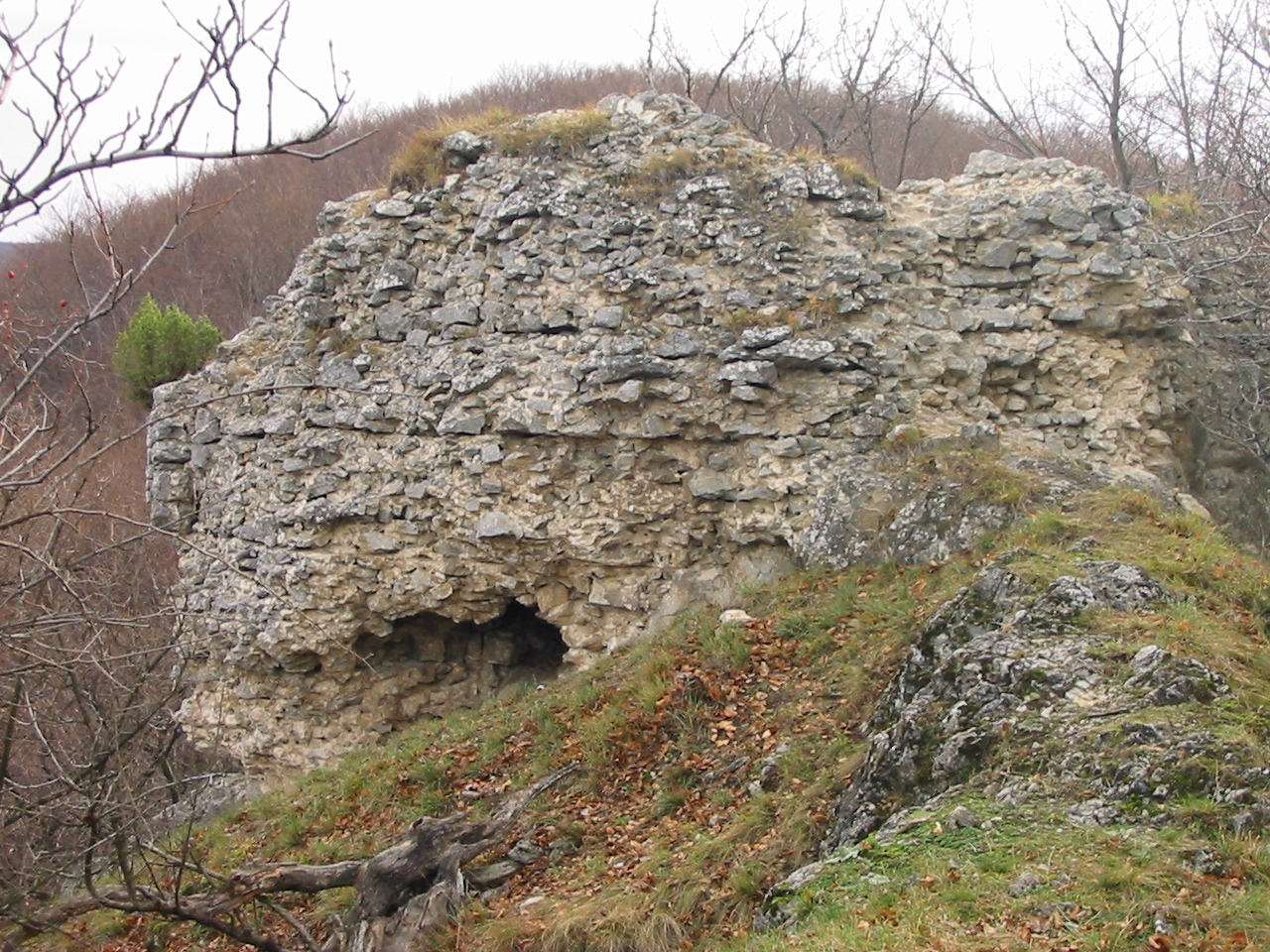
The ruins of Éleskő Castle near Szilvásvárad, erected by Panyit Miskolc

The reconciliation of Stephen and his father was only temporary. The junior king seized and confiscated the domains of his mother and sister, Anna, which were located in the lands under his rule. Béla IV's army crossed the Danube under Anna's command sometime after the autumn of 1264, which marked the beginning of the civil war between father and son. Simultaneously with the main army, a detachment of the royal army, under the command of Béla's Judge royal Lawrence, son of Kemény forced Duke Stephen to retreat as far as the fortress at Feketehalom (Codlea, Romania) in the easternmost corner of Transylvania. Based on two documents, historians Gyula Pauler and Jenő Szűcs argued Panyit Miskolc arrived at the protracted siege with a rescue army and relieved the castle. However, in fact, the rescue army was led by Peter Csák. The first document narrates that Panyit reconnoitered on the intentions of the besiegers and thus contributed to the victory, while the second says Panyit and some companions defeated the besiegers with "strength and cunning." Historian Attila Zsoldos argues Panyit was enlisted to the royal army by force during the early stage of civil war and he switched allegiance officially at the siege of Feketehalom. Because of the prolonged siege of Feketehalom (which, in fact, failed by then) royal general Henry Kőszegi sent Ernye Ákos with an army of Cuman warriors to Tiszántúl, in order to support the besiegers and, later, to hinder Duke Stephen's counter-offensive. The battle took place somewhere west of Várad (present-day Oradea, Romania) in February 1265. Ernye suffered a serious defeat and was himself captured by the enemy, Peter Csák's army. A document says that Ernye's rival Panyit Miskolc presented the fettered prisoner Ernye in the ducal court of Stephen following the battle. It is plausible that Panyit also participated in the Battle of Isaszeg in March 1265, where Stephen's army won a decisive victory over the royal army.

During the civil war in Hungary, Stephen's vassal, Despot Jacob Svetoslav submitted himself to Tsar Constantine Tikh of Bulgaria. In the summer of 1266, Stephen and Béla IV – who reconciled a few months earlier – jointly invaded Bulgaria, seized Vidin and other forts and routed the Bulgarians in five battles. Panyit participated in the war and was entrusted to lead an army which successfully besieged and occupied Pleven, according to a royal charter from 1270. For his loyal service, Panyit was installed as ispán of Doboka County by Duke Stephen sometime around 1268. In that year, he was granted portions of villages Mályi, Kistokaj and a fishpond called Filtó, which had laid between Szederkény and Kisfalud.

== Baron of the realm ==
Béla IV died in May 1270. His son Stephen V ascended the Hungarian throne without resistance within days. Panyit was made Ban of Severin in the summer of 1270, becoming one of the powerful barons of the realm. However, filling this post proved short-lived, because a lord, Nicholas Hahót rebelled against the king at the other end of the kingdom. He invited "German" (Styrian) knights into his seat, Pölöske, Zala County, and took an oath of allegiance to Ottokar II of Bohemia, long-time enemy of the Árpád dynasty. These soldiers continuously pillaged and ravaged the surrounding lands from the fort of Pölöske. Stephen V sent a royal army under the command of ispán Michael, son of Aladar to capture Pölöske and crush the rebellion. However the foreign mercenaries routed the Hungarian army, killing Michael too. Following that Panyit was appointed ispán of Zala County around late November 1270. Panyit led a military campaign against Nicholas Hahót and crushed his rebellion within weeks. Stephen V confiscated the lordships of Purbach and Pölöske from Nicholas Hahót and donated them to Panyit. Hahót's revolt its suppression resulted that, instead of peaceful conciliation, several lords, who possessed lands along the western border, including Henry Kőszegi, followed Duchess Anna into exile to Bohemia and handed their castles to Ottokar II.

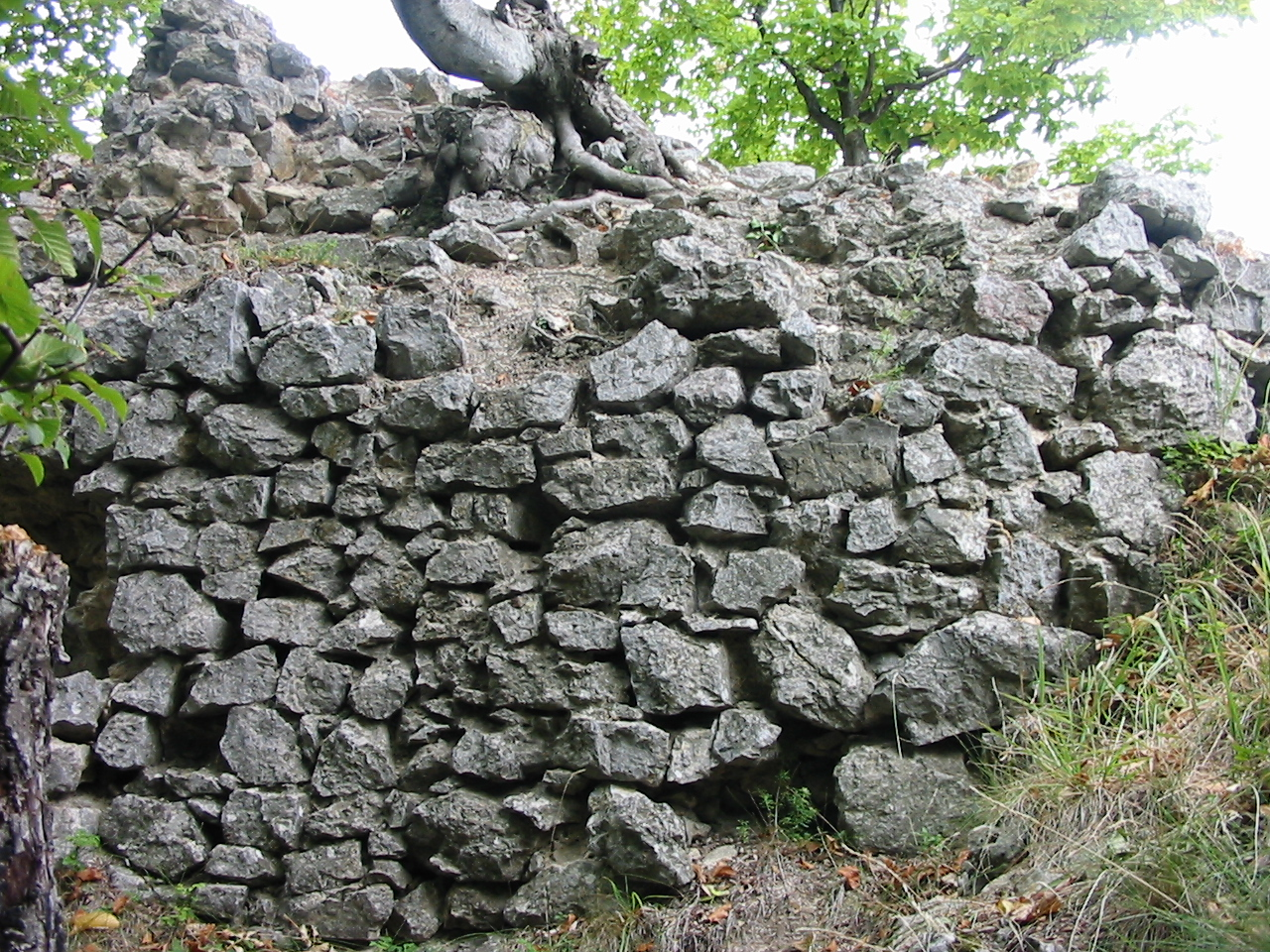
Remnants of the medieval wall of Éleskő Castle

With the title of ispán, Panyit became representative of the royal power in Zala County throughout from late 1270 to September 1272. He restored public order and suppressed minor uprisings instigated by Bohemian mercenaries along the border. Stephen V, who saw the power machinations and aspirations of Ottokar behind Hahót's revolt, launched a plundering raid into Austria around 21 December 1270. Panyit served as one of the commanders of the punitive expedition, along with Denis Péc and Ernye Ákos under general-in-chief Gregory Monoszló. They devastated the southeastern part of Styria and besieged Radkersburg, Fürstenfeld, Limbuh and Trasach, before returning home. It soon escalated into war by the spring of 1271, when Ottokar invaded the lands north of the Danube in April 1271 and captured a number of important fortresses in Upper Hungary. Panyit – with royal castellan Zsidó – successfully defended the fort of Purbach from the advancing Styrian troops. Panyit was present, when Stephen V and Ottokar II reached an agreement in Pressburg on 2 July 1271 after their brief war. In accordance with the treaty, common Austrian–Hungarian commissions were established to determine the borders and to resolve the disputes between the neighboring lords. As ispán of Zala County, Panyit (together with Gregory Monoszló who governed Vas County) took part in this process along the border with the Duchy of Styria, negotiating with the captains and notaries of the aforementioned province.

Stephen V died in August 1272, after his ten-year-old son and heir, Ladislaus was kidnapped, which marked the beginning of the era of "feudal anarchy". Panyit lost political influence after Stephen's death (while his rival Ernye Ákos recovered it). He was replaced as ispán of Zala County by Ivan Kőszegi in September 1272. Joachim Gutkeled and the returning Kőszegis took power over the royal council of the minor Ladislaus IV. Among other former rebellious lord, Nicholas Hahót was also pardoned. Panyit was forced to give back the castles of Purbach and Pölöske and the other confiscated assets to him at the turn of 1272 and 1273. As a compensation, Panyit received 82 servants who were relocated from Nick, Vas County to Borsod County by April 1273. In the royal court, Panyit had to satisfy with minor positions; he was referred to as head of Gacka (Gecske) źupa in the Kingdom of Croatia from November 1272 to April 1273.

== Legacy ==
Panyit died in 1273 or 1274. One of his sons, Ladislaus transcribed and confirmed the aforementioned transfer contract between his father and Nicholas Hahót in 1274, which implies his death by that time. Panyit had three sons – Ladislaus, Nicholas and Paul II – from his unidentified wife. They were involved in various clashes and lawsuits with the local powerful lord Stephen Ákos, who continued his father Ernye's policy and gradually extend his growing political influence over Borsod County and the surrounding areas. For instance, he seized the fishpond of Filtó from them. In 1281, he concluded an agreement with the three sons of the late Panyit, during which he returned the fishpond to them. The agreement of 1281 signed a compromise solution, when the boundary between the two spheres of interest was drawn along the river Sajó. Ladislaus was killed in the battle at Lake Hód (near present-day Hódmezővásárhely) in 1282. Nicholas was referred to as patron of the Benedictine Abbey of Tapolca in 1291. By the end of the 13th century, Panyit's branch became extinct; by then Stephen Ákos' possessions surrounded their lands around Miskolc and he elevated as one of the so-called "oligarchs", subjugating all noble families, including the Miskolc clan in the region.

== Sources ==
- Kis, Péter (1995). ""A király hű bárója" (Ákos nembeli Ernye pályafutása) ["The King's Loyal Baron: The Career of Ernye from the Kindred Ákos]". Fons. 2 (3). Szentpétery Imre Történettudományi Alapítvány: 273–316. ISSN 1217-8020.
- Rudolf, Veronika (2023). Közép-Európa a hosszú 13. században [Central Europe in the Long 13th Century] (in Hungarian). Arpadiana XV., Research Centre for the Humanities. ISBN 978-963-416-406-7.
- Szőcs, Tibor (2010). "Egy második "tatárjárás"? A tatár–magyar kapcsolatok a XIII. század második felében [A Second Tartar Invasion? The Tartar–Hungarian Relations in the Second Half of the 13th Century]". Belvedere Meridionale (in Hungarian). 22 (3–4): 16–49. ISSN 1419-0222.
- Szűcs, Jenő (2002). Az utolsó Árpádok [The Last Árpáds] (in Hungarian). Osiris Kiadó. ISBN 963-389-271-6.
- Zsoldos, Attila (2007). Családi ügy: IV. Béla és István ifjabb király viszálya az 1260-as években [A family affair: The Conflict between Béla IV and Junior King Stephen in the 1260s] (in Hungarian). História, MTA Történettudományi Intézete. ISBN 978-963-9627-15-4.
- Zsoldos, Attila (2011). Magyarország világi archontológiája, 1000–1301 [Secular Archontology of Hungary, 1000–1301] (in Hungarian). História, MTA Történettudományi Intézete. ISBN 978-963-9627-38-3.

Panyit Genus Miskolc Born: ? Died: 1273 or 1274
Political offices
| Preceded by Lawrence | Ban of Severin; 1270 | Succeeded by Lawrence |
