= Lawrence, son of Kemény =

Hungarian lord and military leader

Palatine of Hungary
- Reign: 1267–1270; 1272; 1273
- Predecessor: Henry Kőszegi (1st term); Mojs (2nd term); Roland Rátót (3rd term)
- Successor: Mojs (1st term); Roland Rátót (2nd & 3rd term)
- Died: after 1274
- Noble family: Matucsinai kinship
- Issue: Kemény II; Nicholas
- Father: Kemény I

Lawrence, son of Kemény (Hungarian: Kemény fia Lőrinc; died after 1274) was a prominent Hungarian noble and military leader of the 13th century. From the late 1250s onward, he held several offices within the royal court. He was a skilled and loyal soldier during the reign of Béla IV of Hungary. He retained his influence in the courts of Stephen V and Ladislaus IV too, representing a stable point in the government, when two baronial groups fought for the supreme power. Through his descendants, he became the forefather of the Cseményi and Matucsinai noble families.

== Family ==
Lawrence was born into a noble family, which possessed lands in southern Transdanubia, especially Baranya County. His father was Kemény (I), the first known member of the family. He served as ispán of Nyitra County from 1234 to 1235, during the last years of King Andrew II of Hungary. Historians Gyula Pauler and Jenő Szűcs considered Lawrence originated from the gens (clan) Szentemágócs. Lawrence had a brother Conrad.

Lawrence had two sons from his unidentified wife. Kemény (II) functioned as Master of the cupbearers in 1289 and ispán of Baranya County in the 1290s. He married an unidentified daughter of Nicholas Budmér, the Master of the stewards from 1251 to 1256. They were ancestors of the Cseményi family, which flourished until the early 15th century. Lawrence's second son was Nicholas, the progenitor of the Matucsinai family, which reached its peak by the second half of the 15th century, when Gabriel Matucsinai was elected Archbishop of Kalocsa in 1471. Because of their influence, Lawrence retrospectively was also referred to as Lawrence Matucsinai (Hungarian: Matucsinai Lőrinc) by later documents.

== Early career ==
[...] In this battle, where the horse of our most liked son-in-law, the prince /Rostislav/, who have already been mentioned several times, was killed, Master Lawrence, following steadily the passion of customary faithfulness and thinking more of the life of the above-mentioned prince than his own life, gave the horse he was riding to the prince mentioned above, and he flung himself at the thick lines of the enemy exposing himself to streams of perils, which have been proven to us by the narration of the above-mentioned prince and the reports of our many followers and other trustworthy men.

— King Béla’s Charter of 13 April 1264 to Lawrence, Judge of the Royal Court and Count of Moson

Lawrence raised in the royal court of Béla IV, where he served as a courtly knight. The king's charter, issued on 13 April 1264, narrates his early military career since the mid-1240s, thus Lawrence was presumably born in the early 1220s. Accordingly, he was a page, when participated in the second royal campaign against Daniil Romanovich in order to support the claim of Rostislav Mikhailovich, Béla's son-in-law, to the throne of the Principality of Halych. Lawrence was among the soldiers, when Rostislav – after a military failure in the previous year – recruited many Hungarians and Poles and launched an attack against Jarosław north of Przemyśl; on August 17, 1245, his uncle Daniil Romanovich, with Cuman help, annihilated the enemy, and Rostislav had to flee again to Hungary. During the battle, Lawrence was seriously injured when his lower shin was pierced by a spear, but he bravely fought – "disgusted by the darkness of sluggishness" – and captured a Galician baron, who was later beheaded. During their flee from the battlefield, Lawrence saved the life of Rostislav by handing over his full-strength horse.

In the upcoming years, Lawrence fought in the royal army in the war against Austria. He participated in the Battle of the Leitha River on 15 June 1246, where Frederick the Quarrelsome was killed. King Béla personally experienced and witnessed his boldness, according to his above-mentioned royal charter. He also took part in a campaign against Austria in 1250, when Béla made a plundering raid into Austria and Styria in the summer of 1250, in retaliation of a former Austrian incursion into Hungary. Lawrence was present during the sieges of Kirchschlag, Sparbach (Parduch) and Gerhaus (Grinhous; present-day a borough of Rohrau, Austria) in the period between 1250 and 1253, when Béla launched a campaign against Austria then Moravia.

Becoming one of the barons of the realm, Lawrence was installed as Master of the horse from 1258 to 1259. Beside that, he also served as ispán of Győr County in the same period. However, soon, he was given an important task at the opposite part of the realm. Rostislav Mikhailovich invaded Bulgaria with Hungarian assistance in 1259. In the following year, Rostislav left his duchy to join the campaign of his father-in-law, Béla IV against Bohemia. Taking advantage of Rostislav's absence, Bulgarian Emperor Konstantin Tih broke into his realm and reoccupied Vidin. He also sent an army to attack the Banate of Severin, but the arriving Hungarian commander, Lawrence, fought the invaders off. Lawrence ordered the hanging of several Bulgarian prisoners of war along the Danube. Lawrence, thus, did not participate in the Battle of Kressenbrunn which had taken place at the same time, and his contingent withdrew significant forces from the royal army. Following his victory, Lawrence restored Hungarian suzerainty over the Banate of Severin after a few years of Bulgarian influence. For his merits, Béla IV made him Ban of Severin in 1260.

== 1260s civil war ==
By 1260, tensions emerged between King Béla IV and his eldest son Stephen. Béla's favoritism towards his younger son, Béla (whom he appointed Duke of Slavonia) and daughter, Anna (Rostislav's widow) irritated Stephen, who was proved to be more skilled and capable military leader than his father. Their deteriorating relationship caused a civil war lasting until 1266. After a brief conflict, Béla IV and his son divided the country and Stephen received the lands to the east of the Danube in 1262, who also adopted the title of junior king. Lawrence was a strong pillar of Béla's elite, who made him Judge royal, the second most prestigious position in the royal court, in 1262. He served in this capacity until at least 1265. Beside that, he was also ispán of Zala County from 1262 to 1264 and ispán of Moson County in 1263 and 1264. It is presumable that Lawrence held these positions until early 1267. Because of his two decades of "virtue" and military service, Lawrence was granted lands in Baranya County by Béla IV in April 1264.

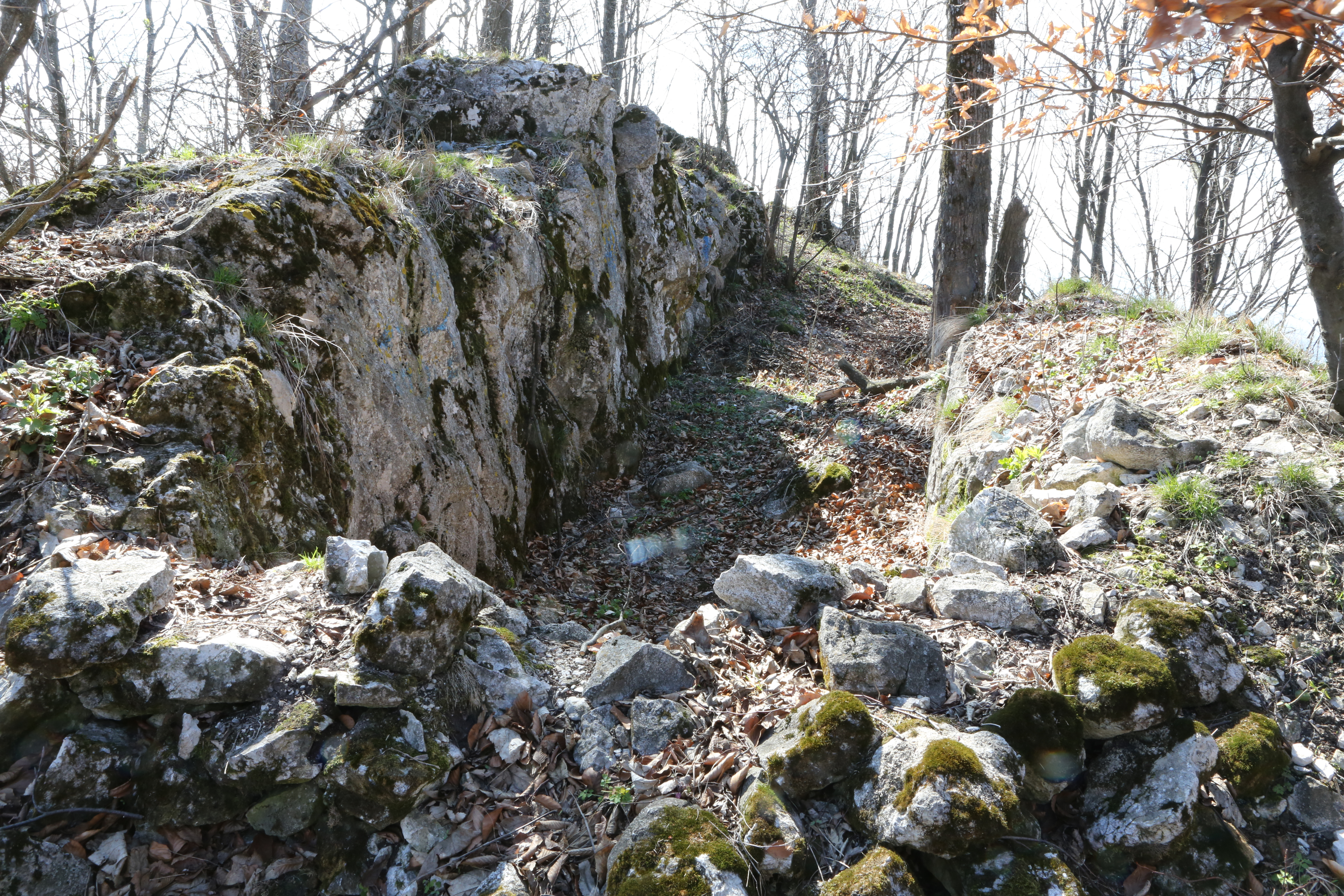
The ruins of Feketehalom (today Codlea, Romania), which was unsuccessfully besieged by Lawrence during the 1264–65 civil war

The reconciliation of Stephen and his father was only temporary. The junior king seized and confiscated the domains of his mother and sister, Anna, which were located in the lands under his rule. Béla IV's army crossed the Danube under Anna's command sometime after the autumn of 1264, which marked the beginning of the civil war between father and son. Simultaneously, a detachment of the royal army, under the command of Lawrence also marched into the eastern part of the kingdom. At first, he sent a vanguard of Cuman warriors led by brothers Ladislaus and Julius Kán, but their army was defeated by Duke Stephen at the fortress of Déva in late December 1264. Thereafter Lawrence's main army advanced into the duke's realm, and his soldiers forced Stephen to retreat as far as the castle at Feketehalom (Codlea, Romania) in the easternmost corner of Transylvania. Historian Attila Zsoldos argues Lawrence's military manoeuvre served as a diversion, because in the same time, the royal army led by Anna and Henry Kőszegi occupied Stephen's capital, the fort of Patak (ruin near Sátoraljaújhely) and captured the junior king's wife, Elizabeth the Cuman and children, including the future Ladislaus IV. Thereafter, Henry Kőszegi and his troops began to besiege and occupy Stephen's castles one after another in the eastern parts of Upper Hungary.

Meanwhile, Lawrence began to besiege the castle of Feketehalom with stone catapults. His brother Conrad was also present and led an army vanguard in order to attack the gate. The duke and his entourage soon exhausted the accumulated stock. Stephen intended to send a special envoy Demetrius Rosd to his parents in order to seek mercy, but the besiegers captured him and Lawrence tortured the prisoner. Zsoldos argues Lawrence definitely wanted to squeeze victory out on the battlefield. However, some nobles with the leadership of Panyit Miskolc, who were enlisted to the royal army by force during the early stage of civil war, switched allegiance and reconnoitered on the intentions of the besiegers, defeating them with "strength and cunning". Formerly, Pauler and Szűcs argued Panyit arrived at the protracted siege with a rescue army and relieved the castle. In fact, the arriving rescue army were led by Duke Stephen's main generals Peter and Matthew Csák, who returned from Upper Hungary. The battle took place at the wall of Feketehalom between the two armies, while Duke Stephen led his remaining garrison out of the fort. The royalist troops were heavily defeated, Lawrence himself was also captured along with his war flags and many of his soldiers. Andrew, son of Ivan, was the knight who lanced and speared Lawrence and three other generals (including the flag-bearer) during the battle. Because of the prolonged siege of Feketehalom (which, in fact, failed by then, around January 1265) Henry Kőszegi sent a skillful military general Ernye Ákos with an army of Cuman warriors to Tiszántúl, in order to support the besiegers and, later, to hinder Duke Stephen's counter-offensive. The battle took place somewhere west of Várad (present-day Oradea, Romania) in February 1265. Ernye suffered a serious defeat and was himself captured by the enemy, Peter Csák's army. Stephen launched a counter-offensive and forced his father's army to retreat. He gained a decisive victory over his father's army in the Battle of Isaszeg in March 1265, ending the brief civil war.

== Palatine of Hungary ==
Lawrence, along with other pro-Béla lords, was being held as prisoner and after the Battle of Isaszeg, Béla IV was forced to accept the authority of Stephen in the eastern parts of the kingdom. In late March 1265, Béla and Stephen concluded a peace treaty. As a result, Lawrence was released from captivity sometime after. Around September 1265, still holding the dignity of Judge royal, he already appeared as an arbiter during a lawsuit. On 23 March 1266, father and son confirmed the peace in the Convent of the Blessed Virgin on 'Rabbits' Island. Lawrence remained a strong partisan of Béla IV after the civil war. The king appointed him Palatine of Hungary in February 1267, replacing Henry Kőszegi. Plausibly, he held the dignity until Béla's death in 1270. Beside that he also functioned as ispán of Somogy County (1267–1270) and the castle district of Kemlék (1269–1270), which laid in the territory of Križevci County.

As a member of the royal court, Lawrence was present in Óbuda then Esztergom in late summer 1267, when Béla and Stephen together confirmed the liberties of the "royal servants", from then on known as noblemen, according to Jenő Szűcs. However, Attila Zsoldos considers, the king alone organized the meeting to Esztergom in September 1267, and was merely mobilization and preparation for a next war with his son Stephen. Lawrence, a participant of the meeting and co-judge beside Béla, was an advocate of the "war party", along with Henry Kőszegi, Ernye Ákos and Csák Hahót. However, as Zsoldos analyses, the mobilized royal servants were not enthusiastic about another internal war, instead they demanded the recognition of their rights and privileges from the monarch, and the name of the absent duke was included in the charter at their request.

Throughout the year 1268, Lawrence stayed in Somogy County, where he functioned as ispán, where acted as arbiter in a series of lawsuits, which reviewed the ownership of several possessions in the county. One of the articles of the Decree of 1267 ordained that "the lands of the nobles, which thou art ours, the peoples of the queen's free villages, or the courtiers, or the castle folks, are occupied or kept occupied under any pretext, must be returned to these nobles". The assembly of Somogy County delegated five local nobles – including John and Stephen Bő – to the ad-litem court chaired by Lawrence. According to a document from 1268, this court returned an estate Szentgyörgy to its original owners, deeming its acquisition by the queenly folks unlawful. By June 1269, Lawrence returned to the royal court, where judged over in lawsuits related to Pozsony County.

== Role in the feudal anarchy ==
Seeing the faithfulness and steadfast loyalty of our beloved follower Lawrence, Ban of Severin and Count of Doboka, and considering also that, when [...] some of his [Béla's] barons, wounded by the spear of infidelity, immediately after the glorious king [Béla] passed away, guided by evil, marched to the border and handed over the treasures of our realm to the ruler of Bohemia [Ottokar II] with tricks and stratagem, in contrast, Lawrence, then Palatine of the Realm, and Count of Somogy and Kemlék, [...] ahead of other barons and dignitaries of our realm, showed such obedience and devotion to our Majesty that he, by his own example, revealed and showed others the confidential path to our Majesty.

— King Stephen's Charter of 25 March 1271 to Lawrence, Ban of Severin and Count of Doboka

Béla IV died on 3 May 1270. After his death, Duchess Anna seized the royal treasury and fled to Bohemia. Stephen arrived to Buda within days. He nominated his own partisans to the highest offices; Lawrence was replaced as Palatine by Mojs. Despite that Lawrence reconciled with his former enemy, the new monarch. He attended the coronation of Stephen V and formally swore an oath of allegiance to the new monarch on 17 May. He escorted the new monarch to Cracow in the summer of 1270. There, Stephen reconciled with his brother-in-law, Duke Boleslaw the Chaste, who had supported the late Béla IV during the 1260s civil war. Lawrence was also present, when Stephen V met Ottokar II of Bohemia on an island of the Danube near Pressburg (present-day Bratislava, Slovakia), but they only concluded a truce. Lawrence was made Ban of Severin around August 1270. In the next month, he was temporarily succeeded by Panyit Miskolc, but after a rebellion broke out in Western Transdanubia against Stephen's rule, Panyit was transferred to the area and Lawrence was reinstalled as ban in late 1270. Beside that he also served as ispán of Doboka County from 1270 to 1272, throughout the reign of Stephen V.

Instead of peaceful conciliation, several lords, who possessed lands along the border, including Henry Kőszegi and his sons, Lawrence Aba and Nicholas Geregye, followed Duchess Anna into exile to Bohemia and handed their castles to Ottokar II, who placed the treasonous nobles under his protection. The Hungarian monarch, who saw the power machinations and aspirations of Ottokar behind the unrest in Western Hungary, launched a plundering raid into Austria around 21 December 1270. Lawrence, "already tired of the constant warfare", was entrusted to organize the defense of the country along the western border and was sent to the region as head of the vanguard, before Stephen launched his large-scale royal campaign. For his loyal service, Stephen V donated the castle of Vágújhely along the river Morava (Morva) in Nyitra County (present-day Nové Mesto nad Váhom, Slovakia) and its accessories in March 1271. The castle was formerly also owned by his father Kemény. Stephen's raid escalated into war by the spring of 1271, when Ottokar invaded the lands north of the Danube. Lawrence's possible role in the later stages of the war is unknown. He was among the Hungarian barons, who swore on the Peace of Pressburg in July 1271.

When Joachim Gutkeled kidnapped Stephen's heir, the 10-year-old Ladislaus in the summer of 1272, it marked the beginning of the era of "feudal anarchy". Stephen V, who unsuccessfully attempted to liberate his son, seriously fell ill. One of his last decisions was that he appointed Lawrence as Palatine on 3 August. The king died three days later, on 6 August. In the upcoming years, two baronial groups rivaled for the supreme power under the nominal reign of Dowager Queen Elizabeth the Cuman. The first alliance was dominated by Joachim Gutkeled and the returning Henry Kőszegi, while the second one was led by the Csák brothers. Historian Jenő Szűcs considered, the elderly respected and prestigious barons, who were made palatines and other chief officials, such Denis Péc, Ernye Ákos, Roland Rátót and Lawrence, were considered stable points and "beauty spot" in the fast-changing governments during the first five regnal years of Ladislaus. Lawrence held the dignity of Palatine until around November 1272, when he was replaced by Roland Rátót. After Stephen's death, Lawrence belonged to the favourites of Queen Elizabeth, whose person was both neglected by the two parties. When she temporarily regained her lost influence over the royal council due to Ottokar's invasion in the spring of 1273, Lawrence was appointed Palatine for the third time sometime around May 1273. Beside that he was also ispán of Sopron (1272–1273), Baranya and Orbász counties (1273). Under Elizabeth's influence, Lawrence was granted the castle of Újvár along the river Morva in Pozsony County (present-day Holíč, Slovakia) in March 1273, which fort was formerly possessed by his late father Kemény too. When the Kőszegi family and their allies deprived Elizabeth and his courtiers from the power in June 1273, Lawrence lost his positions – he was again replaced by Roland Rátót – and never regained his influence again. The royal council, in the name of Ladislaus IV, confiscated his estates, including Vágújhely, which returned to the property of the Pannonhalma Abbey. King Ladislaus forgave him, returning the confiscated possessions in January 1274. The document refers to him simply comes Lawrence, which reflects the permanent loss of his political influence. Lawrence was last mentioned as a living person here. He died sometime thereafter, definitely before 1280.

== Sources ==
- Fine, John V. A. (1994). The Late Medieval Balkans: A Critical Survey from the Late Twelfth Century to the Ottoman Conquest. The University of Michigan Press. ISBN 0-472-08260-4.
- Kristó, Gyula, ed. (2000). Középkori históriák oklevelekben (1002–1410) [Medieval Stories in Charters (1002–1410)] (in Hungarian). Szegedi Középkorász Műhely. ISBN 963-482-423-4.
- László, Balázs (2020). "Kemény fia Lőrinc és a királyi jog [Lawrence, son of Kemény and the Ius Regium]". Jogtörténeti Szemle (in Hungarian). 18 (4). Eötvös Loránd Tudományegyetem Magyar Állam- és Jogtörténeti Tanszék: 45–52. ISSN 0237-7284.
- Madgearu, Alexandru (2017). The Asanids: The Political and Military History of the Second Bulgarian Empire, 1185–1280. BRILL. ISBN 978-9-004-32501-2.
- Markó, László (2006). A magyar állam főméltóságai Szent Istvántól napjainkig: Életrajzi Lexikon [Great Officers of State in Hungary from King Saint Stephen to Our Days: A Biographical Encyclopedia] (in Hungarian). Helikon Kiadó. ISBN 963-208-970-7.
- Rudolf, Veronika (2023). Közép-Európa a hosszú 13. században [Central Europe in the Long 13th Century] (in Hungarian). Arpadiana XV., Research Centre for the Humanities. ISBN 978-963-416-406-7.
- Szőcs, Tibor (2014). A nádori intézmény korai története, 1000–1342 [An Early History of the Palatinal Institution: 1000–1342] (in Hungarian). Magyar Tudományos Akadémia Támogatott Kutatások Irodája. ISBN 978-963-508-697-9.
- Szűcs, Jenő (1984). "Az 1267. évi dekrétum és háttere. Szempontok a köznemesség kialakulásához [The Decree of 1267 and its Background. Aspects for the Formation of the Lower Nobility]". In H. Balázs, Éva; Fügedi, Erik; Maksay, Ferenc (eds.). Mályusz Elemér emlékkönyv. Társadalom- és művelődéstörténeti tanulmányok (in Hungarian). Akadémiai Kiadó. pp. 341–394. ISBN 963-05-3272-7.
- Szűcs, Jenő (2002). Az utolsó Árpádok [The Last Árpáds] (in Hungarian). Osiris Kiadó. ISBN 963-389-271-6.
- Zsoldos, Attila (2007). Családi ügy: IV. Béla és István ifjabb király viszálya az 1260-as években [A family affair: The Conflict between Béla IV and Junior King Stephen in the 1260s] (in Hungarian). História, MTA Történettudományi Intézete. ISBN 978-963-9627-15-4.
- Zsoldos, Attila (2011). Magyarország világi archontológiája, 1000–1301 [Secular Archontology of Hungary, 1000–1301] (in Hungarian). História, MTA Történettudományi Intézete. ISBN 978-963-9627-38-3.

Political offices
Preceded by Mojs	Master of the horse 1258–1259	Succeeded by Herrand Héder
Preceded by Stephen Csák (?)	Ban of Severin; 1260	Succeeded by Lawrence
Preceded by Henry Kőszegi	Judge royal 1262–1265	Succeeded by Ernye Ákos
Preceded by Henry Kőszegi	Palatine of Hungary; 1267–1270	Succeeded by Mojs
Preceded by Ugrin Csák	Ban of Severin; 1270	Succeeded by Panyit Miskolc
Preceded by Panyit Miskolc	Ban of Severin; 1270–1272	Succeeded by Albert Ákos
Preceded by Mojs	Palatine of Hungary; 1272	Succeeded by Roland Rátót
Preceded by Roland Rátót	Palatine of Hungary; 1273	Succeeded by Roland Rátót
