= Herrand Héder =

Hungarian nobleman

Master of the horse
- Reign: 1262–1270
- Predecessor: Lawrence, son of Kemény
- Successor: Albert Ákos
- Died: after 1276
- Noble family: gens Héder
- Issue: Dominic; James II; Nicholas I Elizabeth
- Father: Denis II

Herrand from the kindred Héder (Hungarian: Héder nembeli Herrand; died after 1276) was a Hungarian lord in the second half of the 13th century, who served as Master of the horse from 1262 to 1270.

== Career ==
Herrand was born into the Hédervár branch of the powerful gens (clan) Héder, as the son of Denis II. The kindred had originated from the Duchy of Swabia – Herrand's great-grandfather was Héder, the clan's namesake co-founder. Herrand had two brothers: Héder III served as ispán of Hont County in 1269. Denis III ("the White-headed") was the forefather of the prestigious Hédervári family.

Herrand spent his childhood in the royal court. Belonging to the courtiers of King Béla IV of Hungary, Herrand distinguished himself in the series of military campaigns against the Duchy of Austria by the beginning of the 1250s, when Béla decided to intervene in the war of succession between various claimants. Herrand participated in the plundering raid into Austria and Styria in the summer of 1250, in retaliation of a former Austrian incursion into Hungary. Herrand actively fought against the troops of Ottokar II of Bohemia in Styria and Moravia in 1252 and 1253, respectively. According to Béla's letter of donation a decade later, Herrand participated in the raid of Austria, and fought at the occupation of Kirchschlag and other castles in 1250. Two years later, in 1252, Herrand took part in the campaign against Styria. He defeated and killed the castellan of the fort Dobronuc (Hartberg) with a spear on the nearby battlefield, while he was seriously wounded too. In Moravia in 1253, Herrand was commissioned to guard and administer the castle of Peno. He successfully defended the fort against the advancing Bohemian troops during the war. For his faithful service, Herrand was granted Szentkút (present-day Stegersbach and Heiligenbrunn in Austria), Mérhart, Szombatfalva (today a borough of Strem in Austria), Újfalva and Pinka along the Austrian border by Béla IV in 1255, which villages were formerly possessed by his distant relative, Virunt (or Werenherth), who served as a canon of the cathedral chapter of Győr and died without descendants.

By August 1262, Herrand was installed as Master of the horse in the royal court (the last known predecessor Lawrence, son of Kemény held the dignity until 1259). Herrand served in this capacity for the remaining part of the reign of Béla IV, who died in May 1270. Beside that, he also functioned as ispán of Trencsén County until 1266 or 1267. During his first mention as Master of the horse, Herrand was granted the land Rajka and its accessories by the monarch; according to the royal charter, the landholding was formerly belonged to the ownership of Denis, Herrand's father, but it was confiscated due to his "certain violations" against the law. During the emerging conflict between Béla IV and his heir and eldest son Duke Stephen, Herrand supported the monarch but also tried to mediate between the parties and reconcile the king with his son. After a brief skirmish, the truce was secured in November 1262 with the intervention of Herrand and Ladislaus, the archdeacon of Hont, which was followed by the signing of the Peace of Pressburg. Despite that a large-scale civil war broke out between Béla IV and Stephen at the turn of 1264 and 1265; Herrand's possible involvement in the conflict is unknown, but the monarch donated him Oroszvár (present-day Rusovce, a borough of Bratislava, Slovakia) with its fortified manor and the privilege to hold regular fairs there in May 1266. Herrand served as ispán of Moson County at least from 1268 to 1269. Béla IV transcribed and confirmed his former donations with his golden seal to Herrand and his descendants in 1269. Today's Mesteri once was called Hernádmesteri (lit. "of Master Herrand") after Herrand.

Following the death of Béla IV and Stephen V's ascension to the Hungarian throne in May 1270, Herrand lost his courtly positions and political influence for years. From this period, he is mentioned only once in 1271, when his three servants from Boba in Vas County requested a confirmation of a donation letter of 1224 from the king. This data perhaps reflects Herrand's political independence from the aspirations of their distant relatives, the Kőszegi family, who dominated that county from that decade. During the 1271 Bohemian–Hungarian war, Ottokar's army besieged and demolished Oroszvár, Herrand's fort. He regained some influence only after the end of the first period of the so-called "feudal anarchy", when he was referred to as steward of the household of Queen consort Isabella, the spouse of King Ladislaus IV, in the period between December 1274 and March 1275. Beside that, he also functioned as ispán of Bars, Sempte (1274) and Zala counties (1275). Herrand was a partisan of the Csák baronial group, which gained influence over the royal council for the upcoming years during that time. Herrand's newly acquired positions projected his responsibility to protect the Hungarian borderlands against the invasions of Ottokar II from Bohemia and Austria in those turbulent years. He was granted the confiscated lands of the royal archers in Vas County in December 1274, because of their former alignment with the late Henry Kőszegi (otherwise Herrand's distant relative from the other branch of the Héder clan), a major enemy of the Csáks. By May 1275, Herrand became head (count) of the queenly household and ispán of Vas County, where a significant portion of his possessions had laid. He held the latter office until the next month. For his service, Herrand was granted the castle of Ságsomlyó and its accessories (Nagyság, Általság, Hőgyész and Kamnat) near present-day Celldömölk by Ladislaus IV in October 1275. At that time, he was styled as treasurer of the queenly household, while again served as ispán of Vas County from December 1275 to February 1276.

== Descendants ==
Herrand had three sons and a daughter. Dominic was mentioned in 1268 and 1269, when he was granted the village Enese near Moson Castle by Béla IV because of his father's undisclosed military merits. James II handed his lands in Moson County – Oroszvár, Szerdahely (present-day Rusovce and Dunajská Streda in Slovakia, respectively), Csütörtökhely and Rajka, over to King Andrew III in 1297, in exchange for Monyorókerék (today Eberau in Austria). His new seat laid near the lordship of Németújvár (Güssing). James' son John and grandson Stephen died without descendants sometime before 1371. Herrand's third son, Nicholas I died in 1326; he donated Bekény (near Egyházashetye) to Peter Intai in his last will and testament. Herrand's only daughter, Elizabeth married to Gregory Rumi from the Tengerdi kinship.

== Sources ==
- Karácsonyi, János (1901). A magyar nemzetségek a XIV. század közepéig. II. kötet [The Hungarian genera until the middle of the 14th century, Vol. 2] (in Hungarian). Hungarian Academy of Sciences.
- Kristó, Gyula, ed. (2000). Középkori históriák oklevelekben (1002–1410) [Medieval Stories in Charters (1002–1410)] (in Hungarian). Szegedi Középkorász Műhely. ISBN 963-482-423-4.
- Sălăgean, Tudor (2016). Transylvania in the Second Half of the Thirteenth Century: The Rise of the Congregational System. East Central and Eastern Europe in the Middle Ages 450–1450. Vol. 37. Leiden and Boston: Brill. ISBN 978-90-04-24362-0.
- Varga, Virág (2023). "A Héder nembeli Héderváriak társadalmi helyzete a 13–14. század fordulóján [The Social Status of the Hédervári Family of the Héder genus at the Turn of the 13–14th Centuries]". In Hunyadi, Sándor; et al. (eds.). Micae Mediaevales XII (in Hungarian). Eötvös Loránd University. pp. 133–155. ISSN 2062-2198.
- Zsoldos, Attila (2011). Magyarország világi archontológiája, 1000–1301 [Secular Archontology of Hungary, 1000–1301] (in Hungarian). História, MTA Történettudományi Intézete. ISBN 978-963-9627-38-3.

Herrand Genus Héder Born: ? Died: after 1276
Political offices
Preceded by Lawrence	Master of the horse 1262–1270	Succeeded by Albert Ákos
