= Albert Ákos =

Hungarian nobleman

Ban of Severin
- Reign: 1272
- Predecessor: Lawrence, son of Kemény
- Successor: Paul Gutkeled
- Died: after 1276
- Noble family: gens Ákos
- Issue: Mojs I John; Ákos
- Father: Erdő I

Albert from the kindred Ákos, also known as Albert the Great (Hungarian: Ákos nembeli (Nagy) Albert; died after 1276), was a Hungarian lord in the second half of the 13th century, who served as master of the horse from 1270 to 1272, then briefly Ban of Severin in 1272.

== Family ==
Albert was the son of Erdő I, part of into the Ernye branch of the gens (clan) Ákos. Albert's elder brother was the powerful lord Ernye, by whose service this branch of the extended gens rose to become one of the richest and most influential elite families by the end of the century. Albert's nephew, Stephen, is regarded as the most powerful member of the kindred. Ernye and Albert also had a younger brother, Erdő II, who served as ispán of Tolna (1272) and Trencsén Counties (1274). Albert's belonging to the kindred was first identified by Hungarian historian László Makkai.

Albert had at least three children from his unidentified wife; Mojs I was considered a partisan of Andrew III of Hungary in the 1290s, while the younger sons, John and Ákos, were both mentioned only once in 1278. Albert's grandson, Mojs II was a rebellious lord in the early 14th century, who made an alliance with oligarch James Borsa and the sons of the late Ladislaus Kán in 1315 and caused a rebellion against Charles I of Hungary.

== Career ==
The careers of both Albert and Erdő II were overshadowed by their elder brother Ernye's illustrious military and political activity during the reign of Béla IV of Hungary. As they first appeared in court positions about two decades after their brother's first appearance in this capacity, Romanian historian Sorin Forțiu considered Albert and Erdő II were significantly younger than Ernye and possibly they were born from their father's subsequent second marriage.

After the death of king Béla IV and Stephen V's accession to the Hungarian throne in 1270, Ernye did not lose his political influence despite the earlier conflicts with the new monarch. While Ernye remained without a prominent dignity for more than two years, Albert served as Master of the horse from 1270 to 1272, for almost the entire duration of Stephen's reign. Beside that, he also functioned as ispán of Szeben County. Both Ernye and Albert took part in the royal campaign against Ottokar II of Bohemia, which lasted from December 1270 to the spring of 1271. Albert was among those barons, who swore to the agreement in Pressburg, which was concluded between Stephen V and Ottokar II on 2 July 1271.

When Joachim Gutkeled kidnapped Stephen's heir, the 10-year-old Ladislaus in the summer of 1272, the monarch, who seriously fell ill after his failed attempts to liberate his son, decided to reorganize the government structure. Around 3 August, Albert was appointed Ban of Severin, indicating that he was a loyal supporter of the ailing monarch. However, Stephen V died within days, on 6 August 1272. The minor Ladislaus IV was crowned king of Hungary within weeks. In the upcoming years, two baronial groups rivaled for the supreme power under the nominal reign of Dowager Queen Elizabeth the Cuman. Albert was replaced as Ban of Severin by Paul Gutkeled sometime before 11 September 1272. Thereafter, Albert disappears from contemporary sources, although a non-authentic charter refers to him as Ban of Macsó in 1275.

Sorin Forțiu considered, Albert's career ended abruptly because of his ill of leprosy, while Ernye remained a member of the elite for the remaining part of his life. The legend of Saint Margaret of Hungary narrates that a certain "serf", Albert, the ban of "Csicsét" or "Kicsed", who, being ill with leprosy, miraculously healed himself overnight after being advised to visit the tomb of St. Margaret, as this Albert testified during the canonization process of Margaret in 1276. According to historian Mór Wertner in his study (1900), the legend also narrates this Albert was the second husband of Anna of Hungary, Duchess of Macsó. Observing mistranslations and the misinterpretations in the various versions of the legend, Wertner considered the original text was Ban Albert of "Chychety", which indicates a place of origin or residence, instead of a title of dignity. Refusing this, Sándorhegyi (plausibly a pseudonym of historian János Karácsonyi) argued Albert was the subject of Duchess Anna, and not her husband ("asszony" means a mistress here, instead of wife), consequently he belonged to her court after the death of Stephen V. He also claimed "Chychety" is identical with the dignity of Ban of Kucsó or Severin (Cheurin). Two years later (1902) "Sándorhegyi" also considered that Duchess Anna returned to Hungary in 1274, and was given back the territory of the former Duchy of Macsó until her death around 1278. Based on the aforementioned non-authentic charter from 1275, he claimed that Albert indeed held dignity of Ban of Macsó during his testament. The two witnesses, alongside Duchess Anna, who were present during this act – Nicholas, provost of Syrmia and a certain Ampud, Ban of "Bocsina" (Bosnia?) – were also attached to Southern Hungary beyond the Drava river, thus they also belonged to Duchess Anna's household. Sorin Forțiu accepted the identification and considered Albert Ákos served as Ban of Kucsó sometime between 1273 and 1279, and/or retaining his honorary title of Ban of Severin after his brief office-holding.

== Sources ==
- Forțiu, Sorin (2021). "Banologia (XI): Alberto [Magno] bano de Zeurino (1272) [Banologia (XI): Albert [the Great], Ban of Severin (1272)]". Morisena (in Romanian). 6 (1). Asociației Culturale Concordia Cenad: 5–17. ISSN 2501-1359.
- Sándorhegyi (1900). "Kicsedi Albert bán [Ban Albert of Kicsed]". Századok (in Hungarian). 34 (10). Magyar Történelmi Társulat: 949. ISSN 0039-8098.
- Sándorhegyi (1902). "Albert a "chycheti" bán [Albert, the Ban of "Chychet"]". Századok (in Hungarian). 36 (7). Magyar Történelmi Társulat: 678–681. ISSN 0039-8098.
- Wertner, Mór (1900). "Kicsedi Albert bán [Ban Albert of Kicsed]". Századok (in Hungarian). 34 (9). Magyar Történelmi Társulat: 771–777. ISSN 0039-8098.
- Zsoldos, Attila (2011). Magyarország világi archontológiája, 1000–1301 [Secular Archontology of Hungary, 1000–1301] (in Hungarian). História, MTA Történettudományi Intézete. ISBN 978-963-9627-38-3.

Albert Genus Ákos Born: ? Died: after 1276
Political offices
Preceded by Herrand Héder	Master of the horse 1270–1272	Succeeded by Nicholas Monoszló
Preceded by Lawrence	Ban of Severin; 1272	Succeeded by Paul Gutkeled
Preceded by Egidius Monoszló	Ban of Macsó uncertain 1275	Succeeded by Ugrin Csák
