= Mojs II =

Hungarian baron

Mojs (II)

Palatine of Hungary
- Reign: 1270–1272
- Predecessor: Lawrence, son of Kemény
- Successor: Lawrence, son of Kemény
- Born: 1200s
- Died: September/December 1280
- Noble family: Dárói kinship
- Spouses: 1, unidentified (uncertain); 2, unidentified relative of the Árpád dynasty
- Issue: Cecilia; Judith; Elizabeth a daughter
- Father: Mojs I
- Mother: Venys Monoszló

Mojs, also Moys, Majs or Majos (died September/December 1280) was a powerful Hungarian baron in the 13th century, who held various positions in the royal court since the early 1250s. He retained his influence until his death, owing to his marriage with an unidentified relative of the ruling Árpád dynasty. His last will and testament is a uniquely detailed source on the social history of the Árpádian era. Through his daughters, Mojs was maternal ancestor of the Meggyesi, Tamási, Herceg de Szekcső and Báthory de Somlyó noble families.

== Career ==
=== Béla's confidant ===
Mojs (II) was born in the first decade of the 13th century, as one of the three children of Mojs (I) and Venys Monoszló. The family background of the elder Mojs is unknown, but he definitely originated from a wealthy and notable kindred due to his marriage, which presumably possessed lands in Slavonia. He was a prominent supporter of Duke Béla since the 1220s, as a result his career in the royal court could not be fulfilled because of the tension between Béla and his father, King Andrew II. Mojs (II) had a brother Alexander, who was referred to as royal sword-bearer in 1233. Their unidentified sister married Nana Bár-Kalán, the son of Pousa Bár-Kalán.

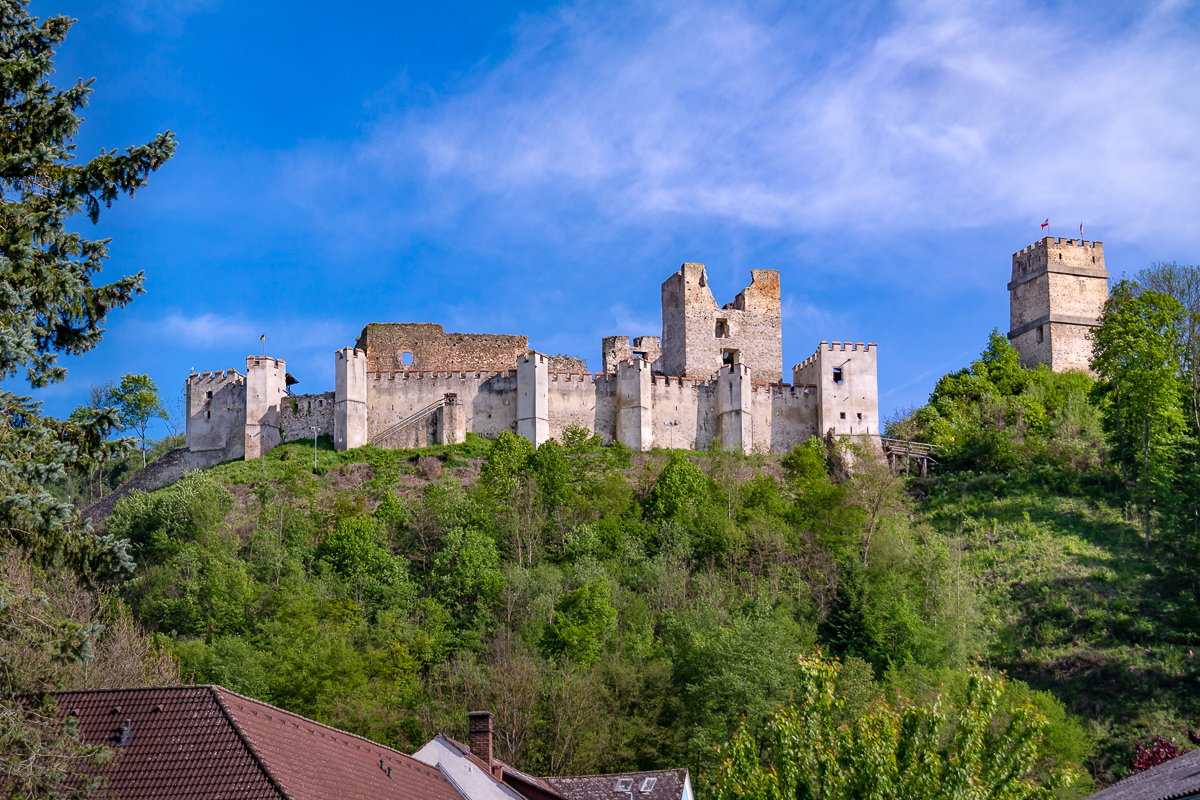
The ruins of Kirchschlag Castle, besieged and captured by Mojs in 1250

Due to his father's political orientation, the young Mojs raised in the ducal court of Béla, who ascended the Hungarian throne in 1235. It is plausible that Mojs Sr. died before that, and his political legacy was carried forward by his son, who first appeared in contemporary records in August 1245, when King Béla IV donated the village of Izdenc in Somogy County beyond the river Drava (present-day Zdenci, Croatia) to him. Mojs participated in the royal campaign against the Duchy of Austria in the summer of 1250. He commanded a huge contingent, which besieged and captured the castle of Kirchschlag. For his merits, he was made Master of the horse in 1251. He served in this capacity until 1254. Thereafter, he held the position of head of Gora ispánate (located in Zagreb County) from 1254 to 1256. Mojs functioned as Master of the stewards and ispán of Vrbas (or Orbász) County from 1256 to 1258.

When tensions emerged in the relationship between Béla IV and his eldest son and heir Duke Stephen by 1260, Mojs plausibly remained neutral. He even kept himself away from the events, when the confrontation sparked into a civil war in 1262 then 1264–65. Historian Jenő Szűcs considered Mojs' family relationship with the Árpád dynasty allowed him to balance between the two opposing parties. Nevertheless, Mojs definitely belonged to the king's confidants. He served as treasurer in the ducal court of King Béla's namesake favorite son Béla, Duke of Slavonia, in addition to his positions ispán of Somogy and Varaždin counties from 1260 to 1267. He was also referred to as ispán of Bihar County by a single document in 1264. After the closure of the civil war, Mojs participated in the joint military campaign of Béla IV and Stephen against Bulgaria in the summer of 1266. Around 1263, Mojs and his three relatives erected a Cistercian monastery at Ábrahám (near Dombóvár) in Tolna County, dedicated to Virgin Mary. Béla IV confirmed the foundation in that year. Mojs made further land donations to the monastery in 1272 and 1273, granting altogether 9 villages and 20 servant families from Tolna and Bodrog counties to the Cistercian friars.

=== Feudal anarchy ===
After the death of Béla IV, his son and former enemy Stephen V ascended the Hungarian throne in May 1270. The new monarch intended to reconcile with his late father's former partisans, in the midst of an ongoing crisis when his sister Anna, Duchess of Macsó and some Transdanubian pro-Béla lords fled Hungary and sought asylum in the court of Ottokar II of Bohemia. As a result, Mojs was made Palatine of Hungary by Stephen V few days before his coronation. Beside his most prestigious position, Mojs also served as ispán of Sopron County from 1270 to 1272 and Szeben County briefly in 1270. In addition to his family relationship with the Árpád dynasty and the Monoszló kindred – who enjoyed the support of Stephen V –, Mojs' person symbolized a unified government and Stephen's title ("king of whole Hungary"). When Stephen granted Esztergom County to Archbishop Philip Türje who crowned him king in Esztergom on or after 17 May, Mojs was entrusted to inaugurate the prelate to his new lordship of perpetual ispánate. Shortly after Mojs granted privileges to his own servants, the hospes (foreign "guest settlers") of Kazsok. When the feud between Stephen V and Ottokar II escalated into a large-scale war, Mojs joined the royal camp and participated in the military campaign in the spring of 1271. Despite his dignity of ispán there, the castle of Sopron was defended by brothers Osl and James Osl. When the two kings' envoys reached an agreement in Pressburg on 2 July, Mojs was among the signatories of the document. Mojs was the first Palatine, who assumed the dignity of Judge of the Cumans, which thereafter became part of its ex officio title to merge the two positions for centuries.

When Joachim Gutkeled kidnapped Stephen's heir, the 10-year-old Ladislaus in the summer of 1272, it marked the beginning of the era of "feudal anarchy". Stephen V, who unsuccessfully attempted to liberate his son, seriously fell ill. One of his last decisions was that he appointed Mojs as Ban of Slavonia on 3 August, in order to replace the treacherous Joachim Gutkeled. The king died three days later, on 6 August. In the upcoming years, two baronial groups rivaled for the supreme power under the nominal reign of Dowager Queen Elizabeth the Cuman. Joachim recovered his position of Ban by 22 August 1272. Thereafter, Mojs stayed away from the power struggles and was considered a confidant of the royal family. Queen Elizabeth returned the villages of Kazsok, Béc, Csap, Farnas and Ráksi in Somogy and Tolna counties to Mojs in that year. According to the lord, Béla IV's late wife, Queen Maria Laskarina unlawfully seized the settlements – his patrimony – from him prior to that. Mojs served as ispán of Somogy County from 1273 to 1274. Thereafter, he belonged to the household of Queen Isabella of Sicily, the wife of Ladislaus IV. He was treasurer of the queenly court between 1274 and 1275. Beside that, he also functioned as ispán of Szepes County in the same period. He was count (head) of the household in 1275. Meanwhile, a new civil war broke out between Joachim Gutkeled and Peter Csák in the following months. Mojs took part in Ugrin Csák's failed attempt to annihilate Joachim's troops at Föveny (near Polgárdi). Returning the royal court, Mojs again served as ispán of Somogy County from 1275 to 1276. He was Judge royal for a short time in the first half of 1276. Finally, Mojs served as treasurer of the queenly court from 1277 until his death in 1280.

== Personal life ==
=== Marriage(s) ===
It is widely academic standpoint that Mojs' unidentified wife had family relationship with the ruling Árpád dynasty. She first appeared in contemporary records in 1260, when King Béla IV permitted Mojs to be free to dispose of his inherited and acquired property to his wife and daughters, as he had no male descendants. She was again mentioned by her husband's last wills and testaments in 1267, 1270 (confirmation of the 1260 document), 1272 and 1280, as "lady of noble origin" (de nobiliorte prosapia) in the latter case. King Ladislaus IV referred to Mojs' unidentified wife as his "sister" (soror) on 2 January 1281. Ladislaus' successor Andrew III and his spouse Queen Fenenna of Kuyavia also referred to her as their "sister-in-law" (cognata) in the early 1290s.

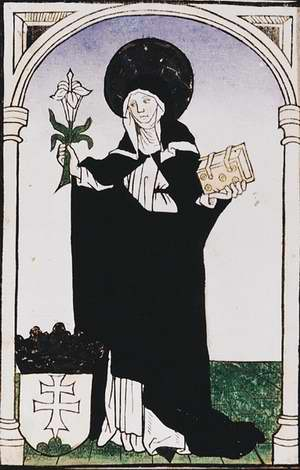
St. Margaret, whose hagiography contains important elements on the family relations of Mojs

Several historians tried to determine her identity and closer kinship to the royal dynasty. 16th-century chronicler and court historian András Valkai claimed Mojs' unidentified wife was identical with a certain Sophia, alleged daughter of Emeric, King of Hungary. Jesuit scholar László Turóczi wrote in his work Hungaria cum suis regibus (1768) that Mojs "probably" married to Sabina, the daughter of Béla IV and Maria Laskarina. There is no record of any "Sabina" in the genealogical line of the royal family. Historian Mór Wertner refused this theory in his monograph Az Árpádok családi története (1892); Béla IV did not refer to Mojs as his son-in-law in his charters (in contrast to Rostislav Mikhailovich), furthermore it would have been unworthy for Béla to engage his daughter with an elderly lord of Béla's similar age. Wertner also emphasized the aforementioned conflict between Mojs and Queen Maria as an exclusion factor. Wertner argued Mojs' wife was related to the Árpád dynasty only on maternal side and had some degree related to Queen Elizabeth the Cuman, the spouse of Stephen V. In his work Az Árpádok királyi vére Magyarország családaiban (1895), genealogist Bálint Kis de Baczka-Madaras considered Mojs' wife as a member of the senior branch of the Árpád dynasty, refusing Wertner's skepticism with examples of morganatic marriages of Hungarian princesses in previous periods and of the emphasis on conflicts within the dynasty, under which Queen Maria's move against Mojs could not have seemed unusual. Bálint Kis refused Turóczi's theory regarding the wife's name, which could have spread through a local oral tradition (she owned Kisszeben, in Slovak: Sabinov). Kis argued the name of Mojs' wife was Elizabeth, as she was referred to by his name one of the versions of the hagiography of St. Margaret. Accordingly, both Mojs and Elizabeth appeared before the sick bed of Ladislaus IV, who contracted an unidentified serious illness, but recovered from it in 1275. Accepting the opinion of Gusztáv Wenzel, Bálint Kis considered that "Elizabeth" was the daughter of Duke Rostislav Mikhailovich and Duchess Anna of Macsó.

Based on a last will and testament of a certain noble lady Leyphilt from 1312, historian János Karácsonyi claimed in his study (1923) that Mojs' widow was called "Sibylla" and she was the daughter of Anna, Queen Elizabeth's assumed sister. The document narrates, the Beguines of Buda lived in Sibylla's house, which building formerly belonged to the ownership of Mojs' wife, consequently Karácsonyi assumed the house was named after her. The historian even considered that Anna, Mojs' mother-in-law appeared before the sick bed of Ladislaus (1275) in the hagiography of St. Margaret, instead of Anna, Duchess of Macsó. Karácsonyi argued Mojs married twice. His first wife died either in 1267 or 1268, and Mojs later married the 20-year-old Sibylla, becoming a member of Stephen V's inner circle. One of the physicians, who cured the sick young king, was a certain Gratian, Mojs' personal physician. Karácsonyi assigned Queen Elizabeth and "Anna" to the gens Kán and the person of Jacob Svetoslav, but his whole theory was neglected or rejected by the later historiography. Nevertheless György Györffy accepted the "Sibylla" name variant. Emil Jakubovich, who also wrote a study in the same issue of journal Turul (1923), called Karácsonyi's paper "built on a whole chain of bold hypotheses". The historian proved that Queen Elizabeth actually had an unnamed sister, who married Gregory Monoszló. Jakubovich emphasized that Margaret's legend definitely states that Mojs' wife was Elizabeth. The investigation report of the canonization process incorrectly referred to Mojs as deceased person two occasions. Jakubovich did not rule out that Elizabeth was also a relative (cousin or more distant) of Queen Elizabeth the Cuman.

In her study (2005), historian Enikő Spekner emphasized the name Elizabeth and the person of Mojs do not appear in the earliest version of St. Margaret's legend. She also refused the name Sibylla, as the house could also bear name of a former head nun (magistra) of German origin, but by etymology the name may also mean the abstract meaning of devout, deeply religious women. Spekner also considered that Mojs married twice based on the age of his daughters (see below). Historian Tamás Kádár (2013) argued Mojs' wife Elizabeth was the niece or cousin of Queen Elizabeth. Historian Dóra Bachusz also considered that Mojs' wife originated from Queen Elizabeth's kinship. According to her, Mojs married twice because of the aforementioned arguments (the eldest daughter was born around 1226, but Mojs' widow – who personally visited the royal court then – was still alive in 1293) and the provisions of his last testament which have changed in the meantime after 1272. In addition, Mojs' wife was referred to as relative of the royal family only after 1280, before that no reference is made to this. Consequently, Bachusz argued Mojs' first wife died sometime between 1270 and 1272, and he remarried within a short time. She also considered that none of Mojs' four daughters were born from his second wife despite the subsequent family tradition (see below).

After the death of Mojs in 1280, his widow became one of the richest noblewomen in the Kingdom of Hungary, inheriting large-scale possessions and personal property. In addition, she also owned Békásmegyer and the aforementioned house in Buda. She was granted the estates Bagamérfölde and Cséptelek in Csepel Island by Ladislaus IV in October 1283. The king's spouse, Queen Isabella donated the land of Zapakon near Ercsi in Fejér County to her sometime before 1287. She also acquired the village of Görbő (today part of Pincehely) in Tolna County from Isabella in exchange for Cséptelek – the village was formerly belonged to the monastery of Ábrahám in accordance with Mojs' will. Spekner considered that the widow was a strong confidant of the queen. When Ladislaus IV imprisoned his wife in 1286–87 at the Dominican monastery of Rabbits' Island, the widow stayed with her. Because of this, Wertner and Karácsonyi incorrectly claimed that she joined the Dominican Order too. In fact, the widow joined the Beguines and established a monastery in her house at Buda sometime in the 1280s. She donated the land of Zapakon to princess Elizabeth in 1287. Upon her request, Queen Fenenna confirmed the previous land donations of Ladislaus IV in 1290. By that time, the widow transferred the right of use of the lands Bagamérfölde and Cséptelek to the Beguine nuns. She returned the village of Görbő and its accessories to the Ábrahám monastery in 1292. She petitioned to King Andrew III to confirm her last will and testament in 1293. In the document, she bequeathed the aforementioned lands in Csepel Island and Békásmegyer to the Beguine monastery, in addition to her house in Buda. Mojs' widow died sometime between 1293 and 1296. When Andrew III granted tax exemption to the peoples of the aforementioned estates, he referred to her as a deceased person.

=== Children ===
Mojs had four daughters. Two of them, Cecilia and Judith entered the Dominican Order and lived in the nunnery at Rabbits' Island. They testified during the investigation phase of the canonization process of their fellow Dominican nun Margaret – daughter of Béla IV – in 1276. According to their own declarations, Cecilia was approximately 50 years old and Judith was exactly 44 years old during the inquiry, consequently they were born around 1226 and 1232, respectively (i.e. Mojs and his unidentified wife had to be born in the 1200s or at the latest 1210). Cecilia resided in the monasteries of Veszprém then Rabbits' Island since her childhood, while Judith joined the Dominican nuns around 1265.

Mojs' third daughter Elizabeth was the first wife of Nicholas Pok, an influential lord in Transylvania in the last decades of the 13th century. Through their eldest son Maurice, they were ancestors of the notable Meggyesi family, which became extinct in 1492. Their granddaughter Anna married Ladislaus Báthory (Bátori). The couple were the direct progenitors of the illustrious Báthory de Somlyó family, which later elevated as royal dynasty of Transylvania and Poland. Due to this marriage, their 16th-century courtly propaganda was able to emphasize that the Báthorys descended from the Árpád dynasty. Although Nicholas Pok later married for the second time to Catherine Kaplon, the Báthorys' chronicler András Valkai definitely stated in his genealogical poem (Genealogia historica regum Hungariae…, c. 1576–81) that Maurice – father of Anna – descended from the kinship of Mojs, but he incorrectly alleged that Mojs and "Sophia" (as he identified Mojs' wife) were the parents of Maurice, neglecting a generation – Nicholas Pok and Elizabeth – between them (it is possible that Emeric and Andrew II were more suitable ancestors for the Catholic Báthorys – primarily King Stephen Báthory – than Ladislaus IV the Cuman).

The fourth unidentified daughter married Henry Kőszegi, one of the most powerful oligarchs in the Kingdom of Hungary at the turn of the 13th and 14th centuries, who drew his suzerainty over Upper Slavonia and Southern Transdanubia, party through to the heritage from his father-in-law Mojs. Through their two sons, John and Peter respectively, Henry and his spouse were ancestors of the Tamási and Herceg de Szekcső noble families, which rose to prominence by the 15th century. They also had a daughter, who married Turcho, a member of the maternal kinship of King Andrew III, strengthening the existing relationship with the royal dynasty.

=== Last wills and testaments ===
As Mojs had no legitimate male heirs, he compiled his last will and testament with the consent of his nephew Alexander for the first time in 1267, when he was in his sixties. The document guaranteed royal confirmation in the case of Mojs' death without a son, and included the right of revocation and amendment. According to the document, his wife and daughters would have inherited together Igal, two villages named Pozsony, Borhod, Oszlár, a portion in Derecske and his estates beyond the river Drava – Rácsa, Musina, Bakva, Izdenc and Sudyn. In 1272, Mojs modified his last will and attributed some of his estates only to his daughters who joined the Dominican nuns, who were also beneficiaries. According to Dóra Bachusz, Mojs remarried by then, therefore, it was necessary to separate the heritage in order to prevent subsequent disputes.

Mojs' health had deteriorated rapidly by 1280. After he fell ill, he compiled his final will and testament on his deathbed on the basis of an oral communication on 26 September 1280 in the presence of Thomas, Bishop of Vác, who also functioned as chancellor of Queen Isabella, representatives of the collegiate chapter of Buda (which acted as a place of authentication in this case), the superiors of the Franciscans and Dominicans, along with others. During the process, Mojs declared the fullness of his mental capacity. The 1280 last will was a "codicillus" in technical sense, which upheld but supplemented/amended the previous will. This type of phrase was preserved from law system of Classical antiquity, and occurs only four times in Hungary in the age of Árpáds. Legal historian Beáta Kulcsár attributed the technical term to Bishop Thomas and one of the members of his professional staff in the cathedral chapter of Vác, which recorded the document. Mojs' widow inherited Izdenc as a wedding gift and Rácsa, Uga in Tolna County, the marturina of three villages and twenty horses from her husband's stud due to "marital love". Mojs recommended an option for his nephew Alexander. Alongside a valuable gold belt, he could choose a settlement called Megyericse (Međurača, Croatia), or the joint lordship of Musina and Bakva (in the latter case, the widow would have inherited Megyericse). Mojs bequeathed his Transylvanian properties of Zolun (Zólyom) and Meggyes (today Medieșu Aurit, Romania) to his son-in-law Nicholas Pok, who moved the centre of his domains to the province thereafter. His other son-in-law Henry Kőszegi inherited the castle of Gordova (Grdjevac) and its surrounding lands in Slavonia. Mojs' sister, who joined the nuns at Székesfehérvár, was granted Nyék and Szakály in addition to the marturina of Megyericse. Mojs bequeathed several landholdings to the monastery of Ábrahám too; for instance, Ábrahám, Kurd, Görbő, Csibrák, Lázi and Bot (today a borough of Etyek). The Dominican nuns of Rabbits' Island gained Igal, two villages named Pozsony, Burkud, Aszlav, Ráksi, Kisbéc, Kazsok and Ecseny in accordance with his 1272 letter of intent, in which he granted them a right of usufruct over these estates. Papal legate Philip of Fermo, who resided in Hungary since that year, was granted the village Csap with its vineyards.

When Ladislaus IV confirmed his last will on 2 January 1281, Mojs was already referred as a deceased person, consequently he died in the last months of 1280. His widow shared her inherited property in accordance with the document. Meanwhile, Alexander also died, thus his son Mojs III had the opportunity to claim the villages Musina and Bakva, while the widow acquired Megyericse. After a brief disagreement, when she refused to fulfill the will, the widow handed over Meggyes and Zólyom to Elizabeth and Nicholas Pok – because of this, Bachusz considers she was only stepmother of Mojs' daughter.

== Sources ==
- Bachusz, Dóra (2019). ""Soror nostra, nobilis et religiosa domina". Adalékok Moys mester özvegyének alakjához ["Soror nostra, nobilis et religiosa domina". Notes on Master Moys's Widow]". In Rudolf, Veronika; Veres, Kristóf György (eds.). Opuscula historica III. Tanulmányok a Történész műhelyből (in Hungarian). ELTE Eötvös József Collegium Történész Műhely. pp. 133–147. ISBN 978-615-5897-20-7.
- Jakubovich, Emil (1922–23). "Kún Erzsébet nőtestvére [Elizabeth the Cuman's sister]". Turul (in Hungarian). 37: 14–27. ISSN 1216-7258.
- Karácsonyi, János (1922–23). "Magyar Sibilla [Sibylla of Hungary]". Turul (in Hungarian). 37: 3–13. ISSN 1216-7258.
- Kulcsár, Beáta (2006). ""In mortis articulo constitutus…": egy Árpád-kori előkelő végrendelkezésének tanulságai ["In mortis articulo constitutus…": Conclusions Drawn from the Testamentary Disposition of a Noble (Proceres) of the Arpadian Period]". Studia Caroliensia (in Hungarian). 7 (3–4): 47–64. ISSN 1419-1334.
- Markó, László (2006). A magyar állam főméltóságai Szent Istvántól napjainkig: Életrajzi Lexikon [Great Officers of State in Hungary from King Saint Stephen to Our Days: A Biographical Encyclopedia] (in Hungarian). Helikon Kiadó. ISBN 963-208-970-7.
- Mikó, Árpád (2013). "Valkai András (1540–1586) Báthory-genealógiája. Báthory István király mint az Árpádok leszármazottja [The Báthory Genealogy of András Valkai (1540–1586). King Stephen Báthory as Descendant of the Árpáds]". Irodalomtörténeti közlemények (in Hungarian). 117 (5): 583–599. ISSN 0021-1486.
- Spekner, Enikő (2005). "A magyarországi beginák és beginakolostorok 13. századi története [The 13th-Century History of Beguines and Beguine Monasteries in Hungary]". In Almási, Tibor; Draskóczy, István; Jancsó, Éva (eds.). Studia professoris–professor studiorum. Tanulmányok Érszegi Géza hatvanadik születésnapjára (in Hungarian). National Archives of Hungary. pp. 297–313. ISBN 963-631-173-0.
- Szőcs, Tibor (2014). A nádori intézmény korai története, 1000–1342 [An Early History of the Palatinal Institution: 1000–1342] (in Hungarian). Magyar Tudományos Akadémia Támogatott Kutatások Irodája. ISBN 978-963-508-697-9.
- Szűcs, Jenő (2002). Az utolsó Árpádok [The Last Árpáds] (in Hungarian). Osiris Kiadó. ISBN 963-389-271-6.
- Wertner, Mór (1892). Az Árpádok családi története [Family History of the Árpáds] (in Hungarian). Szabó Ferencz N.-eleméri plébános & Pleitz Fer. Pál Könyvnyomdája.
- Zsoldos, Attila (2005). Az Árpádok és asszonyaik. A királynéi intézmény az Árpádok korában [The Árpáds and their Women: The Institution of Queenship in the Era of the Árpáds] (in Hungarian). MTA Történettudományi Intézete. ISBN 963-8312-98-X.
- Zsoldos, Attila (2007). Családi ügy: IV. Béla és István ifjabb király viszálya az 1260-as években [A family affair: The Conflict between Béla IV and Junior King Stephen in the 1260s] (in Hungarian). História, MTA Történettudományi Intézete. ISBN 978-963-9627-15-4.
- Zsoldos, Attila (2011). Magyarország világi archontológiája, 1000–1301 [Secular Archontology of Hungary, 1000–1301] (in Hungarian). História, MTA Történettudományi Intézete. ISBN 978-963-9627-38-3.

Political offices
Preceded by Ernye Ákos	Master of the horse 1251–1254	Succeeded by Lawrence
Preceded by Nicholas Budmér	Master of the stewards 1256–1258	Succeeded by Lawrence Aba
Preceded by Lawrence	Palatine of Hungary; 1270–1272	Succeeded by Lawrence
Preceded by Gregory Monoszló	Judge of the Cumans; 1270–1272	Succeeded by Lawrence
Preceded by Joachim Gutkeled	Ban of Slavonia; 1272	Succeeded by Joachim Gutkeled
Preceded by Ugrin Csák	Judge royal 1276	Succeeded by Maurice Osl
