= Nicholas Monoszló =

Hungarian baron

Nicholas (III) Monoszló

Judge royal
- Reign: 1270–1272
- Predecessor: Ernye Ákos
- Successor: Denis Péc
- Died: 1272 (?)
- Noble family: gens Monoszló
- Spouse: unknown
- Issue: Lawrence; Egidius III
- Father: Andrew

Nicholas (III) from the kindred Monoszló (Hungarian: Monoszló nembeli (III.) Miklós; possibly died 1272) was a Hungarian baron, who served as Judge royal between 1270 and 1272, during the reign of Stephen V.

== Career ==
Nicholas was born into the genus (gens) Monoszló as the son of Andrew. He first appeared in contemporary sources in 1256, when he sold his estate south of the Sava along with his brother Kenéz to distant relatives from the kindred. According to a royal charter from 11 May 1271, Nicholas served as ispán (head) of Szerém County around November 1262, when joined Duke Stephen, who rebelled against his father Béla IV and adopted the title of junior king in that year. As a result, the king confiscated his lands across the river Drava. Nicholas actively participated in Stephen's victorious campaign during the civil war from 1264 to 1265. He appeared before the elderly Béla IV in the royal court in 1269 to negotiate over Slavonian estate matters with his relative, Gregory Monoszló, who served as Judge of the Cumans, then belonging to Duke Stephen's court.

When Duke Stephen ascended the throne as Stephen V following his father's death in 1270, Nicholas was appointed Judge royal, as one of those lords – for instance including Peter and Matthew Csák and Nicholas' relative Egidius Monoszló – who entered government service after years of anti-King position and participation in the war against Béla. Beside that, Nicholas also functioned as ispán of Somogy County from 1270 to 1272. For his role in the 1260s conflict, Nicholas received Forró and Ináncs estates next to the Hernád river, in addition to Heves and the surrounding villages. Stephen V also donated Jolsva and Murány Castle (today Jelšava and Muráň in Slovakia, respectively) to his loyal soldier in his May 1271 royal diploma. When a rebellious lord, Joachim Gutkeled turned against Stephen V and kidnapped the young prince, Ladislaus in the summer of 1272, the king reorganized the government structure in his last days. Among others, Nicholas was replaced as Judge royal by Denis Péc and ispán of Somogy County by Ernye Ákos. Nicholas was made Master of the horse, succeeding Albert Ákos. He also served as ispán of Szeben County during that time. However Nicholas probably held both offices only for less than a month because Stephen soon fell seriously ill and died on 6 August.

== Later life ==
Nicholas owned the estate of Forró at most until January 1273, when the previous holder, a certain Aladar, son of Csete, a loyal supporter of Elizabeth the Cuman regained the land from Stephen's successor, the minor Ladislaus IV (during that time, Elizabeth's co-regency lasted until 1277). To explain that change of ownership, historian Attila Zsoldos considers either Nicholas' death without legal heirs by that time and a confiscation act for some reason. However two of his sons, Lawrence and Egidius were mentioned by a diploma from 1288.

After Stephen V's death, Nicholas' relative, Egidius Monoszló laid siege to Elizabeth's palace in Székesfehérvár to prevent the minor Ladislaus' coronation, but her ally, Joachim Gutkeled's supporters routed him in late August 1272. Egidius, alongside his brother, Gregory, fled to Pressburg (today Bratislava, Slovakia); he captured the town and ceded it to Ottokar II of Bohemia. Zsoldos argues, Nicholas Monoszó participated in his kindred's rebellion against the royal power, thus his lands were confiscated following that. Later the Monoszlós returned to Hungary and made peace with Elizabeth, receiving back their confiscated lands. There is no similar information about Nicholas' estates. Zsoldos considers, Nicholas was killed in the Székesfehérvár attack itself, or died during the Monoszlós' exile in Prague. Nevertheless, his confiscated lands were not inherited by his sons.

== Sources ==
- Érszegi, Géza; Solymosi, László (1981). "Az Árpádok királysága, 1000–1301 [The Monarchy of the Árpáds, 1000–1301]". In Solymosi, László (ed.). Magyarország történeti kronológiája, I: a kezdetektől 1526-ig [Historical Chronology of Hungary, Volume I: From the Beginning to 1526] (in Hungarian). Akadémiai Kiadó. pp. 79–187. ISBN 963-05-2661-1.
- Zsoldos, Attila (2009). "Miklós országbíró [Judge royal Nicholas]". In Neumann, Tibor; Rácz, György (eds.). Honoris causa. Tanulmányok Engel Pál tiszteletére (Analecta mediaevalia III) (in Hungarian). PPKE Történettudományi Intézete. pp. 519–549. ISBN 978-963-9627-25-3.
- Zsoldos, Attila (2011). Magyarország világi archontológiája, 1000–1301 [Secular Archontology of Hungary, 1000–1301] (in Hungarian). História, MTA Történettudományi Intézete. ISBN 978-963-9627-38-3.

Nicholas III Genus Monoszló Born: ? Died: c. 1272
Political offices
Preceded by Ernye Ákos	Judge royal 1270–1272	Succeeded by Denis Péc
Preceded by Albert Ákos	Master of the horse 1272	Succeeded by Ugrin Csák
