= Ernye Ákos =

Hungarian landowner

Judge royal
- Reign: 1267–1270; 1274
- Predecessor: Lawrence, son of Kemény (1st term); Nicholas Gutkeled (2nd term)
- Successor: Nicholas Monoszló (1st term); Denis Péc (2nd term)
- Born: c. 1225
- Died: after January 1275
- Noble family: gens Ákos
- Issue: Stephen
- Father: Erdő I

Ernye from the kindred Ákos (Erne; Hungarian: Ákos nembeli Ernye; died after January 1275) was a Hungarian baron and landowner. He is best known for saving the life of king Béla IV after the disastrous Battle of Mohi in 1241. He participated in various military campaigns in the following decades. He elevated into the group of most powerful barons by the second half of the reign of Béla IV. He retained his influence even after Béla's death.

== Family ==
The name of Ernye (also Erne, Erney or Ernei) derived from the Latin variant Irenaeus. He was born around 1225 into the Ernye branch of the gens (clan) Ákos as the son of Erdő I, who resided in Pályi in Bihar County and was only mentioned in his own right in the Regestrum Varadinense in 1220. As Erdő's parentage is unknown, there is an inability to connect Ernye's family to the other branches of the prestigious and extended Ákos clan.

Ernye had two brothers, Albert the Great, who served as master of the horse (1270–1272), then ban of Severin (1272), and Erdő II, ispán (count) of Tolna (1272) and Trencsén Counties (1274). Ernye's only son from his unidentified wife was Stephen, palatine of Hungary (1301–1307), who became one of the most powerful oligarchs during the interregnum after the death of king Andrew III.

== Career ==
=== Courtly knight ===
It is presumable that Ernye spent his childhood in the royal court, as a member of the group of so-called "royal youth" (Hungarian: királyi ifjak, Latin: iuvenis noster), who supported the monarchs and took a leading role in royal military campaigns. Ernye belonged to the confidants of Duke Béla, who had long opposed his father's politics. When Béla IV ascended the Hungarian throne in 1235, he rose to prominence and was a loyal supporter of the king's efforts. As he came from a relatively poor branch of the Ákos clan, his only hope was military service in the royal court to rise in the social hierarchy. As a result, he did not emphasize his origin in the contemporary documents, and also adopted his own coat-of-arms, which apparently had more prestige than his inherited insignia. Ernye consciously separated himself from the clan and emphasized his titles and dignities, which were acquired by his own power.

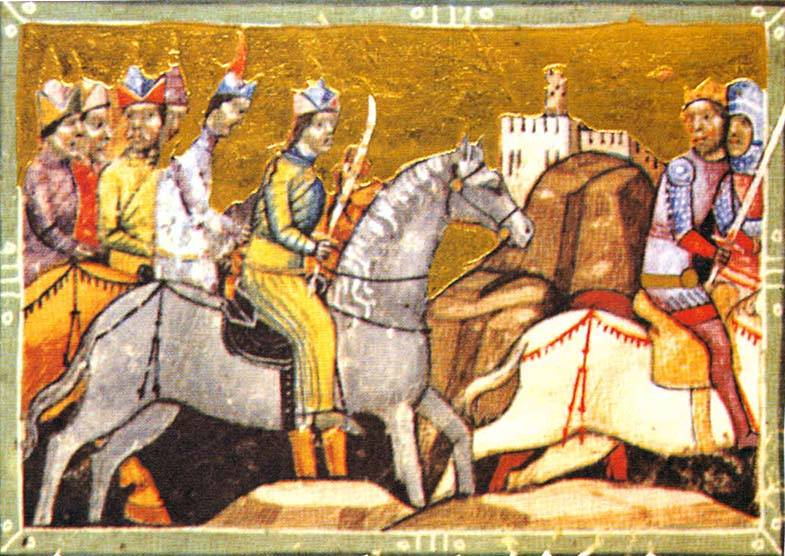
Béla IV and his soldiers flee from the Battle of Mohi (1241), depicted in the Illuminated Chronicle

Ernye was first mentioned by contemporary records and charters in 1241. During the Mongol invasion of Europe, he participated in the Battle of Mohi as a heavily armored knight under the monarch's banner on 11 April 1241, where the Hungarian army suffered a decisive defeat and many noblemen and prelates were killed. According to the Illuminated Chronicle, during the flight from the battlefield, Ernye saved the life of king Béla IV by handing over his full-strength horse. Ernye then proceeded to fight against the pursuing Mongols to hold them back while Béla IV and his escort fled to Pressburg (Pozsony; today Bratislava, Slovakia). Although he was seriously injured while defending the king's retreat, he managed to recover and followed his king into exile at Klis Fortress, where he spied for his lord at the enemy's camp.

After the withdrawal of the Mongols in 1242, Ernye became one of the steadiest and most reliable advocates of Béla IV during the subsequent rebuilding and structural reorganization of the Kingdom of Hungary. He received large amounts of land in Heves and Borsod counties and Erdőkövesd was secured by the Ákos clan during that time. Ernye obtained permission to build and strengthen the Dédes Castle, which became the center of his estates. Despite this, there is no record of him receiving any official positions immediately following the Mongol attack.

Ernye fought in the royal army in a war against Austria in 1246 and participated in the Battle of the Leitha River, where Frederick the Quarrelsome was killed. In the battle, Ernye killed a "famous Austrian knight" with his spear, and presented his severed head to the Hungarian king. He also took part in a campaign against Austria in the summer of 1250, when Béla made a plundering raid into Austria and Styria in the summer of 1250, in retaliation of a former Austrian incursion into Hungary. The Austrian and Hungarian troops clashed at Himberg near Vienna. There, Ernye dueled with Austrian knight Wernhard Preussel, the captain of Lower Austria and lord of Himberg. Ernye pushed him off the horse with his lance, instantly killing him. Thereafter the Hungarian troops besieged and seized the castle. Other Austrian sources identify Ernye's opponent as Henry Preussel (Wernhard's brother), who later was a confidant of Béla IV. Subsequently, Ernye participated in the sieges of Waltersdorf and Kirchschlag. The main phase of the conflict ended with these successes, but a small contingent of Hungarians and Cumans burnt Kleinmariazell.

=== Powerful baron ===
Ernye was appointed master of the horse in 1250 and held that office until 1251. He also served as ispán of Szolgagyőr (Galgóc) ispánate within Nyitra County in 1250–51, ispán of Varaždin County in 1251, Borsod County in 1254, and Bács County in 1256.

An authentic charter issued in 1261 refers to him as "former ban of Transylvania" (Latin: banus quondam Transiluanus), thus he held the office of voivode of Transylvania sometimes before that year. The last known office-holder was Lawrence, who functioned as voivode for 10 years between 1242 and 1252, but there is no evidence that Ernye had already filled the position since 1252. According to historian Gyula Kristó, Ernye's unusual title ("Ban of Transylvania") reflected a short-lived reform concept, when Transylvania would have granted similar autonomous municipal system, like the Banate of Slavonia. A Mongol army attacking the southern regions of Transylvania was defeated by voivode Ernye in 1260. Later in that year, as a supporter of Béla IV, he was presumably dismissed by the king's son, Stephen who had just taken over Transylvania with the title of duke. However, this action by the duke was a result of emerging tensions between Béla and Stephen, not because of any animosity between the duke and Ernye.

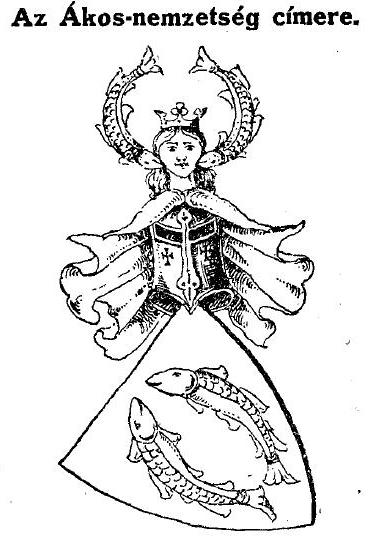
Coat of arms of the gens Ákos

At this time, Béla's relationship with his oldest son and heir, Stephen, became tense, which caused a civil war lasting until 1266. After a brief conflict, Béla IV and his son divided the country and Stephen received the lands to the east of the Danube in 1262. Ernye remained a loyal and dedicated partisan of Béla IV, despite the fact that majority of his possessions laid in the territory of Duke Stephen's realm. As a result, he moved his centre of his domain to Füzitő in Komárom County, abandoning his landholdings in Borsod County. Duke Stephen's local supporter Panyit Miskolc tried to take advantage of the situation and acquired several lands in the county with the permission of Stephen. The rivalry between the two clans lasted until 1281, and less intensively, until the end of the 13th century.

Béla IV appointed Ernye as ispán of Nyitra Country in 1263. Because of the prolonged siege of Feketehalom, the Palatine Henry Kőszegi sent Ernye with an army of Cuman warriors to Tiszántúl, in order to hinder Duke Stephen's counter-offensive. The battle took place somewhere west of Várad (present-day Oradea, Romania) in February 1265. Ernye suffered a serious defeat and was himself captured by the enemy, Peter Csák's army. According to a royal charter, Peter Csák personally defeated Ernye during a duel. Another document says, his long-time rival Panyit Miskolc presented the fettered prisoner Ernye in the ducal court of Stephen following the clash. The king did not appoint a new ispán while Ernye was being held as a prisoner and after the Battle of Isaszeg in March 1265, the king was forced to accept the authority of Stephen in the eastern parts of the kingdom. On 23 March 1266, father and son confirmed the peace in the Convent of the Blessed Virgin on 'Rabbits' Island and Ernye, among others, was released from captivity.

Following the release, he served as judge royal from 1267 to 1269 and possibly into 1270 based on information relating to his deputy. Besides that he also functioned as ispán of Vas County. After the death of king Béla IV and Stephen V's accession to the throne in 1270, Ernye did not lose his political influence despite the earlier conflicts with the new king. This lack of reduction in political power is demonstrated by the fact that he was able to participate in a campaign against Ottokar II of Bohemia that same year. He was one of the barons, who led a punitive expedition to the territory of the Duchy of Styria, avenging their incursions to Hungary. Stephen V appointed Ernye as ispán of Varaždin County in 1271 and again in 1272 and he also served as master of the treasury and ispán of Somogy County in 1272. Ernye acted as a testimony during the conclusion of the Peace of Pressburg between Stephen V and Ottokar II in July 1271.

The sudden death of Stephen V and subsequent coronation of the 10-year-old Ladislaus IV in August 1272 allowed Ernye to become one of the most powerful barons in the country. During Ladislaus' minority, many groupings of barons — primarily the Csáks, Kőszegis, and Gutkeleds — fought against each other for supreme power. According to historian Jenő Szűcs, the elderly honored barons, who were made palatines and other chief officials, such Denis Péc, Ernye Ákos and Roland Rátót were considered stable points and "beauty spot" in the fast-changing governments during the first five regnal years of Ladislaus. It is not possible to decide which baronial group Ernye belonged to. His influence increased further in November of that year when duke Béla of Macsó was assassinated and the barons partitioned the territory of the Duchy of Macsó among themselves. Ernye Ákos received the title of ban of Só and Ozora in 1273, replacing Henry I Kőszegi from the Héder clan. At the end of his life, Ernye Ákos served as judge royal for the second term and ispán of Szatmár County from September to 31 December 1274. According to some sources, he held that office in 1275 and 1278 as well, but this is unlikely as most sources indicate that he died sometime soon after January 1275.

== His landholdings ==
After a division of estates within the Ákos clan sometimes in the first third of the 13th century, Erdő and his son Ernye owned portions of Pályi, Csalános and Alba in Bihar County and Mérk in Szatmár County. Ernye's branch still possessed these villages and lands at the turn of the 13th and 14th centuries. The first documented land acquisition by Ernye was in 1248, when unlawfully seized Cserép from the Bishopric of Eger. Instead of punishing his subject, Béla IV recovered Cserép to Bishop Lampert Hont-Pázmány and "compensated" Ernye with a royal estate, Ecseg. Still, the ownership over Cserép became a subject of debate between the Diocese of Eger and the Ákos clan in the upcoming decades. Ernye was granted the land of Terebes in Szatmár County (present-day part of Mărgineni, Bacău in Romania) in July 1250. A year later, when already served as ispán of Varaždin County, he became the owner of four undetermined "Slavonian villages" in the county, in November 1251.

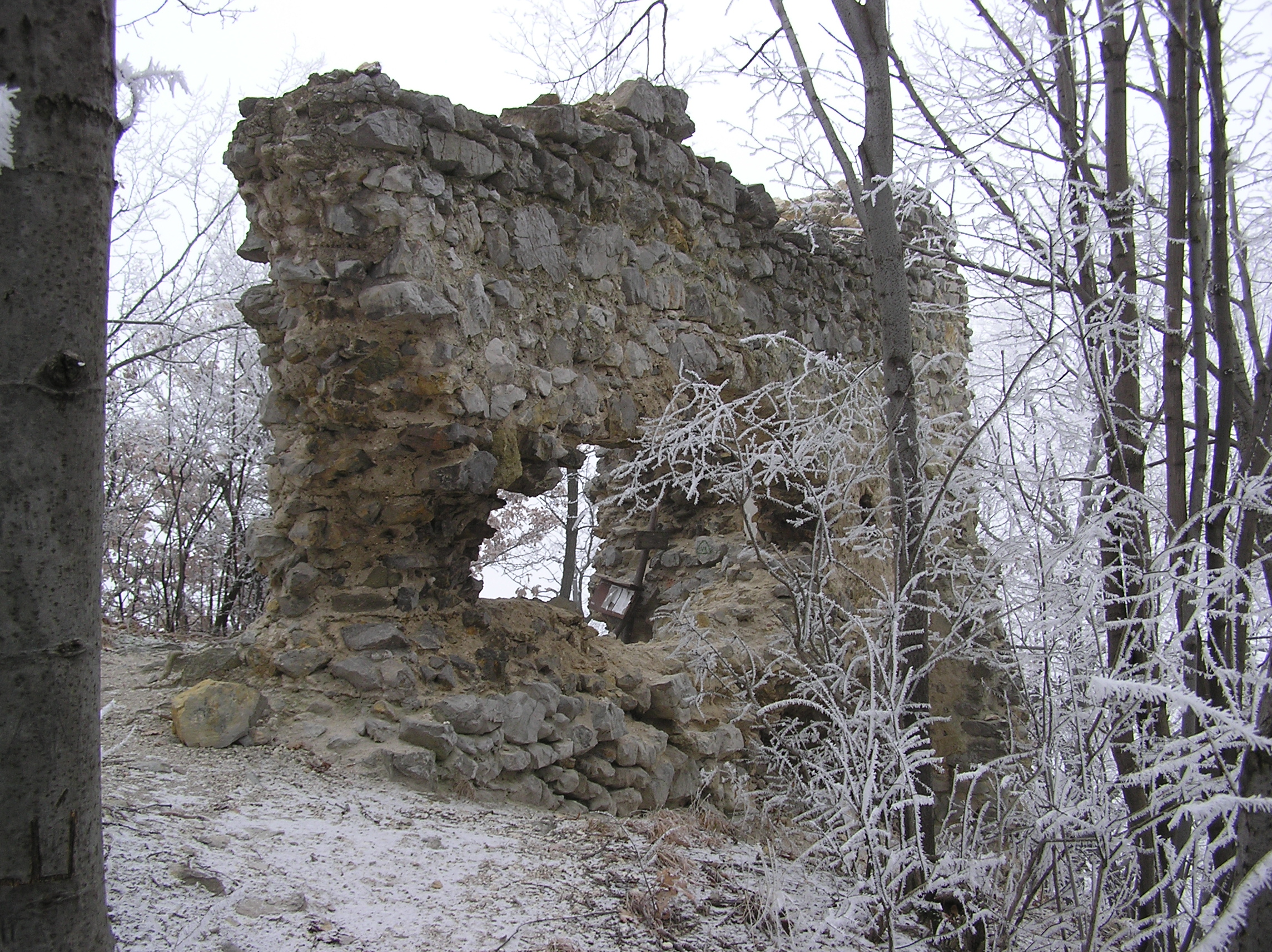
Ruins of the Dédes Castle within Bükk National Park

The number of Ernye's lands rapidly grew in Borsod County, his chosen centre of his activity. Sometimes in the period between 1247 and 1254, he acquired the castle of Dédes. The construction of the fort was originally started by the local castle warriors, but their money ran out. After financial difficulties, they sold the third of the land to the local powerful gens Miskolc. By 1254, Ernye owned the now fully finished castle. File Miskolc, the provost of Zagreb, and his family sold their several lands in Borsod County in the same time, and moved their interests to Valkó County in Slavonia. Following the Mongol invasion, only two castles were erected in Borsod County: Dédes Castle, owned by Ernye and Füzérkő Castle, which was owned by the Bishopric of Eger. In 1254, Béla IV donated him the village of Mályi, which laid near Ernye's castle. Before 1255, he also acquired Köves and Pétervására in Heves County. When he served as ispán of Bács County in 1256, he owned an undetermined estate, which was bordering on Csörög.

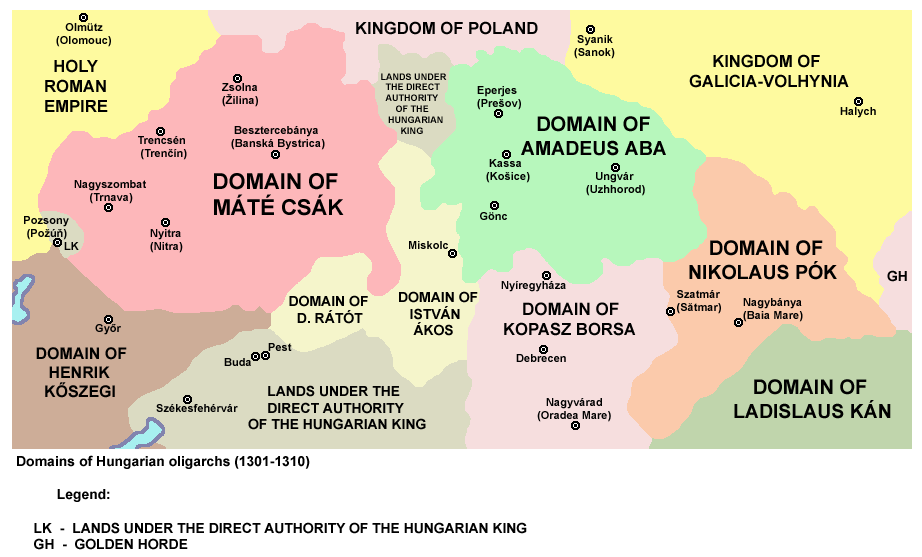
Area (white) ruled by Stephen Ákos and his genus during the interregnum (1301–1310)

In the following years, Ernye was granted Diósgyőr, Felbarca, Héty and Kondó in Borsod County, in addition to Hernádnémeti in Zemplén County and Böszörménytelek (present-day in Hajdúböszörmény) in Szabolcs County. He already owned Diósgyőr sometimes after 1261, which then was mentioned as a "land belongs to Borsod Castle". Several names of locations surrounding Diósgyőr (for instance, Erenyő, Bánfolyás, Kis-Erenyő; present-day all in Miskolc) preserved the owner Ernye Ákos' name or title till nowadays. It is possible Ernye already built a small fort in Diósgyőr, which became a basis of the future castle. Before 1265, Ernye donated the villages of Kazinc, Lubna and Harica to his familiaris, comes Alexander Karászi. Ernye also tried to extend his interests in Varaždin County, where embroiled a conflict with Dietrich II von Marburg, the Bishop of Gurk and his men at the borderland of Slavonia and Styria. They concluded truce upon the mediation of Thomas, ispán of Marócsa, Inus, ispán of Zagreb County and Barleus, ispán of Vrbóc in 1267 with the deadline 5 June, then 6 October.

His only son, Stephen Ákos continued his father's policy of land acquisition and established a dominion in the last decades of the 13th century, based on his father's estates, which consisted of around thirty villages surrounding Dédes and Diósgyőr. Stephen ruled de facto independently Borsod County, wedged in between the territory of Matthew Csák (north-western counties) and the dominion of Amadeus Aba (northern and north-eastern counties of the kingdom). The gens Ákos usurped royal prerogatives in his dominion, e.g. he granted lands and nobility to his followers. Stephen governed his possessions from the stone Diósgyőr Castle.

== Sources ==
- Engel, Pál (2001). The Realm of St Stephen: A History of Medieval Hungary, 895–1526. I.B. Tauris Publishers. ISBN 1-86064-061-3.
- Kis, Péter (1995). ""A király hű bárója" (Ákos nembeli Ernye pályafutása) ["The King's Loyal Baron: The Career of Ernye from the Kindred Ákos]". Fons. 2 (3). Szentpétery Imre Történettudományi Alapítvány: 273–316. ISSN 1217-8020.
- Markó, László (2006). A magyar állam főméltóságai Szent Istvántól napjainkig: Életrajzi Lexikon [Great Officers of State in Hungary from King Saint Stephen to Our Days: A Biographical Encyclopedia] (in Hungarian). Helikon Kiadó. ISBN 963-208-970-7.
- Rudolf, Veronika (2023). Közép-Európa a hosszú 13. században [Central Europe in the Long 13th Century] (in Hungarian). Arpadiana XV., Research Centre for the Humanities. ISBN 978-963-416-406-7.
- Sălăgean, Tudor (2005). "Romanian Society in the Early Middle Ages (9th–14th Centuries AD)". In Pop, Ioan-Aurel; Bolovan, Ioan (eds.). History of Romania: Compendium. Romanian Cultural Institute (Center for Transylvanian Studies). pp. 133–207. ISBN 978-973-7784-12-4.
- Szűcs, Jenő (2002). Az utolsó Árpádok [The Last Árpáds] (in Hungarian). Osiris Kiadó. ISBN 963-389-271-6.
- Zsoldos, Attila (2007). Családi ügy: IV. Béla és István ifjabb király viszálya az 1260-as években [A family affair: The Conflict between Béla IV and Junior King Stephen in the 1260s] (in Hungarian). História, MTA Történettudományi Intézete. ISBN 978-963-9627-15-4.
- Zsoldos, Attila (2011). Magyarország világi archontológiája, 1000–1301 [Secular Archontology of Hungary, 1000–1301] (in Hungarian). História, MTA Történettudományi Intézete. ISBN 978-963-9627-38-3.

Ernye Genus Ákos Born: c. 1225 Died: after January 1275
Political offices
Preceded by Csák Hahót	Master of the horse 1250–1251	Succeeded by Mojs
Preceded by Lawrence	Voivode of Transylvania b. 1261	Succeeded by Csák Hahót
Preceded by Lawrence, son of Kemény	Judge royal 1267–1270	Succeeded by Nicholas Monoszló
Preceded by Egidius Monoszló	Master of the treasury 1272	Succeeded by Joachim Gutkeled
Preceded by Henry Kőszegi	Ban of Ozora and Só; 1273	Abolished
Preceded by Nicholas Gutkeled	Judge royal 1274	Succeeded by Denis Péc
