= Master of the Horse (Kingdom of Hungary) =

The Master of the Horse (German: Königlicher Oberststallmeister, Hungarian: főlovászmester, and Latin: agazonum regalium magistri or magister agazonum) was one of the high officials of the royal household in the Kingdom of Hungary. Masters of the Horse were included among the "true barons" of the realm from around 1220.

== List of Masters of the Horse ==
- Ladislaus I Kán (1217-1222)
- Denis Tomaj (1222-1224)
- Mihály Bana (1225 and 1231–35)
- Denis Türje (1235–41)
- William of Saint-Omer (1241–42)
- Stephen I Gutkeled (1242–45)
- Csák I Hahót (1245–48)
- Ernye Ákos (1248–51)
- Mojs II (1251–56)
- Lawrence, son of Kemény (1257–60)
- Herrand Héder (1260–70)
- Albert Ákos (1270-1272)
- Nicholas Monoszló (1272-1272)
- Ugrin Csák (1272-1273)
- Herbord Osl (1273-1274)
- Peter Aba (1274-1279)
- Unknown (1279-1279)
- Apor Péc (1280)
- Roland II Rátót (1283)
- James Borsa (1284-1285)
- John Csák (1290)
- Mikó Szécs (1291)
- Thomas III Hont-Pázmány (1293)
- Matthew III Csák (1293-1296)
- John Csák (1297)
- Kakas Rátót (1303)
- John Aba (?-?)
- John Kőszegi (1311-1314)
- Peter III Csák (1314-1317)
- Nicholas II Kőszegi (1318-1321)
- Balázs Fónyi (1323 – 1326)
- Stephen I Lackfi (1326 – 1343)
- Dénes Lackfi (1343 – 1359)
- Imre Lackfi (1359 – 1367)
- Stephen II Lackfi (1368 – 1395) (with interruptions)
- John III Kórógyi (1395–1396)
- Miklós Perényi I (until 1420)
- Miklós Perényi II (1420-28)
- Ladislaus Hunyadi (1456-1457)
- Nicholas Pető (1457-?)
- Ladislaus Kanizsai (1464-1467)
- John II Ernuszt (1493-1505)
- György Báthory (1505-1524)
- Márk Dubraviczky (1524-1527)
- Péter Erdődy (1535- 1545)
- Ferenc Nyáry (1545-1553)
- Ferenc Tahy (1553-1573)
- László Bánffy (1574-1584)
- Ferenc Nádasdy (1587-1604)
- vacant (1604-1606)
- Szigfrid Kollonich (1606-1608)
- Ferenc Batthyány (1608-1625)
- Juraj V Zrinski (1625-1627)
- Miklós Zrínyi (1628-1664)
- Adam Zrinski (1666-1691)
- György Erdődy (1691-1693)
- Ferenc Kéry (1693-1700)

== See also ==
- Master of the Horse

== Sources ==
- Engel, Pál (2001). The Realm of St Stephen: A History of Medieval Hungary, 895–1526. I.B. Tauris Publishers. ISBN 1-86064-061-3.
- Fallenbüchl, Zoltán (1988). Magyarország főméltóságai ("High Dignitaries in Hungary") (in Hungarian). Maecenas Könyvkiadó. ISBN 963-02-5536-7.
- Stephen Werbőczy: The Customary Law of the Renowned Kingdom of Hungary in Three Parts (1517) (Edited and translated by János M. Bak, Péter Banyó and Martyn Rady with an introductory study by László Péter) (2005). Charles Schlacks, Jr. Publishers. ISBN 1-884445-40-3.
