= Mikod Kökényesradnót =

Hungarian nobleman

Mikod (II) Kökényesradnót

Ban of Severin
- Reign: 1275–1276
- Predecessor: Paul Gutkeled
- Successor: Ugrin Csák
- Died: 1298
- Noble family: gens Kökényesradnót
- Issue: Nicholas Dobokai; Demetrius; Peter Bogáti; Elizabeth
- Father: Mikod I

Mikod (II) from the kindred Kökényesradnót (Hungarian: Kökényesradnót nembeli (II.) Mikod; died 1298) was a Hungarian baron and soldier in the second half of the 13th century. He served as Ban of Severin from 1275 to 1276.

He was a staunch supporter of Stephen V of Hungary. He acquired several landholdings in Transylvania due to his military and political service since the 1250s. The influential Dobokai family ascended from him.

== Family ==
Mikod (also Mikud or Mykud) was born into the gens (clan) Kökényesradnót, which initially possessed landholdings in the southeastern part of Nógrád County. According to the 14th-century Illuminated Chronicle, the ancestors of the kindred – Kökényes (Kyquin) and Radnót (Reynold) – were of Hispanic origin, who "came to Hungary with Queen Margaret, the wife of King Béla I of Hungary" in the 11th century. Whereas no such queen is known, the majority of historians considered that the two French or Spanish knights arrived to Hungary with Margaret of France, the second spouse of Béla III of Hungary in the 1180s.

Mikod (II) was the son of Mikod (I), whose activity is unknown. He also had a brother Emeric, who had a son John and a daughter Catherine, the wife of the influential lord Egidius Monoszló. Mikod had four children from his marriage with an unidentified noblewoman. The eldest one Nicholas was the ancestor of the Dobokai family, while the Bogátis descended from Peter. The third son Demetrius appeared in contemporary records in the period between 1297 and 1305. Mikod's only known daughter Elizabeth married John Aba from the Cente branch of the powerful clan.

== Military career ==
Two donation letters of King Ladislaus IV of Hungary, issued in June and July 1279, preserved details on Mikod's military service from the earlier decades. He participated in Béla IV's royal campaign against the Duchy of Austria in 1250, when the Hungarian monarch made a plundering raid into Austria and Styria in the summer of 1250, in retaliation of a former Austrian incursion into Hungary. Mikod fought during the siege of Kirchschlag in Lower Austria; his right leg was broken when the defenders threw a stone at him and his left leg was pierced with a spear before the king's eyes. Mikod also participated in the royal campaign in the summer of 1253, when King Béla IV launched a war against Ottokar II in Moravia. Béla sent Mikod to besiege and occupy the (now unidentified) castle of "Mynen", which laid along the northern border of Hungary. According to the narration, when Mikod and his soldiers, as part of the vanguard army, tried to break into the fort and to set his own flag inside, Ottokar's defenders severely injured his right hand and rib with a spear. For his loyal service, Mikod was granted the villages Lövő, Szepene and Bánd in Zala County.

By the early 1260s, both Mikod and Emeric Kökényesradnót were considered important partisans of Duke Stephen, King Béla's eldest son and heir, who administered his provinces in Styria, then Transylvania. The close confidential relationship is well indicated by that purchase, when Stephen paid Mikod the hefty sum of 100 silver marks for a single horse in 1269. Sometime before 1262, Mikod and Emeric were granted Szentmiklós in Torda County along the river Aranyos (Arieș) near Torda (present-day Turda, Romania) by Béla IV. The relationship between Béla IV and Stephen became tense by the beginning of 1261, because the latter accused his father of planning to disinherit him. After a brief skirmish, Stephen forced his father to cede all the lands of the Kingdom of Hungary to the east of the Danube to him and adopted the title of junior king in 1262. Thereafter, the Kökényesradnót brothers were also oriented in Transylvania, establishing a wealth there and roughly abandoning their inherited possessions in Transdanubia, which laid in senior king Béla's domain. Mikod was granted whole Doboka County around 1262, which he governed as perpetual count (or ispán) until 1268.

Despite the division of the country, the relationship of Béla and Stephen remained tense, which escalated into a civil war by the end of 1264, when Béla IV invaded his son's realm in two fronts. According to the aforementioned charter of Ladislaus IV from July 1279, both Mikod and Emeric took an active part in the fighting, are the only known persons who were present in all battles along the Transylvanian front. Stephen's army – involving Mikod and Emeric – stopped the advance of the royalist Hungarian–Cuman army at the Fortress of Déva (Deva, present-day Romania), where the invaders suffered a heavy defeat. Simultaneously, Béla IV launched another attack against Stephen's province in Northeast Hungary, while the Cuman vanguard was followed by an army of greater significance led by Lawrence, son of Kemény, which forced the younger king and his accompaniment to retreat to Feketehalom (Codlea, Romania) in the easternmost corner of Transylvania. Mikod and Emeric were among the few dozen defenders during the siege of Feketehalom at the turn of 1264 and 1265. After their victory in late January 1265, Stephen decided to march into the central parts of Hungary. Somewhere in the Tiszántúl around the second half of February 1265, Stephen's advancing army collided with another royal army commanded by Ernye Ákos, who sent a vanguard of Cuman warriors with its commander, chieftain Menk, which attacked the troops of Mikod and Emeric Kökényesradnót, which functioned as the vanguard for Stephen's army. The Kökényesradnót brothers routed the Cumans. Mikod and his brother also participated in the subsequent main battle, where Stephen defeated Ernye's army. Subsequently, both of them took part in the decisive Battle of Isaszeg in early March 1265, which resulted Stephen's victory and end of the brief civil war. During the skirmish, Mikod suffered life-threatening injuries. Whether Stephen subsequently occupied the castle of Buda is uncertain and subject to historical debate, nevertheless an undated charter refers to Mikod as "Mykud comes, rector castri Budensis", which suggests he was temporarily installed as rector of Buda after the civil war, succeeding Henry Preussel, who was executed after the Battle of Isaszeg.

== Social ascension ==
Following the civil war, Mikod began to establish his wealth in Transylvania. Upon the request of his lord Stephen, he returned the perpetual county of Doboka to the duke around 1268. As a compensation, he was granted the village Bálványos (today Unguraș, Romania) and its namesake castle with a surrounding settlement called Németi and its accessories in the same county in 1269. Béla IV also donated Koppánd and Ivánkatelke (today Copand and Căptălan, respectively, Romania) along the river Maros (Mureș) to Mikod and Emeric in the same year. Shortly after his ascension to the Hungarian throne in 1270, Stephen confirmed the former land donations of his father and himself to the Kökényesradnót brothers in his royal charter. The document confirms that, beside the aforementioned settlements, Mikod and Emeric were the owners of Jenő (today Fundătura, Romania) in Doboka County (also a former donation from Stephen). Because of their loyal service and "heroic" involvement in the civil war, Mikod and Emeric were granted large-scale donations in Transylvania, altogether 13 known possessions in four counties, including two former royal fortresses by Stephen V. The brothers were granted surrounding estates and villages near Doboka Castle – today all belongs to Doboka (Dăbâca, Romania) – and an uninhabited land Lózsárd (Lujerdiu), in addition to another estates along the Aranyos river, Kerekegyház, Igrictelek and Mészkő (Cheia) near Torda.

Ladislaus IV emphasized in his two charters issued in 1279 that "during the turmoil" (i.e. the 1272–1277 internal conflict) in Hungary "[...] he [Mikod] never inflicted any damage [...]", and kept himself away from internal struggles. Nevertheless, Mikod remained a close ally of those barons, who once were considered confidants of the late Stephen V and consisted one of the two rivaling baronial groups during the 1270s civil war. For instance, he acted as co-judge beside Matthew Csák, Voivode of Transylvania in November 1274, as one of the influential members of the local elite in the province. He was styled as ispán of Doboka County in this occasion. When the Csáks regain power by the last months of 1275, Mikod served as Ban of Severin from around December 1275 to 1276. Around the same time, Mikod built his fort, Torda Castle in Aranyos Valley, to the west of the namesake town on the border of his estates (Szentmiklós, Kerekegyház, Igrictelek and Mészkő). However, during the Second Mongol invasion of Hungary in the winter of 1285 and 1286, the invader Mongols seized and destroyed the fort. The "guests" (hospes) of Torda salt mine complained that their letters of privileges also burned and perished during the attack. Sometime between 1268 and 1298, Mikod established a monastery at Sáp along the river Zagyva in the border between Nógrád and Heves counties. Beside his acquiring efforts in Transylvania, Mikod remained a prominent landowner in Nógrád County too. For instance, he owned Mikod-Hatvana (today Palotás) in 1283.

Emeric died sometime in 1285 or 1286. In accordance with his will, Mikod and his nephew John divided their estates at Koppánd and Ivántelke in March 1286, and Mikod allowed his nephew to donate his late brother's portions to the cathedral chapter of Transylvania for the latter's spiritual salvation in that year. According to a document from March 1288, their father Mikod I once willed his sons, Mikod II and Emeric obliging them to make a pilgrimage to the Holy Land. Due to political circumstances and lack of wealth, the brothers could not fulfill this wish. In 1279 or 1280, papal legate Philip, Bishop of Fermo excused them from the oath in exchange for paying 50 silver marks for one of the churches. This vow has also not been fulfilled until Emeric's death. Unable to pay the summon, Mikod donated his land Szentmiklós to Peter Monoszló, Bishop of Transylvania in order to finance the re-construction of the St. Michael's Cathedral in March 1288. He also requested Ladislaus IV to confirm the donation; consequently he acknowledged the king's supremacy despite the chaotic situation in Hungary and Ladislaus' complete political isolation by that time. Mikod pledged a portion of his village Nagyfalu in Baranya County to his "relatives" Julius and Peter Kán in March 1294 for 50 silver marks with a redemption period of seven months. Mikod and his sons, Nicholas, Demetrius and Peter sold the family estate at Jobostelke in Alsó-Fehér County for 29 silver marks in 1297. Mikod was referred to as patron of the Premonstratensian monastery of Garáb in 1281 and in early 1298. In the same year, he and his sons exchanged Szentkirály (Sâncrai) and Szászlóna (Luna de Sus) for Marosújvár (Ocna Mureș), a nearby village called Faludi and the tithes of three villages with Peter Monoszló. The Kökényesradnóts and the bishop also concluded a mutual defense agreement with each other. The elderly Mikod fell ill in 1298. On his deathbed, he compiled his last will and testament before the representatives of the collegiate chapter of Buda. He bequeathed his estates Jenő and Csobolyó to his daughter Elizabeth and son-in-law John Cente.

== Sources ==
- F. Romhányi, Beatrix (2000). Kolostorok és társaskáptalanok a középkori Magyarországon: Katalógus [Monasteries and Collegiate Chapters in Medieval Hungary: A Catalogue] (in Hungarian). Pytheas. ISBN 963-7483-07-1.
- Karácsonyi, János (1901). A magyar nemzetségek a XIV. század közepéig. II. kötet [The Hungarian genera until the middle of the 14th century, Vol. 2] (in Hungarian). Hungarian Academy of Sciences.
- Kristó, Gyula, ed. (2000). Középkori históriák oklevelekben (1002–1410) [Medieval Stories in Charters (1002–1410)] (in Hungarian). Szegedi Középkorász Műhely. ISBN 963-482-423-4.
- Kubinyi, András (2009). Tanulmányok Budapest középkori történetéről, I. kötet [Studies on the Medieval History of Budapest, Vol. 1.] (in Hungarian). Várostörténeti Tanulmányok 11/1, Budapest Főváros Levéltára. ISBN 978-963-7323-65-2.
- Sălăgean, Tudor (2016). Transylvania in the Second Half of the Thirteenth Century: The Rise of the Congregational System. East Central and Eastern Europe in the Middle Ages 450–1450. Vol. 37. Leiden and Boston: Brill. ISBN 978-90-04-24362-0.
- Szőcs, Tibor (2010). "Egy második "tatárjárás"? A tatár–magyar kapcsolatok a XIII. század második felében [A Second Tartar Invasion? The Tartar–Hungarian Relations in the Second Half of the 13th Century]". Belvedere Meridionale (in Hungarian). 22 (3–4): 16–49. ISSN 1419-0222.
- Zsoldos, Attila (2007). Családi ügy: IV. Béla és István ifjabb király viszálya az 1260-as években [A family affair: The Conflict between Béla IV and Junior King Stephen in the 1260s] (in Hungarian). História, MTA Történettudományi Intézete. ISBN 978-963-9627-15-4.
- Zsoldos, Attila (2011). Magyarország világi archontológiája, 1000–1301 [Secular Archontology of Hungary, 1000–1301] (in Hungarian). História, MTA Történettudományi Intézete. ISBN 978-963-9627-38-3.

Mikod II Genus Kökényesradnót Born: ? Died: 1298
Political offices
Preceded by Paul Gutkeled	Ban of Severin; 1275–1276	Succeeded by Ugrin Csák
