= Demetrius Rosd =

Hungarian nobleman

Demetrius (I) Rosd

Ispán of Szatmár
- Reign: 1272
- Predecessor: unknown
- Successor: Ernye Ákos
- Died: after 1278
- Noble family: gens Rosd
- Father: Andrew (Endre)

Demetrius (I) from the kindred Rosd (Hungarian: Rosd nembeli (I.) Demeter; died after 1278) was a Hungarian nobleman and soldier in the second half of the 13th century. He served as ispán of Kraszna, Szatmár counties and the royal lordship of Telegd (today Tileagd, Romania) in 1272.

== Ancestry ==
Demetrius was born into an ancient Hungarian kindred, the gens (clan) Rosd as the son of Andrew (or Endre). He had a younger brother Michael the Small. Throughout their lives, they worked closely together on wealth acquisition and political involvement. The kindred possessed landholdings and villages in Rosd Island on the Danube (present-day known as Szentendre Island), in addition along the nearby opposite shoreline of the river on the eastern edge of Pilis royal forest. Demetrius lived in a manor in the village Tah.

== Career ==
The political and social rise of the brothers was made possible by a dynastic conflict that escalated into a civil war. The relationship between King Béla IV and his eldest son Stephen became tense by the early 1260s. After a brief skirmish, Stephen forced his father to cede all the lands of the Kingdom of Hungary to the east of the Danube to him and adopted the title of junior king in 1262. The landholdings of the Rosd clan came into the border zone of the two emerging domains. Both Demetrius and Michael joined Stephen's retinue, connecting their fate, fortune and social ascendancy to the power aspirations of the younger king. Both Demetrius and Michael left behind their possessions in Central Hungary in order to serve Duke Stephen in his realm. By the autumn of 1264, both parties prepared for war. While Demetrius joined Stephen's army in Transylvania, Michael remained in the castle of Füzér in order to protect from Béla's forces. When the royal army invaded Stephen's realm in December 1264, Demetrius participated in the initial battle near Déva (Deva, present-day Romania). Béla's advancing army, commanded by Lawrence, son of Kemény forced Stephen to retreat as far as the castle at Feketehalom (Codlea, Romania) in the easternmost corner of Transylvania. Demetrius was among the few dozen defenders during the siege of Feketehalom at the turn of 1264 and 1265. The attackers kept the younger king's forces under constant pressure and it is plausible that the defenders soon exhausted their reserves. As a result, Stephen intended to send his special envoy Demetrius Rosd to his parents, Béla and Maria, in order to seek mercy, but the besiegers captured him and Lawrence tortured the prisoner. After Stephen's victory at Feketehalom due to the arrival of the rescue army, Demetrius was freed from captivity. Along with his brother Michael, he participated in the subsequent battle somewhere in Tiszántúl against Ernye Ákos' army in the second half of February 1265. They were also present in the decisive Battle of Isaszeg in early March 1265.

After the reconciliation between Béla and Stephen in 1266, Demetrius was delegated by the younger king to the restored national joint judicial courts composed of the partisans of the two monarchs. Shortly before Stephen V ascended the Hungarian throne in 1270, the younger king generously rewarded his faithful partisans, including the Rosd brothers, Demetrius and Michael, who were granted Füzér Castle and its lordship, altogether eleven villages, including Füzér, Komlós, Nyíri, Kajata and Telki in Abaúj County. Stephen – now as king of whole Hungary – confirmed these land donations in February 1272. Demetrius also owned a portion in Szada in Zemplén County. He donated the estate to his faithful servants in 1278. Demetrius and Michael also received the right of patronage over the Cistercian Klostermarienberg Abbey (Borsmonostor, today part of Mannersdorf an der Rabnitz, Austria) sometime around 1270. Demetrius was styled as ispán of Kraszna and Szatmár counties in June 1272, shortly before the tragic events which led to Stephen's death. Demetrius was also referred to as ispán of Telegd which occasional title does not appear in the sources before nor after. Sometime in 1274 or 1275, during the first phase of the feudal anarchy, Demetrius and Michael was temporarily deprived from the right of patronage over Borsmonostor in favor of Lawrence Aba. However, they regained the right by Ladislaus IV in November 1277, again dismissing Lawrence Aba from this position. Demetrius died after 1278. He had no known wives nor descendants.

== Sources ==
- Karácsonyi, János (1901). A magyar nemzetségek a XIV. század közepéig. III. kötet [The Hungarian genera until the middle of the 14th century, Vol. 3] (in Hungarian). Hungarian Academy of Sciences.
- Szűcs, Jenő (2002). Az utolsó Árpádok [The Last Árpáds] (in Hungarian). Osiris Kiadó. ISBN 963-389-271-6.
- Zsoldos, Attila (2007). Családi ügy: IV. Béla és István ifjabb király viszálya az 1260-as években [A family affair: The Conflict between Béla IV and Junior King Stephen in the 1260s] (in Hungarian). História, MTA Történettudományi Intézete. ISBN 978-963-9627-15-4.
- Zsoldos, Attila (2011). Magyarország világi archontológiája, 1000–1301 [Secular Archontology of Hungary, 1000–1301] (in Hungarian). História, MTA Történettudományi Intézete. ISBN 978-963-9627-38-3.
