= Emeric Kökényesradnót =

Hungarian nobleman

Cup-bearer of the Queen's Court
- Reign: 1281
- Predecessor: Conrad Szák (1240)
- Successor: Andrew (1290)
- Died: 1285 or 1286
- Noble family: gens Kökényesradnót
- Issue: John; Catherine
- Father: Mikod I

Emeric from the kindred Kökényesradnót (Hungarian: Kökényesradnót nembeli Imre; died 1285 or 1286) was a Hungarian baron and soldier in the second half of the 13th century.

== Family ==
Emeric was born into the gens (clan) Kökényesradnót, as the son of Mikod (I), whose activity is unknown. He also had an elder brother Mikod (II), whose political ambitions he supported for the rest of his life. Emeric had a son John, who died without descendants by the end of the 13th century. His daughter Catherine married Egidius Monoszló, an influential baron of the 1270s.

== Career ==
By the early 1260s, both Mikod and Emeric Kökényesradnót were considered important partisans of Duke Stephen, King Béla's eldest son and heir, who administered his provinces in Styria, then Transylvania. Sometime before 1262, Mikod and Emeric were granted Szentmiklós in Torda County along the river Aranyos (Arieș) near Torda (present-day Turda, Romania) by Béla IV. The relationship between Béla IV and Stephen became tense by the beginning of 1261, because the latter accused his father of planning to disinherit him. After a brief skirmish, Stephen forced his father to cede all the lands of the Kingdom of Hungary to the east of the Danube to him and adopted the title of junior king in 1262. Thereafter, the Kökényesradnót brothers were also oriented in Transylvania, establishing a wealth there and roughly abandoning their inherited possessions in Transdanubia, which laid in senior king Béla's domain. The wedding of Catherine Kökényesradnót and Egidius Monoszló also meant a political alliance among Duke Stephen's partisans.

Despite the division of the country, the relationship of Béla and Stephen remained tense, which escalated into a civil war by the end of 1264, when Béla IV invaded his son's realm in two fronts. According to a royal charter of Ladislaus IV from July 1279, both Mikod and Emeric took an active part in the fighting, are the only known persons who were present in all battles along the Transylvanian front. Stephen's army – involving Mikod and Emeric – stopped the advance of the royalist Hungarian–Cuman army at the Fortress of Déva (Deva, present-day Romania), where the invaders suffered a heavy defeat. Simultaneously, Béla IV launched another attack against Stephen's province in Northeast Hungary, while the Cuman vanguard was followed by an army of greater significance led by Lawrence, son of Kemény, which forced the younger king and his accompaniment to retreat to Feketehalom (Codlea, Romania) in the easternmost corner of Transylvania. Mikod and Emeric were among the few dozen defenders during the siege of Feketehalom at the turn of 1264 and 1265. After their victory in late January 1265, Stephen decided to march into the central parts of Hungary. Somewhere in the Tiszántúl around the second half of February 1265, Stephen's advancing army collided with another royal army commanded by Ernye Ákos, who sent a vanguard of Cuman warriors with its commander, chieftain Menk, which attacked the troops of Mikod and Emeric Kökényesradnót, which functioned as the vanguard for Stephen's army. The Kökényesradnót brothers routed the Cumans. Mikod and Emeric also participated in the subsequent main battle, where Stephen defeated Ernye's army. Subsequently, both of them took part in the decisive Battle of Isaszeg in early March 1265, which resulted Stephen's victory and end of the brief civil war.

Following the civil war, Béla IV donated Koppánd and Ivánkatelke (today Copand and Căptălan, respectively, Romania) along the river Maros (Mureș) to Mikod and Emeric in 1269. Shortly after his ascension to the Hungarian throne in 1270, Stephen V confirmed the former land donations of his father and himself to the Kökényesradnót brothers in his royal charter. The document confirms that, beside the aforementioned settlements, Mikod and Emeric were the owners of Jenő (today Fundătura, Romania) in Doboka County (also a former donation from Stephen). Because of their loyal service and "heroic" involvement in the civil war, Mikod and Emeric were granted large-scale donations in Transylvania, altogether 13 known possessions in four counties, including two former royal fortresses by Stephen V. The brothers were granted surrounding estates and villages near Doboka Castle – today all belongs to Doboka (Dăbâca, Romania) – and an uninhabited land Lózsárd (Lujerdiu), in addition to another estates along the Aranyos river, Kerekegyház, Igrictelek and Mészkő (Cheia) near Torda.

Emeric was referred to as cup-bearer of the court of Queen consort Isabella and ispán of Bánya (Árkibánya) ispánate, which laid in the territory of Nyitra County, in 1281. Both Mikod and Emeric were patrons of the Premonstratensian monastery of Garáb in that year. Emeric died sometime in 1285 or 1286. In accordance with his will, Mikod and his nephew John (Emeric's son) divided their estates at Koppánd and Ivántelke in March 1286, and Mikod allowed his nephew to donate his late brother's portions to the cathedral chapter of Transylvania for the latter's spiritual salvation in that year. According to a document from March 1288, their father Mikod I once willed his sons, Mikod II and Emeric obliging them to make a pilgrimage to the Holy Land. Due to political circumstances and lack of wealth, the brothers could not fulfill this wish. In 1279 or 1280, papal legate Philip, Bishop of Fermo excused them from the oath in exchange for paying 50 silver marks for one of the churches. This vow has also not been fulfilled until Emeric's death.

== Sources ==
- Karácsonyi, János (1901). A magyar nemzetségek a XIV. század közepéig. II. kötet [The Hungarian genera until the middle of the 14th century, Vol. 2] (in Hungarian). Hungarian Academy of Sciences.
- Kristó, Gyula, ed. (2000). Középkori históriák oklevelekben (1002–1410) [Medieval Stories in Charters (1002–1410)] (in Hungarian). Szegedi Középkorász Műhely. ISBN 963-482-423-4.
- Zsoldos, Attila (2007). Családi ügy: IV. Béla és István ifjabb király viszálya az 1260-as években [A family affair: The Conflict between Béla IV and Junior King Stephen in the 1260s] (in Hungarian). História, MTA Történettudományi Intézete. ISBN 978-963-9627-15-4.
- Zsoldos, Attila (2011). Magyarország világi archontológiája, 1000–1301 [Secular Archontology of Hungary, 1000–1301] (in Hungarian). História, MTA Történettudományi Intézete. ISBN 978-963-9627-38-3.
