= Henry Preussel =

- judex pro domino rege in Buda

Rector of Buda
- Reign: 1264–1265
- Predecessor: Peter (villicus)
- Successor: Walter
- Died: March 1265; Isaszeg, Hungary

Henry Preussel, also Preuscilinus (German: Heinrich Preussel, Hungarian: Preussel Henrik; died March 1265) was an Austrian knight in the Kingdom of Hungary, a faithful confidant of King Béla IV. Henry served as the first rector of Buda from 1264 until his death.

== Life ==
Henry Preussel participated in Frederick the Quarrelsome's campaigns against the Kingdom of Hungary, still as an opponent to Béla IV, however later entered the service of the Hungarian king. He was already belonged to the entourage of the Hungarian king in the Battle of Kressenbrunn in 1260. He especially enjoyed the confidence of Queen Maria, however the King's eldest son, the rebellious Duke Stephen considered Henry as his "mortal enemy" and also excluded him from the Peace of Pressburg in November 1262, which contained the division of the kingdom between Béla IV and Stephen following a short war. Henry was the ispán of Bars County in 1264.

The reconciliation of Stephen and his father proved to be only temporary around 1263–1264, and the increasing tensions improved the military strategic importance of the Buda Castle, which was recently built by Béla IV. The King decided to suspend the town privileges of Buda, including the free election of the burghers' magistrate. As a result, Béla IV dismissed villicus Peter after 11 September 1264 and appointed Henry Preussel as the first rector of Buda, perhaps under Lombard influence. Henry became commander and castellan of the fortress, while also had judicial function over the citizens.

Preussel participated in the civil war against Duke Stephen. Following the defeat of Ernye Ákos' army in February 1265, Stephen launched a counter-offensive, crossing the Danube. Queen Mary sent Preussel with 1,000 auxiliary troops to increase Béla's royal army. He was one of the commanders alongside Henry Kőszegi and Béla, Duke of Macsó. Stephen gained a decisive victory over his father's army in the Battle of Isaszeg in March 1265. Henry Preussel was captured alive following the battle, however he was executed shortly afterwards. According to Jans der Enikel's Weltchronik, Preussel was stabbed with a sword himself by Duke Stephen, while the Austrian knight begged for his life. Following his victory, Stephen also seized Buda for a short time, but soon the castle and the town came under the authority of Béla IV again. Henry Preussel was succeeded by rector Walter.

His brother was Wernhard, who joined the allegiance of Ottokar II of Bohemia in 1260 and died sometime between 1265 and 1267.

== Sources ==
- Bácsatyai, Dániel (2020). "IV. Béla és István ifjabb király belháborújának időrendje [The Chronology of the Civil War between King Béla IV and Younger King Stephen]". Századok (in Hungarian). 154 (5). Magyar Történelmi Társulat: 1047–1082. ISSN 0039-8098.
- Kubinyi, András (1961). "Buda város pecséthasználatának kialakulása [Development of Usage of Seal in Buda]". Tanulmányok Budapest Múltjából. 14: 109–146.
- Zsoldos, Attila (2007). Családi ügy: IV. Béla és István ifjabb király viszálya az 1260-as években [A family affair: The Conflict between Béla IV and Junior King Stephen in the 1260s] (in Hungarian). História, MTA Történettudományi Intézete. ISBN 978-963-9627-15-4.
- Zsoldos, Attila (2011). Magyarország világi archontológiája, 1000–1301 [Secular Archontology of Hungary, 1000–1301] (in Hungarian). História, MTA Történettudományi Intézete. ISBN 978-963-9627-38-3.

Political offices
Preceded by Werner	Ispán of Bars; 1264	Succeeded by Denis
Preceded by Peter as villicus	Rector of Buda; 1264–1265	Succeeded by Walter
