= Mens =

Roman divine personification of thought, consciousness and mind

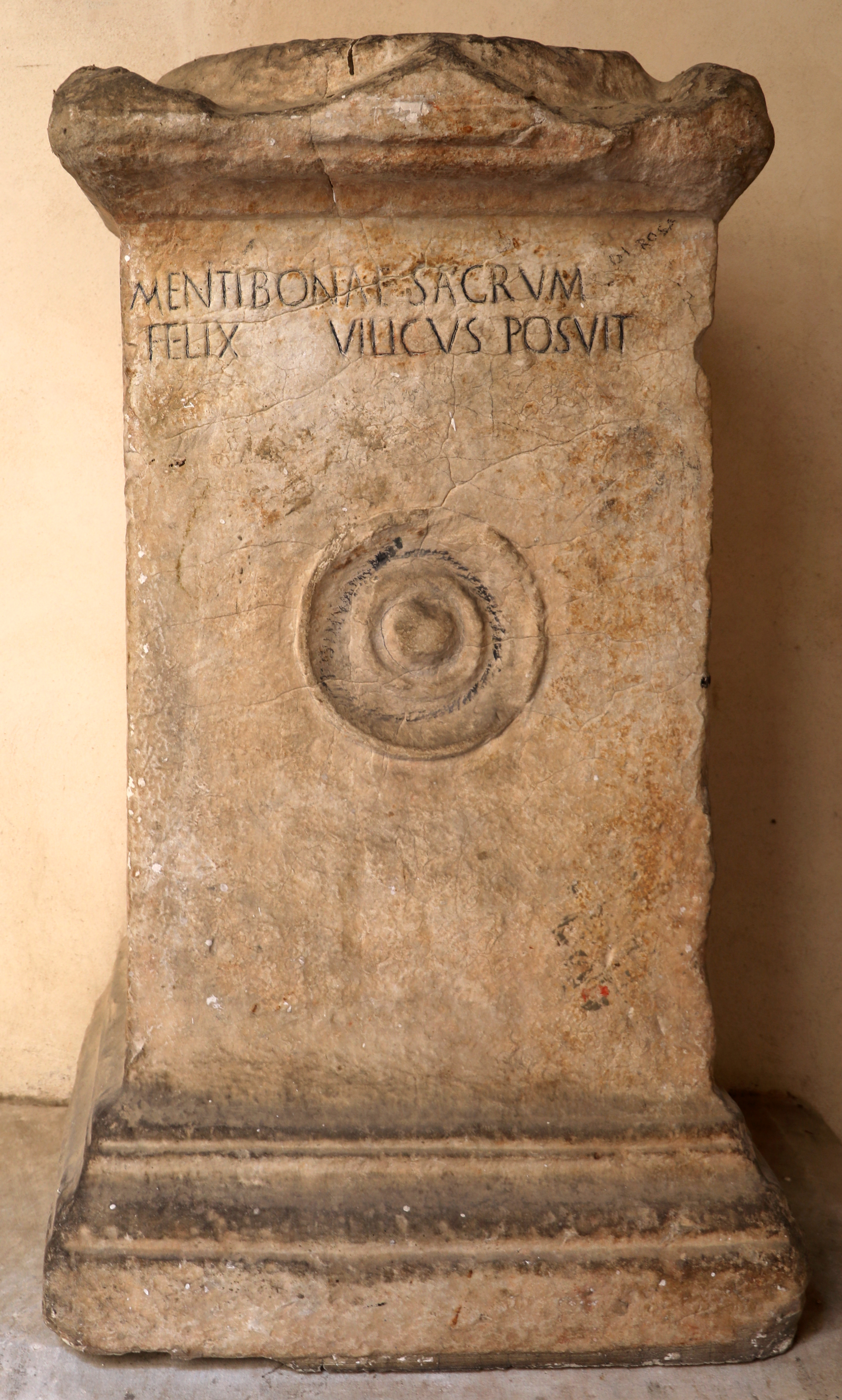
An altar dedicated to Bona Mens by a vilicus named Felix (Castello Malaspina)

In ancient Roman religion, Mens, also known as Mens Bona (Latin for "Good Mind"), was the personification of thought, consciousness and the mind, and also of "right-thinking". The founding (dies natalis) of her temple in Rome was celebrated on June 8. A temple on the Capitoline Hill in Rome was vowed to Mens in 217 BC on advice from the Sibylline Books, after the defeat of Lake Trasimene, and was dedicated in 215 BC.

== In Latin poetry ==
In Latin love elegy, Mens Bona is represented as a guardian against Desire (Cupido) and amorous pursuits. Propertius celebrated his escape from erotic bondage to his Cynthia by dedicating himself to the shrine of Mens Bona. Ovid depicted Cupid as leading Mens Bona as a captive in his triumphal parade.

== Legacy ==
The Latin word mens expresses the idea of "mind" and is the origin of English words like mental and dementia. The gifted-only organization Mensa International was originally to be named mens in the sense of "mind", but took instead the name Mensa (Latin: "table") to avoid ambiguity with "men's" in English and "mens" in other languages such as the Dutch language. In the Dutch vocabulary, "mens" is the word for "man" as in "mankind".

== See also ==
- Bona Dea
- Empedocles
- Pudicitia
