= Vilicus =

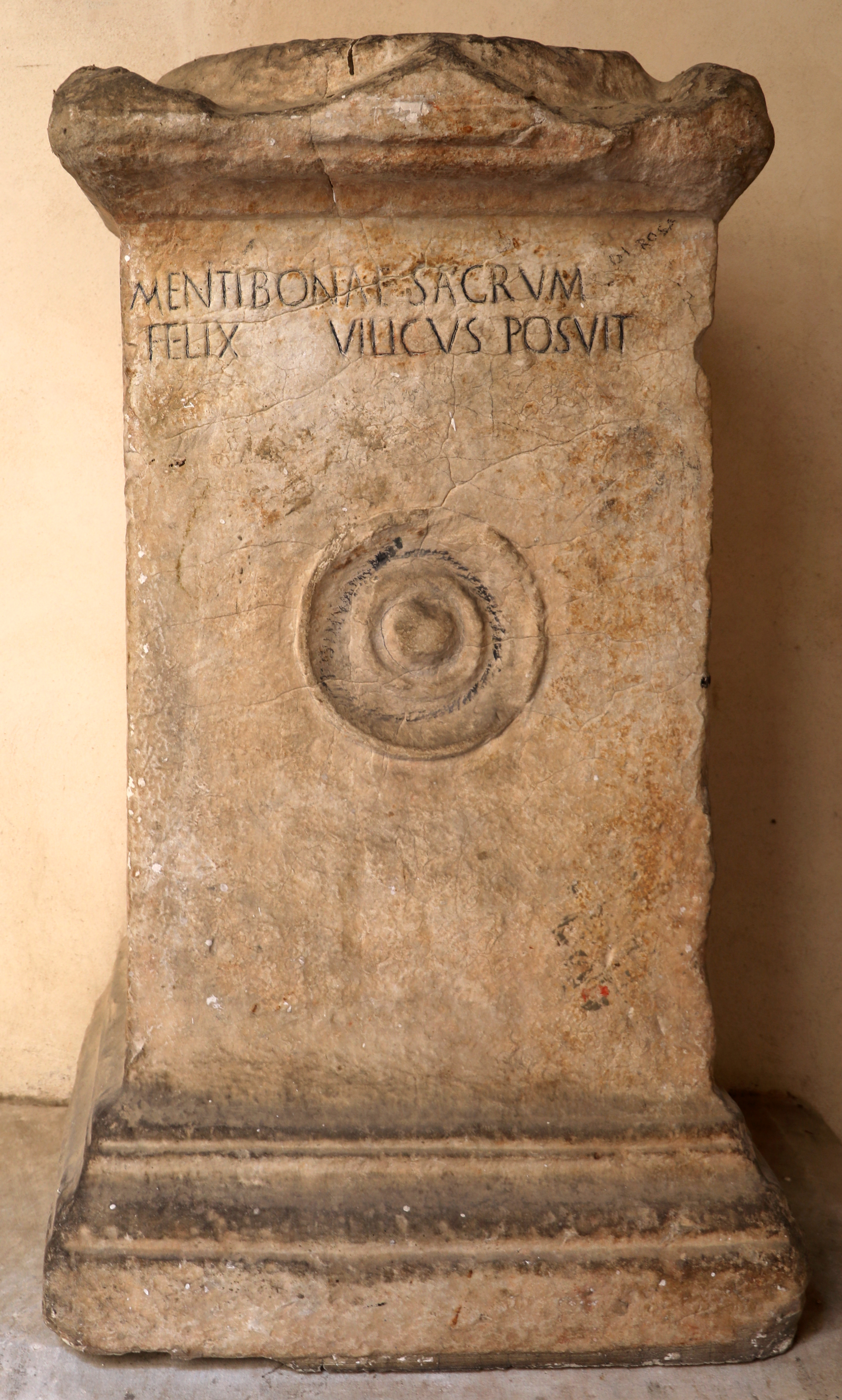
A vilicus named Felix dedicated this altar to Mens Bona, the goddess of good thinking (Castello Malaspina)

In ancient Rome, the vilicus (Greek: ἐπίτροπος, epitropos, or oikonomos) was a manager, supervisor, or overseer. Ausonius in 4th-century Bordeaux writes that his "pretentious" vilicus preferred to be called by the Greek title epitropos.

In the rural economy of early Rome, the vilicus was a bailiff or farm manager who directly oversaw agricultural labour on the villa rustica. As the Roman economy diversified, the title might be specified as vilicus rusticus for the traditional agricultural role. The vilicus hortorum ("of the gardens"), a foreman over the crews that maintained private or imperial gardens or parks in and around the city of Rome, may be seen as a transitional figure showing how the role would have evolved in an urban setting. By the turn of the 1st to the 2nd century AD, the vilicus urbanus can be found in various supervisory capacities; for example, building superintendent or rent-collector for a landlord, similar to an insularius, an apartment manager.

The vilicus managed slave labour and was most often a slave himself. As a slave, the vilicus would not have the right to a legal marriage, but it was thought appropriate and beneficial for him to enter into an enduring heterosexual union (contubernium) and raise a family.

The duties of the vilicus and those of his female counterpart (the vilica, only sometimes his wife) are described by Columella (Res rustica, I.8, XI.1, and XII.1), and by Cato (De Agri Cultura, cxlii–cxliii, focusing on the vilica; v on the vilicus). The vilica who supervised food preparation and textile production for the estate held her position on her own merit and only infrequently was the woman who lived with the vilicus as his wife.

The original duties of the vilicus were to follow the estate owner's instructions, and to govern the slaves with moderation, not to leave the villa except to go to market, to have no dealings with soothsayers, to take care of the cattle and the implements of husbandry, and to manage all the operations of the farm.

== See also ==
Slavery in ancient Rome
