= Füzér =

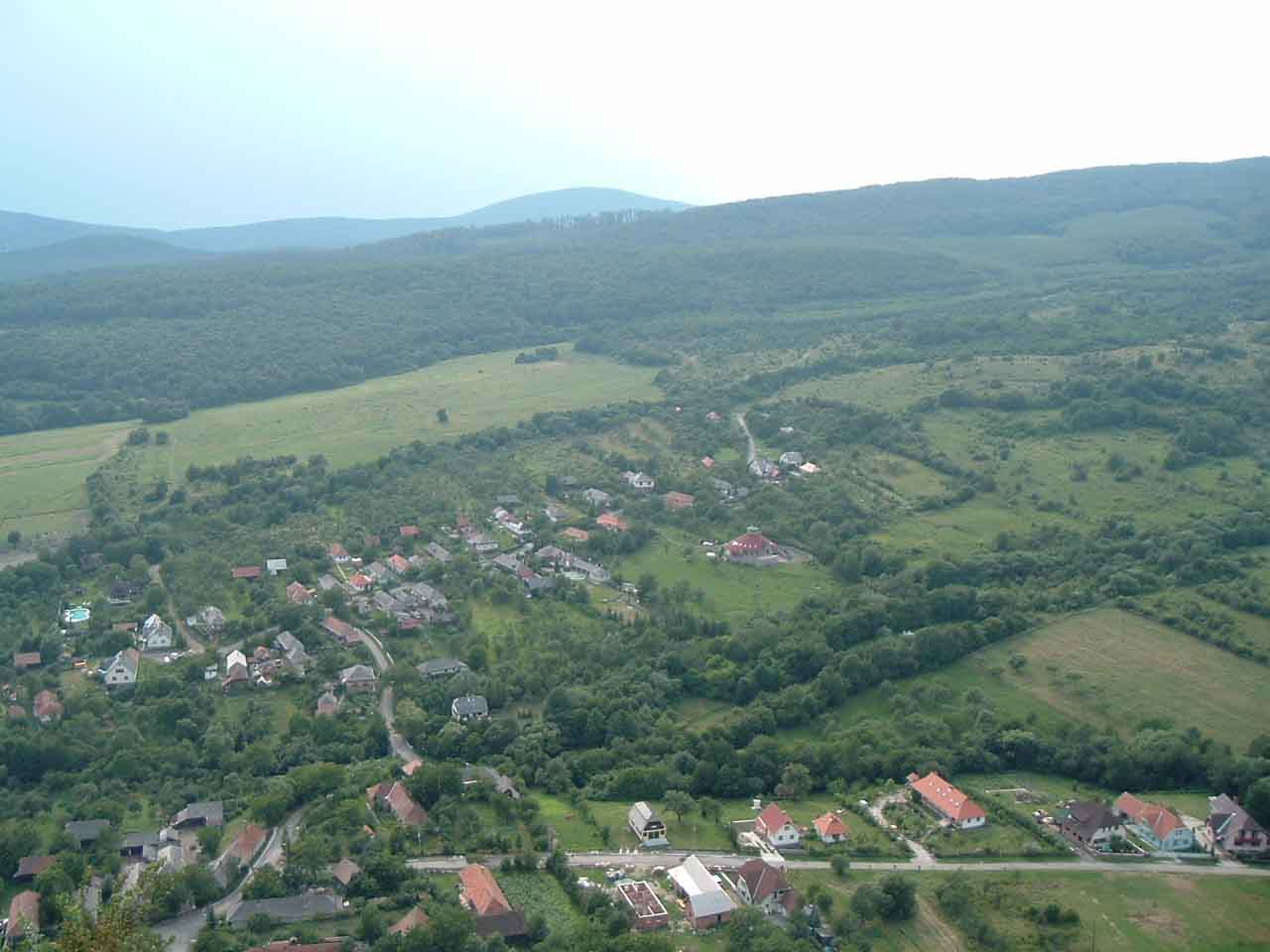

- Seal

- Location of Borsod-Abaúj-Zemplén county in Hungary

- Location of Füzér
- Coordinates: 48.53880°N 21.45517°E
- Country: Hungary
- County: Borsod-Abaúj-Zemplén

Area
  - Total: 37.53 km^{2} (14.49 sq mi)

Population (2004)
  - Total: 585
  - Density: 15.58/km^{2} (40.4/sq mi)
- Time zone: UTC+1 (CET)
  - Summer (DST): UTC+2 (CEST)
- Postal code: 3996
- Area code: 47

Füzér is a village in Borsod-Abaúj-Zemplén county, Hungary. It contains the northernmost point of Hungary.

The Castle of Füzér is located in this village. The castle was built in 1264 and was completely renovated in 2016. It is known for holding the Holy Crown of Hungary during the Ottoman invasion in the 16th century.

== Picture gallery ==
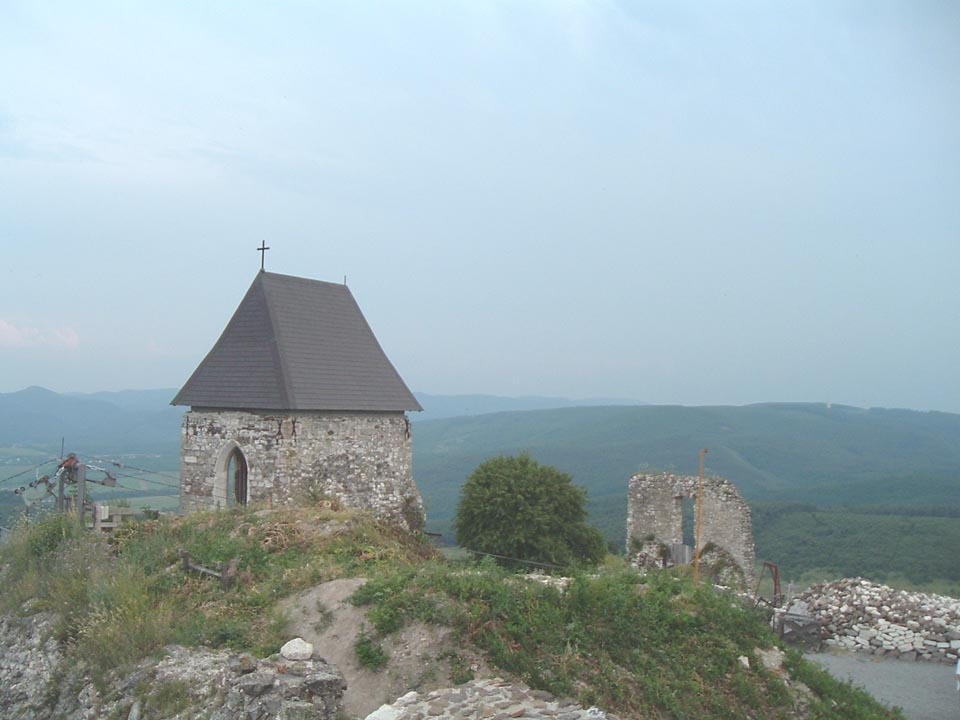

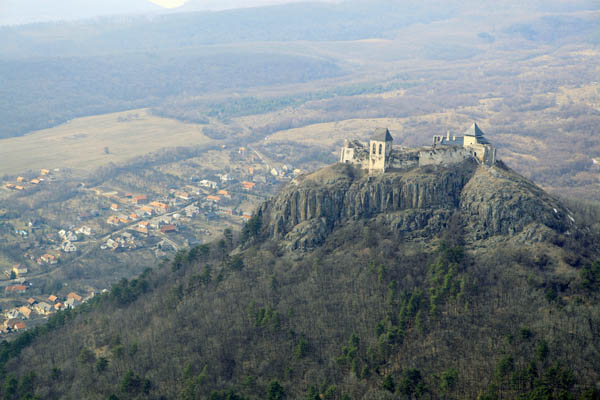

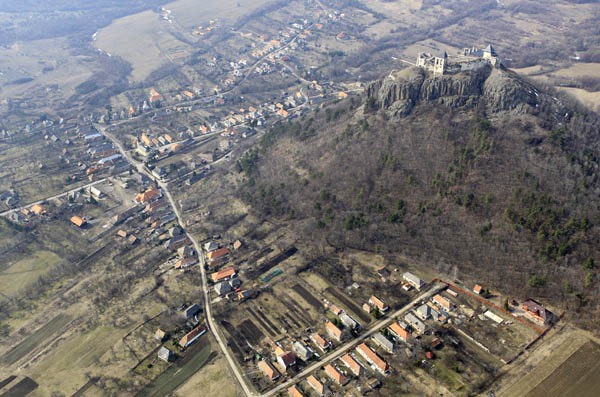

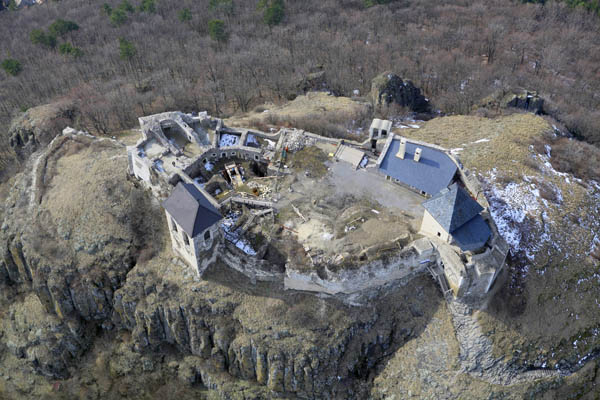

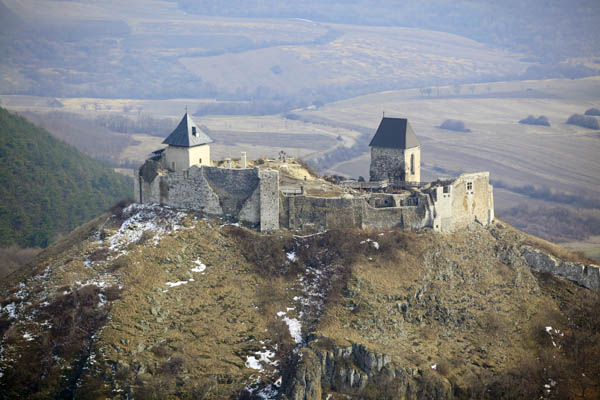

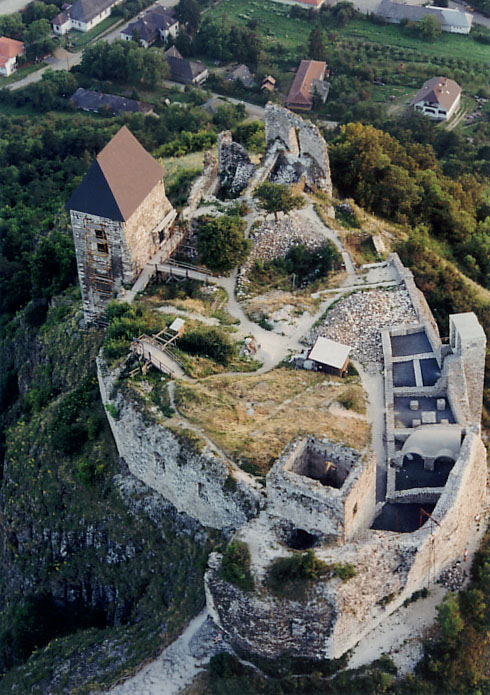
Aerial photograph: Füzér - castle

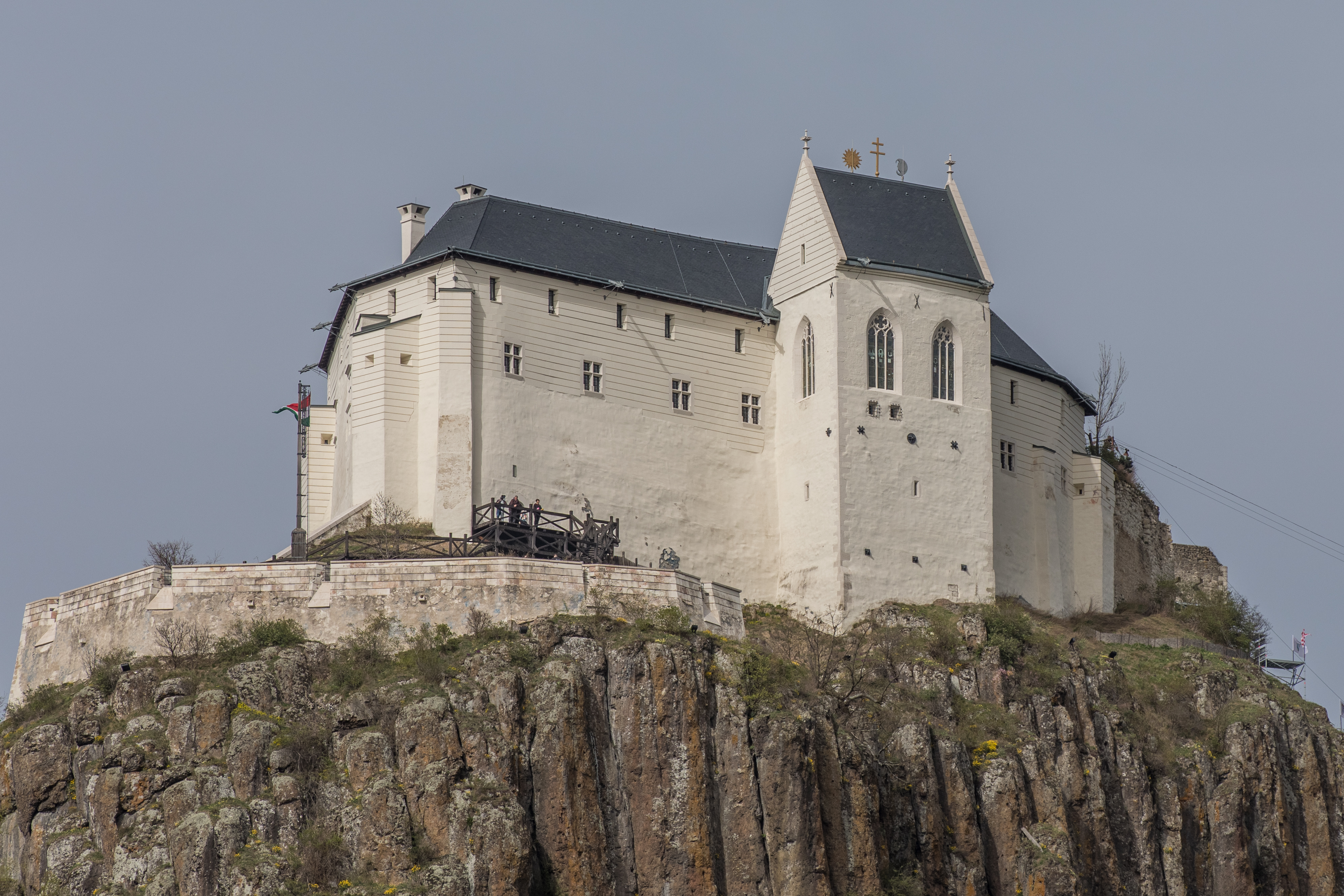
Füzér Castle in March 2024
