= Rector (politics) =

Political function in Rome and in medieval republics

Rectors and rectorates in politics and administration included:

== Roman ==
Rector provinciae was a Latin generic term for Roman governor, the governor of a Roman province, known after the time of Suetonius, and specifically a legal term (as used in the Codices of the Emperors Theodosius I and Justinian I) after Emperor Diocletian's Tetrarchy (when they came under the administrative authority of the Vicarius of a diocese and these under a Pretorian prefect), regardless of what their specific titles (of different rank, such as Consularis, Corrector provinciae, Praeses and Proconsul) may have been.

== Ragusa ==
A similar gubernatorial use or as chief magistrate existed in the Republic of Ragusa (presently Dubrovnik, Croatia), which was governed by a Rector (also used in the Italian form Rettore and the Slavonic equivalent Knez):

- 1358–1808, during the independence of the Ragusan Republic and two years after it was occupied by Napoleonic France in 1806.
- one more Rector, from 18 to 29 January 1814, was Count Sabo Đurđević (Savino de Giorgi), the last previous incumbent, during the short-lived liberation of the Republic, before the occupation by Austrian troops.

The seat of the rector was the Rector's Palace, Dubrovnik.

== Fiume ==
Primo Rettore, from 8 September 1920 to 29 December 1920, was the title of Gabriele D'Annunzio when he created the Italian Regency of Carnaro

== Other ==
- For the use of the style duke and rector of Burgundy by the Zähringer dynasty claimants to viceregal powers as Regent in the Kingdom of Burgundy within the Holy Roman Empire, see King of Burgundy#Rectorate of Burgundy
- Contemporary charters in Latin used a number of additional styles for the Danish king Cnut (Canute the Great, with Norway as his third realm; 23 April 1016 – 12 November 1035 in Britain) having rex Anglorum in the core plus various other titles, including rex Anglorum totiusque Brittannice orbis gubernator et rector i.e., 'king of the Angli and of all Britain governor and rector' (the last two in the generic sense 'ruler')
- In an early 12th-century oath to Ramon Berenguer III, Count of Barcelona, this ruler is referred to as rector catalanicus (as well as catalanicus heroes and dux catalanensis).
- Early governors of the duchy of Provence under Merovingian rule were called rector Provinciæ, praefectus or patricius unlike other parts of former Gaul, probably due to the deeper romanization of its population. After the rebellion of Maurontus and its defeat at the hands of Charles Martel, Provence particularism stops and is replaced by the classical frankish administrative structure with counts and dukes.
- The Comtat Venaissin in southern France was administered by a rector since it became a papal possession until 1790 (on 24 May its States-General (representative assembly) proclaimed a constitution, but remained loyal to the pope).
