= Battle of Isaszeg (1265) =

Medieval battle

Date	March 1265
Location	Isaszeg
Result	Victory of Duke Stephen

Belligerents
King Béla IV	Duke Stephen

Commanders and leaders
Béla of Macsó; Henry Kőszegi (POW); Henry Preussel (executed)	Duke Stephen; Peter Csák

The Battle of Isaszeg was fought between King Béla IV of Hungary and his son, Stephen, who served as Junior King and Duke of Transylvania. Stephen defeated his father's army in the subsequent peace Béla was obliged to cede the government of the Eastern parts of his kingdom again to his son.

On 23 March 1266, father and son confirmed the peace in the Convent of the Blessed Virgin on the Nyulak szigete ('Rabbits' Island').

== Sources ==
- Kristó, Gyula: Családja eredete, Csák Máté (Magyar história). Gondolat, 1983, Budapest. ISBN 963-281-736-2
- Zsoldos, Attila: Családi ügy - IV. Béla és István ifjabb király viszálya az 1260-as években (A Family Affair - The Conflict of Béla IV and Junior King Stephen in the 1260s); História - MTA Történettudományi Intézete, 2007, Budapest; ISBN 978-963-9627-15-4.
