= Tiszántúl =

Region in Eastern Europe

Tiszántúl, or Transtisza (literal meaning: "beyond [the] Tisza"), is a geographical region of which lies between the Tisza river, Hungary and the Apuseni Mountains, Romania, bordered by the Maros (Mureș) river. Alongside Kiskunság, it is a part of Great Alföld; however today, the denomination is mostly restricted to the area within Hungary, west of the present border with Romania.

It is mainly a flat area, being part of the Great Hungarian Plain. The area is divided by the tributaries of the Tisza: the Körös and Maros rivers. The largest city of the modern Transtisza area is Debrecen, other county seats being Nyíregyháza and Békéscsaba.
