= George Baksa =

- Lord of Sóvár

Ispán of Szabolcs
- Reign: 1300
- Born: c. 1250
- Died: after 1307
- Noble family: gens Baksa
- Spouse: Elizabeth N
- Issue: John I Sós; Peter I Sós
- Father: Simon I

George from the kindred Baksa (Hungarian: Baksa nembeli György; died after 1307) was a Hungarian lord and a distinguished military leader in the second half of the 13th century. He was a key supporter of Ladislaus IV of Hungary and participated in various military campaigns during his reign. He successfully fought against the Mongols in Hungary and Poland. After granting large-scale domains in Upper Hungary, he was also known as George of Sóvár or George the Salty (Hungarian: Sóvári "Sós" György, Polish: Jerzy z Sovaru) and became eponymous progenitor of the Sós (or Soós) de Sóvár noble family.

== Biography ==
=== Early life ===
George was born around 1250 into the widely extended gens (clan) Baksa, as one of the younger sons of Simon I, the ispán of the royal forest of Patak in 1262. He had five brothers, Baksa, Thomas III, Simon II, Denis and Derek, the ancestors of the Szerdahelyi, Sztritei, Csapi, Bocskai and Szécsi de Gálszécs noble families, respectively. He also had a sister, who married his familiaris, Thomas Sebesi. The Baksa clan, which had originated from the valley between the rivers Bodrog and Tisza, possessed villages and landholdings in Northeast Hungary, mainly Zemplén County. George married a noblewoman, a certain Elizabeth from an unidentified family. Their marriage produced two children, John I and Peter I, who adopted their surname and prefix after their father's nickname and stronghold. The later members of the Sós (or Soós) family, which still exists, descended from Peter.

The Baksa clan (Simon and his sons) supported Duke Stephen in the conflict with his father, King Béla IV of Hungary, as their lands laid in the territory of the rex junior after the division of the kingdom in the early 1260s. When the civil war between Béla and Stephen broke out in 1264, the royal army forced Stephen to retreat to Feketehalom (now Codlea, Romania). His courtier Thomas, and his brothers, including the young George, followed their lord and have found shelter in the fort. They were among those partisans, who relieved the castle, when Béla's army unsuccessfully besieged it.

=== King Ladislaus' military general ===
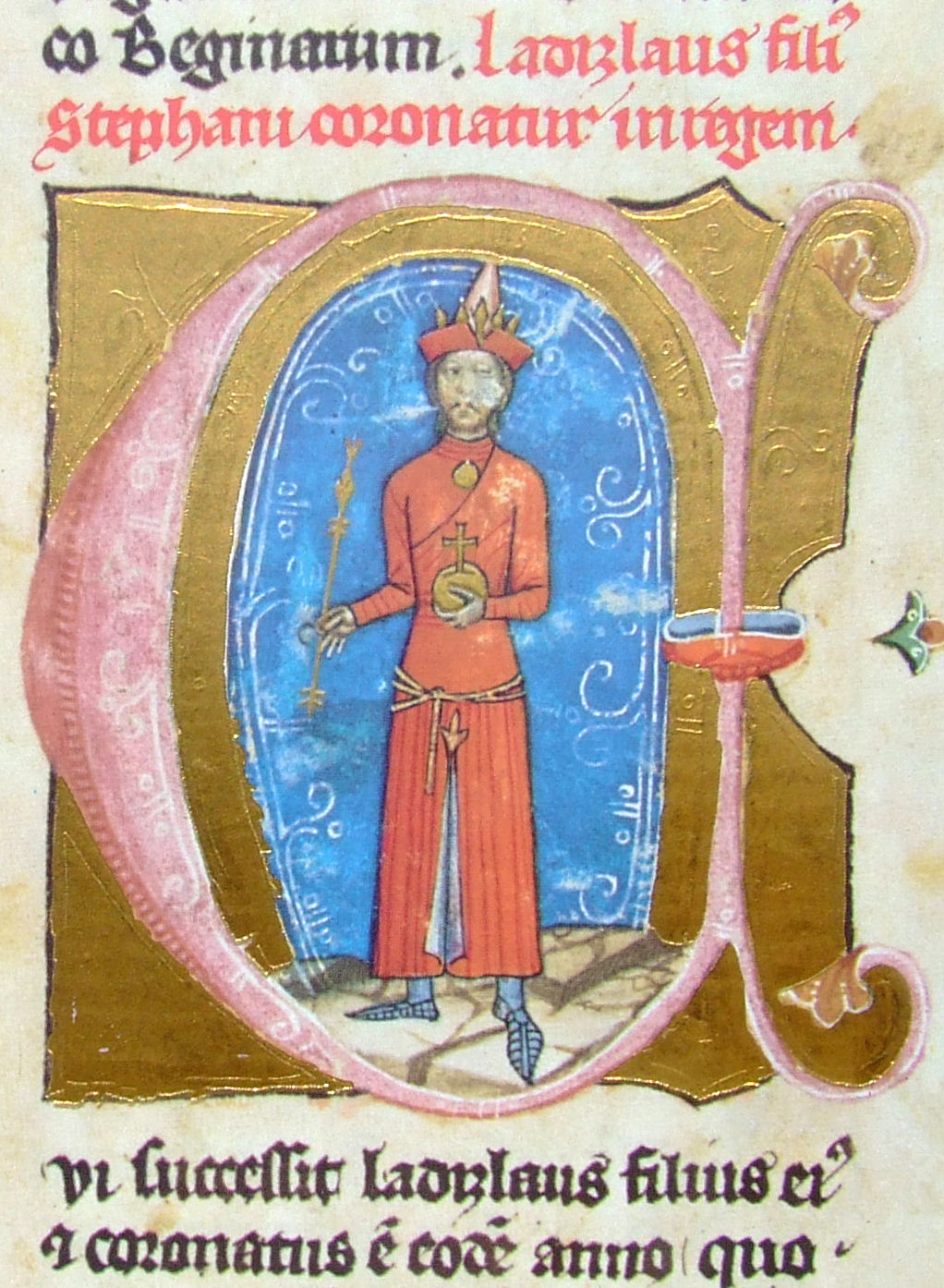
Ladislaus IV as depicted in the Illuminated Chronicle. Regardless of his controversial policy, George Baksa was considered a long-time supporter of his rule. He was among the last nobles, who left his allegiance

After a chaotic period of internal struggles, which characterized the minority rule of Ladislaus IV, the national diet, which convened in May 1277, declared Ladislaus to be of age and authorized the 15-year-old monarch to restore internal peace with all possible means. George Baksa emerged as a faithful and skilled military general of the king in that transition period, when Ladislaus IV made partial successes to strengthen the royal power. The king intended to eliminate the Geregyes' power in Bihar County and the surrounding region, who aspired to establish an oligarchic province independently of the monarch. Their relative, Roland, son of Mark ruled the territory through from Szepesség to Transylvania via Nyírség. King Ladislaus sent his two generals, Finta Aba and George Baksa, both of them were landowners in the nearby Upper Hungary, to defeat him. Roland was killed in a battle in the winter of 1277. Thereafter, George defeated and captured Geregye II, one of the Geregye brothers, in early 1278, who was later sentenced to death and decapitated. It is possible that George also participated in the successful siege of Nicholas Geregye's fortress at Adorján (now Adrian in Romania) in the first half of 1278; the Geregyes ultimately lost their influence and power. Following that, George joined Ladislaus' royal campaign with the alliance of Rudolf I of Germany against Ottokar II of Bohemia. The Hungarian–Cuman and Austrian reconnaissance armies sent on 18–19 August 1278, led by George Baksa and Berthold von Emersberg, respectively, caused a heavy loss to the Bohemian army, who besieged the castle of Laa. The Hungarian troops plundered the surrounding region, and George even captured three Austrian ministeriales during the clashes at the fort. After that, Ottokar abandoned the siege and marched southwards. George and his troops returned to the royal camp on 20 August. George participated in the Battle on the Marchfeld, took place on 26 August 1278, where Ottokar was killed. During the campaign, he captured altogether twelve Bohemian noblemen as hostages in exchange for ransom.

After his efficient service in the campaign against Ottokar, George Baksa already individually led royal troops against the king's enemies. In the period between 1278 and 1280, he had been sent against Litovoi, a powerful local Vlach voivode in northern Oltenia, who got involved in a war with the Hungarians over lands King Ladislaus claimed for the crown, but for which Litovoi refused to pay tribute. George led a punitive force against his territory; Litovoi was killed in battle, while his younger brother, Bărbat was taken prisoner and sent to the royal court by George Baksa. There he was forced not only to pay ransom but also to recognize Hungarian suzerainty. When the Holy See persuaded Ladislaus IV to enforce the Cuman laws, his favored subjects rebelled against him. Many Cumans decided to leave Hungary instead of obeying the legate's demands and the king could not hinder them from crossing the frontier. After the suppression of the revolt of Finta Aba, Ladislaus convened an assembly at the foot of the castle of Patak in July 1282 (today ruins near Sátoraljaújhely), where George Baksa and his brothers attended. When a Cuman army invaded the southern parts of Hungary in the following month, the Baksa brothers joined the king's punitive expedition. They participated in the Battle of Lake Hód (near present-day Hódmezővásárhely), took place sometime between 17 September and 21 October 1282, where Ladislaus vanquished the invaders's army. Two local warlords, brothers Darman and Kudelin had seized a former Hungarian banate, Braničevo. Stephen Dragutin invaded Braničevo with Hungarian assistance in the second half of 1284, but could not defeat them. The Hungarian auxiliary troops, consisted of Transylvanian and Cuman contingents, were led by George Baksa after a failed negotiation attempt between Ladislaus IV and Darman near the Hungarian–Serbian border. This was George's only known fruitless campaign in his military career.

Mongols in Hungary in 1285, depicted in the Illuminated Chronicle

The Mongols of the Golden Horde invaded Hungary under the command of Khans Talabuga and Nogai in the late winter of 1285. While Nogai stormed into Transylvania, Talabuga led his troops via Transcarpathia and directly threatened and plundered, among others, George Baksa's newly acquired lands and villages in Sáros and Zemplén counties, which laid along the border with the Kingdom of Galicia–Volhynia. According to Ladislaus' royal charter issued in 1288, George gathered his army and the auxiliary troops of his kinsfolk, companions and friends, and struggled with the invading Mongols repeatedly, "effectively and praiseworthy, as a testimony to the defense and loyalty of Our Crown". The document also narrates, several of his relatives and familiares suffered a lot of serious injuries or died. George and his army freed many prisoners in the region and sent many severed heads of Mongols to the royal court. In 1298, George himself also commemorated the events, when he rewarded his familiaris, Thomas, son of Hippolytus. Accordingly, they jointly freed enslaved Christian prisoners at the hillock of Tarkő (present-day Kamenica in Slovakia). They also fought near the fort of Regéc, where George was injured and fell off the horse. Thomas handed his own horse to his lord and thus George avoided "deadly peril". The invasion lasted for two months before the Mongols withdrew. Nogai and Talabuga invaded Lesser Poland in December 1287. In addition to looting, its purpose was to prevent High Duke Leszek II the Black from interfering in Hungarian and Ruthenian affairs. When the Mongols laid siege to Kraków, Leszek with his family and escort escaped to Hungary and sought assistance from Ladislaus IV. "On his own initiative", as the king's charter narrates, George Baksa led a Hungarian expedition into Poland in early 1288. His expeditionary force came up from Podolin and Késmárk (present-day Podolínec and Kežmarok in Slovakia, respectively), adding local Polish troops to their number on the way. His army completely surprised a small Mongol army of 1,000 men and annihilated it in the Battle of Stary Sącz at Sandecz (present-day Stary Sącz), also killing their commander. Thereafter, they freed "countless prisoners" from captivity. This was the last major engagement of the invasion. Leszek mobilized the main Polish army in the meantime and sought to join it with George's Hungarians; recognizing that his remaining forces would be dispersed and outnumbered if they remained, Nogai regrouped his men and retreated from Poland with most of his army intact. He arrived back in Ruthenia in late January 1288. Another group of Mongol marauders attempted to storm into Hungary through Szepesség, but George's army prevented it. During that time, in the spring of 1288, there were various clashes between the two armies and George's troops "guarded the border around the clock" against the besieger Mongols. After his success, the Mongols had gradually retreated from the region. For his effective aid and efforts, George Baksa was granted the possession of Wielogłowy, near Sandecz, by High Duke Leszek II after the campaign.

=== Later career ===
Ladislaus' rule was characterized by constant anarchy. His favoritism towards the Cumans made him so unpopular that many of his subjects accused him of inciting the Mongols to invade Hungary. He was isolated politically and spent the last years of his life wandering from place to place. Only few courtiers remained loyal to him, including George Baksa (even George's brothers turned against the monarch in 1287 and 1289). However, when a number of prelates and barons offered the crown to the distant relative, Andrew the Venetian, who arrived in Hungary in early 1290, George and his two nephews, Ladislaus and Doncs also left the allegiance of Ladislaus and swore loyalty to the pretender. After the assassination of Ladislaus in July 1290, Andrew III was crowned King of Hungary. Shortly thereafter, an adventurer announced that he was identical with the late Andrew of Slavonia, King Ladislaus' younger brother, claiming Hungary to himself against Andrew III. The false Duke Andrew invaded Hungary from Poland, but King Andrew's commander, George Baksa routed his troops, forcing him to return to Poland before 18 November. The pretender was in short killed by his Hungarian retainers. Subsequently, George Baksa negotiated with Władysław Łokietek the matter of marriage between Andrew III and Fenenna of Kuyavia, Władysław's niece. George Baksa also participated in King Andrew's royal campaign against Albert of Austria in the summer of 1291. The Baksa troops, including his nephew and familiaris, Sinka Sebesi, fought under the city walls of Vienna. For his loyalty and military service, King Andrew III transcribed and confirmed his predecessor's former land donations to George Baksa in February and August 1291.

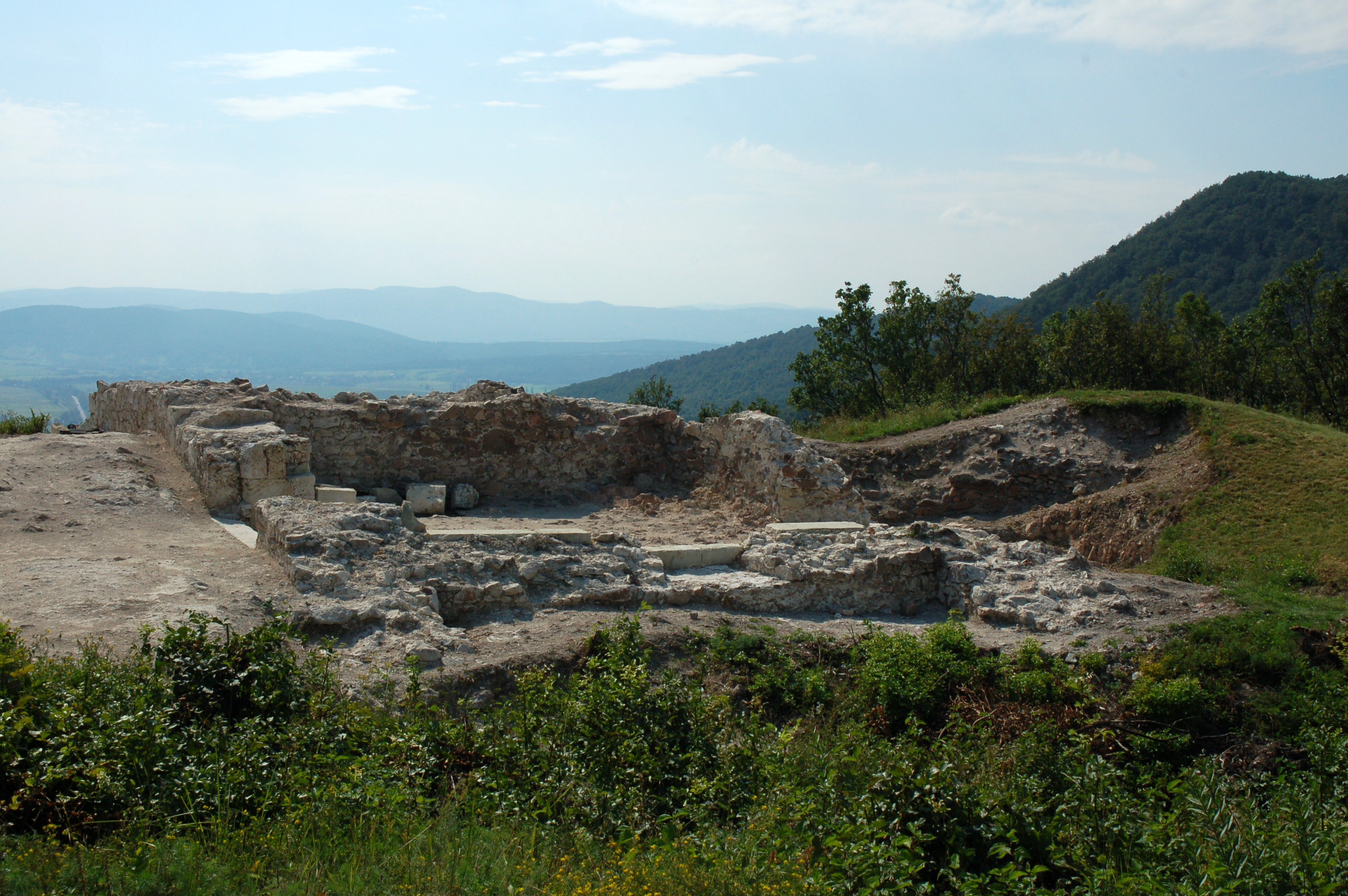
The ruins of Patak Castle (near Sátoraljaújhely). During the turbulent period after Andrew III's death, George Baksa arbitrarily handed the royal fort over to his kinship's property

George Baksa fell into disgrace in the royal court in the summer of 1294. According to two documents issued by later family members in 1314 and 1317, a certain "Bohemian potentate" Wytk, who resided in Sáros Castle (present-day Šariš in Slovakia), invaded George Baksa's seat Sóvár and seized its salt well. His nephew, Sinka led a military unit and successfully recovered the estate, while captured Wytk and burned the Bohemian lord's nearby fort. The 1317 charter contradicts this and narrates that Sinka already prevented Wytk from occupying the salt well. Some historians considered that the events occurred sometime between 1301 and 1305, during the brief reign of Wenceslaus, who installed his Bohemian partisans to several castles in Northeast Hungary. For a number of reasons, however, historian Attila Zsoldos argued the events occurred still during the reign of Andrew III and put the date to sometime before July 1294. In that year, Andrew confiscated Tamási in Szepes County (today Spišské Tomášovce in Slovakia) from George Baksa and his brothers because of their "disloyalty", as they "ravaged the realm" and "captured and wounded" Wytk, the royal castellan of Sáros. Zsoldos identified the castellan with Wytk Ludány, who came from a kindred of Bohemian origin, as Simon of Kéza's Gesta Hunnorum et Hungarorum preserved. The historian suggested that Wytk unlawfully tried to extend his influence over Sóvár by abusing the power of his position, but George Baksa and his nephew Sinka successfully repulsed the attack. Andrew III, whose whole reign was characterized by the confrontations with the oligarchs, regarded this act as a treachery without consideration of all aspects.

After a few years of neglect, George Baksa regained his influence and confidence in the royal court. Alongside other lords, he and his brother, Derek acted as arbiters during the course of the division of lands within the Lipóc branch of the gens (clan) Aba in 1299. George elevated into the positions of ispán of Szabolcs County and castellan of the royal fort of Patak (today ruins near Sátoraljaújhely) by April 1300. After the death of Andrew III and the extinction of the Árpád dynasty in 1301, George Baksa and his family usurped the lordship of Patak and its accessories for themselves. Due to their influence and wealth, the Baksa kinship was able to preserve their autonomy from the local oligarch Amadeus Aba, who had established a powerful dominion in Northeast Hungary independently of the Hungarian monarch during the era of so-called feudal anarchy. It is plausible that George supported the claim of Charles I of Hungary during the war of succession, which emerged after Andrew's death. Due to his advanced age, he retired entirely from public affairs. He died sometime after 1307.

== Lord of Sóvár ==
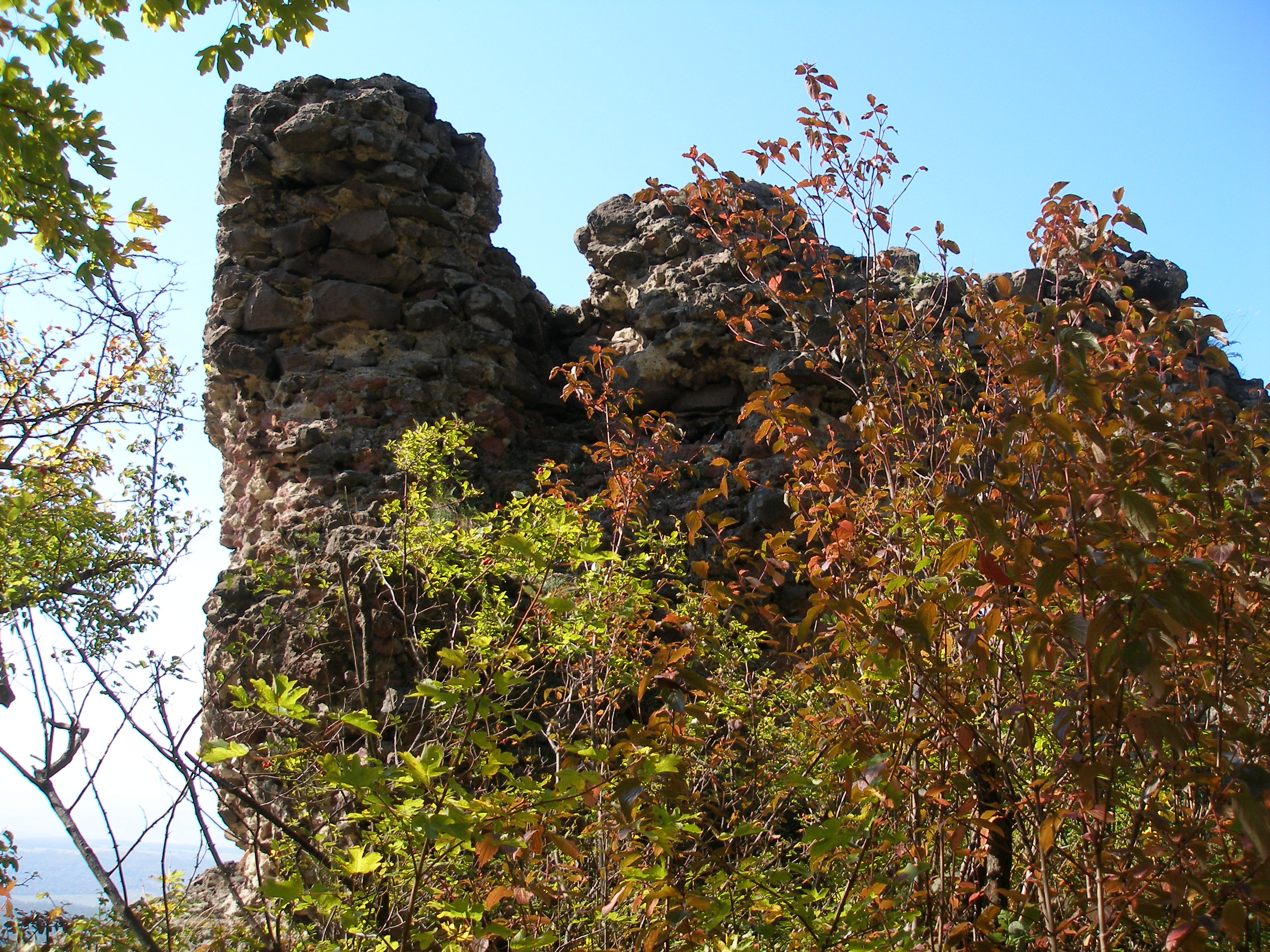
The ruins of Sóvár (Soliwar) near present-day Ruská Nová Ves in Slovakia

Two royal charters, both dated to 8 January 1285, which preserved the first land donations to George Baksa, proved to be non-authentic after the philological research of historians Iván Borsa and György Györffy. Both were forged by George's descendants in the early 14th century. However, Györffy considered there was lost original donation letter, which served as basis for later falsifications. The first letter is acceptable in terms of content, only its anachronistic style and terminology reveal the fact of counterfeiting: Accordingly, on 8 January 1285, Ladislaus IV issued a letter of donation to his faithful and ardent partisan George Baksa, who was granted the royal lands of Sóvár (today Solivar, a borough of Prešov in Slovakia) with its salt well, Sópatak and Delne in Sáros County. Contrary to this, the second letter contains another two donated villages: the unidentified Chedezdeth and Zarbuith, in addition to the right of building a castle.

In the autumn of 1288, Ladislaus IV confirmed his former land donation with the aforementioned privilege. Following that, George Baksa (or George of Sóvár, thereafter) separated his wealth from the other members of his kinship. He handed over his inherited wealth to his brothers, but, in exchange, he obliged them not to claim for his newly acquired properties. The Sós family was spectacularly omitted from later contracts within the Baksa kindred. Sóvár became the seat of George's surrounding landholdings, and his descendants adopted their family name after the local castle, which was built by George Baksa between 1288 and 1298. Andrew III confirmed the land donation in 1291. George donated to his nephew, Sinka Sebesi, a portion of Sóvár lordship, 100 marks from the annual income of the above-mentioned salt well and half cubic salt on Saturdays in 1299. In August 1314, George's son John confirmed his father's donation to Sinka, but he has earmarked the annual income of the salt in a lower amount (30 marks).

The 1288 donation letter omitted the donation of Delna and the exact determination of the borders of the newly acquired lands. It contains only Sóvár and Sópatak with its accessories and the forest stretching to the river Tapoly (Topľa), "with their old borders, which were settled already during the reign of Béla IV". George successfully requested Andrew III to confirm his ownership over Delna in 1291. However the original 1285 donation contained the exact borders, which has become important by the early 14th century, during the national review of donations in the royal court.

== Sources ==
- Nógrády, Árpád (2011). "A Sóvári Sósok 1285. évi hamis adománylevelei [The Forged Donation Letters of the Sós of Sóvár Family from 1285]". In Cabello, Juan; C. Tóth, Norbert (eds.). Erősségénél fogva várépítésre való: Tanulmányok a 70 éves Németh Péter tiszteletére [It is Very Well Placed for a Castle: Studies for the 70-year-old Péter Németh] (in Hungarian). Szabolcs-Szatmár-Bereg Megyei Önkormányzat Múzeumok Igazgatósága. pp. 279–288. ISBN 978-963-7220-75-3.
- Rudolf, Veronika (2023). Közép-Európa a hosszú 13. században [Central Europe in the Long 13th Century] (in Hungarian). Arpadiana XV., Research Centre for the Humanities. ISBN 978-963-416-406-7.
- Szőcs, Tibor (2010). "Egy második "tatárjárás"? A tatár–magyar kapcsolatok a XIII. század második felében [A Second Tartar Invasion? The Tartar–Hungarian Relations in the Second Half of the 13th Century]". Belvedere Meridionale (in Hungarian). 22 (3–4): 16–49. ISSN 1419-0222.
- Szűcs, Jenő (2002). Az utolsó Árpádok [The Last Árpáds] (in Hungarian). Osiris Kiadó. ISBN 963-389-271-6.
- Vásáry, István (2005). Cumans and Tatars: Oriental Military in the Pre-Ottoman Balkans, 1185–1365. Cambridge University Press. ISBN 0-521-83756-1.
- Zsoldos, Attila (1997). "Téténytől a Hód-tóig. Az 1279 és 1282 közötti évek politikatörténetének vázlata [From Tétény to Hód Lake: Outline of the Political History of the Years Between 1279 and 1282]". Történelmi Szemle (in Hungarian). 39 (1). Hungarian Academy of Sciences: 69–98. ISSN 0040-9634.
- Zsoldos, Attila (1998). "Tamás fia Sinka érdemei (Elhallgatás és manipuláció oklevelek narratioiban) [The Merits of Sinka, son of Thomas (Concealment and Manipulation in the Narrations of Charters)]". In Csukovits, Enikő (ed.). Tanulmányok Borsa Iván tiszteletére (in Hungarian). National Archives of Hungary. pp. 327–337. ISBN 963-631-091-2.
- Zsoldos, Attila (2007). Családi ügy: IV. Béla és István ifjabb király viszálya az 1260-as években [A family affair: The Conflict between Béla IV and Junior King Stephen in the 1260s] (in Hungarian). História, MTA Történettudományi Intézete. ISBN 978-963-9627-15-4.
- Zsoldos, Attila (2011). Magyarország világi archontológiája, 1000–1301 [Secular Archontology of Hungary, 1000–1301] (in Hungarian). História, MTA Történettudományi Intézete. ISBN 978-963-9627-38-3.
- Zsoldos, Attila (2016). "A Berettyó urai [The Lords of Berettyó]". In Zsoldos, Attila (ed.). Nagyvárad és Bihar az Árpád-kor végén (Tanulmányok Biharország történetéből 3.) (in Hungarian). Varadinum Kulturális Alapítvány. pp. 101–154. ISBN 978-973-0-21419-2.

George Genus Baksa Born: c. 1250 Died: after 1307
Political offices
Preceded by Reynold Básztély (?)	Ispán of Szabolcs; 1300	Succeeded by Beke Borsa (?)
