= Third Mongol invasion of Poland =

Mongol campaign 1287–88

- Part of the Mongol invasion of Europe
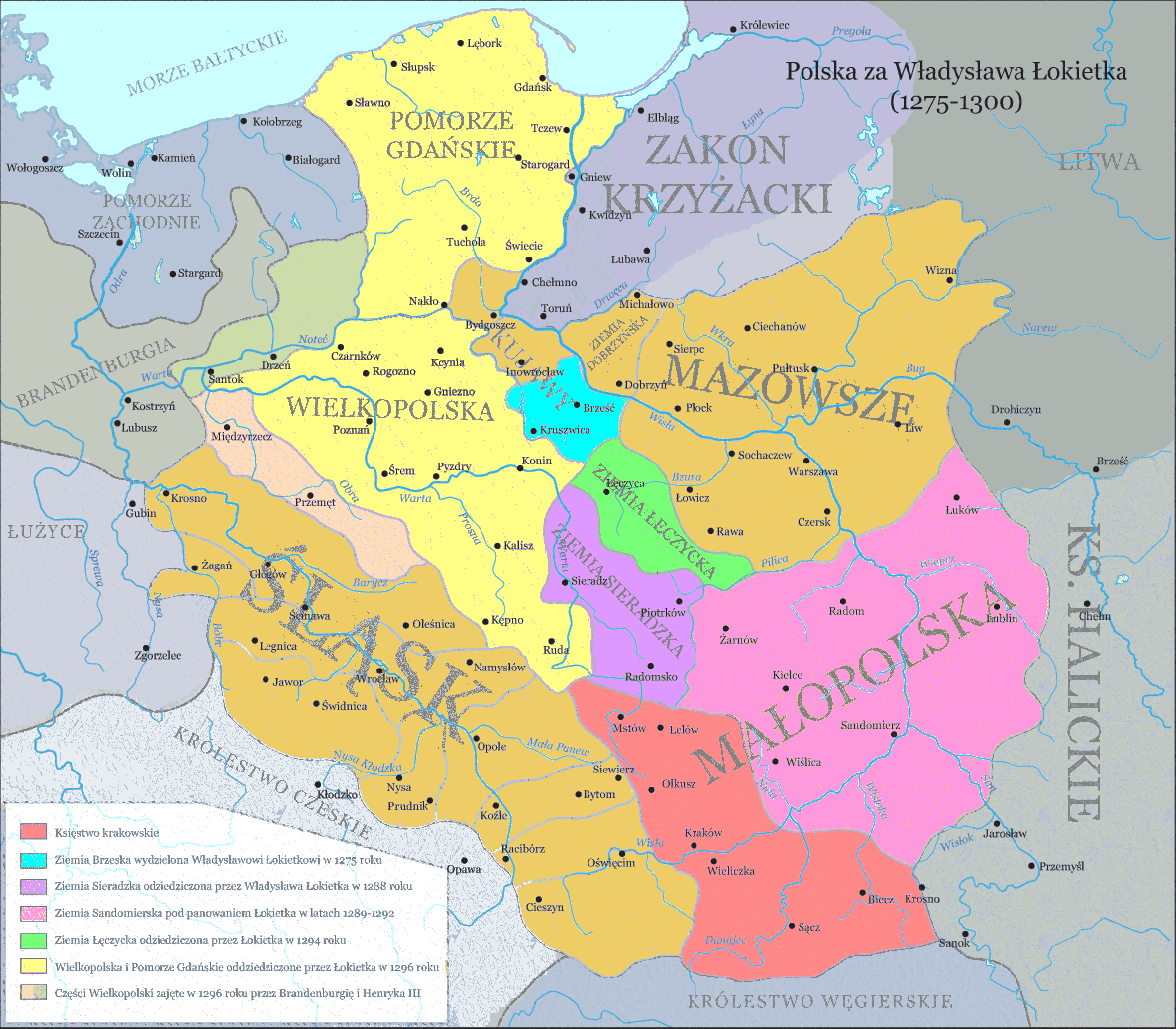
- Map of Poland, 1275–1300. Talabuga attacked the duchy of Lesser Poland (pink), while Nogai attacked the duchies of Krakow (red) and Sieradz (purple).
Date	December 6th, 1287 – early February, 1288
Location	Eastern and southern Poland
Result	Polish–Hungarian victory
Territorial changes	Mongol invasion repulsed; Mongols expelled from Eastern Poland.

Belligerents
Golden Horde; Kingdom of Galicia–Volhynia	Kingdom of Poland; Kingdom of Hungary

Commanders and leaders
Talabuga Khan; Nogai Khan; Leo I of Galicia; Volodymir of Volhynia; Duke Mstislav of Lutsk	Leszek II the Black; György of Sóvár

Strength
30,000 cavalry 20,000 in Talabuga's column 10,000 in Nogai's column	15,000; 5,000 cavalry 10,000 infantry

Casualties and losses
Significant	Heavy

The Third Mongol invasion of Poland was carried out by Talabuga Khan and Nogai Khan in 1287–1288. As in the second invasion, its purpose was to loot Lesser Poland, and to prevent Duke Leszek II the Black from interfering in Hungarian and Ruthenian affairs. The invasion was also part of the hostilities between Poland and Ruthenia; in 1281, the Poles had defeated a Mongol force near Goslicz which had entered Duke Leszek's territory in support of Lev I.

== Planning ==
In November 1287, Nogai Khan demanded that the princes of Ruthenia show up personally leading their armies to join him on an expedition to Poland, while he and Talabuga gathered their own cavalry. He assembled what the Galician-Volhynian Chronicle referred to as "a great host" alongside his vassals on the Polish-Galician border. After leaving some men behind in Ruthenia to defend his rear, he went about planning the invasion.

The expedition was undertaken by a force of 30,000 men, a mix of Mongol/Turkic troops and Ruthenian vassal troops. The plan, devised by Nogai Khan, was similar to the one from 1259. The Mongol army was divided into two columns. 20,000 cavalry (including Ruthenians) under Talabuga attacked towards Sandomierz and northern Lesser Poland, while another 10,000 cavalry (all Mongol/Turkic; no sources reference Ruthenians) under Nogai headed towards the area of Kraków - Sacz. Like earlier invasions, the campaign was to be conducted with great speed and surprise to prevent the enemy from properly marshaling their forces. After looting their respective provinces and capturing Sandomierz, they were to unite north of Kraków. After joining the two groups, the combined host was planned to march through Kielce, Chęciny, Jędrzejów, and Miechów, before sacking Kraków. After Poland was razed, the Mongol troops were to return to Rus.

The Polish defenders did not have any elaborate plan, as the raid was clearly a surprise. An ad hoc strategy was devised whereby most forces concentrated on castles and fortified cities rather than riding out to meet the Mongols in field battles. Duke Leszek, with his main force, stood in the path of the first column.

== Invasion ==
=== Northern column ===
The northern column of the Mongol forces was supported by a large contingent of the Mongol vassals, Ruthenians, under Duke Mstislav of Lutsk, Duke Volodymyr of Volhynia, and Duke Lev of Halych. Leszek II the Black stood opposed to the Mongols with probably 15,000 strong. Furthermore, in comparison to the second invasion, several towns and cities had been fortified. Kraków in particular was described as having a castle made entirely out of stone, and was "protected by catapults and large and small crossbows.” This was in sharp contrast to the first two invasions, when Kraków's citadel was made of wood.

On December 7, 1287, the northern group of Mongol forces under Talabuga left a camp near Volodymyr, and, after by-passing Lublin, the army tried to cross the Vistula near Zawichost. Since the river was not frozen, they had to find a ford, heading southwards. The invaders besieged and assaulted Sandomierz, but abandoned their siege after their storming attempt was beaten back. They left Ruthenian units in the area of the city and changed their course.

Mongol and Ruthenian forces failed to capture many fortified locations after the column dispersed into multiple detachments and raiding parties. Most likely, a major detachment attempted to approach the Łysa Góra Abbey with another approaching the town of Tursko, while skirmishing with local Polish forces. A few days after the unsuccessful siege of Sandomierz, forces of Talabuga's main column were attacked by a Polish force of unknown but significant size under Duke Leszek near the Świętokrzyskie Mountains, and were defeated in the Battle of Łagów, which Polish annals place on December 20. The defeat was quite severe, and after reaching the area of Kielce, the Mongol forces began a retreat, taking what loot they had already gathered with them. In January 1288, they reached their winter camp in Lviv. Leszek and his army meanwhile headed towards Kraków, to prepare the defense of the Polish capital.

=== Southern column ===
The southern group of Mongol forces under Nogai Khan (divided into at least three detachments) crossed into Poland on December 24, 1287 and besieged Kraków. The Mongols launched an unsuccessful assault on the fortified city, suffering heavy casualties and losing several of their leaders in the process. Nogai Khan decided to change plans, divide his detachment into smaller units, and plunder the areas both north and south of Kraków; his units plundered the villages around Kraków and the Duchy of Sieradz while engaging in small battles with local Polish forces sallying from towns and castles. Parallel to this, two other columns of his army besieged the towns of Podolínec and Stary Sącz. Soon after the battle of Kraków, Leszek, his wife, and a small group of retainers slipped into the Kingdom of Hungary and requested aid from King Ladislaus IV, who had defeated another Mongol invasion less than two years earlier.

At Podolínec, the Mongols devastated the settlement and the area around it after some skirmishes with the local militia. At Stary Sącz, the siege lasted roughly a month without bringing any tangible results. The town was well stocked, with strong walls and a good garrison. Meanwhile, the Hungarian king had approved action against the Mongols, and tasked the noble George of Sóvár with leading the Hungarian expedition. His expeditionary force came up from Podolínec and Kežmarok, adding local Polish troops to their number on the way. The Hungarian-Polish force completely surprised a small Mongol army of 1,000 men and annihilated it at the Battle of Stary Sącz, killing the army's commander. This was the last major engagement of the invasion. Leszek mobilized the main Polish army in the meantime and sought to join it with George's Hungarians; recognizing that his remaining forces would be dispersed and outnumbered if they remained, Nogai regrouped his men and retreated from Poland with most of his army intact. He arrived back in Ruthenia in late January, 1288, where his soldiers plundered the villages of his vassals in Galicia.

== Aftermath ==
Compared to the first two invasions, the raid of 1287–88 was short and much less devastating. The Mongols did not capture any significant cities or castles and lost a significant number of men. They also took fewer prisoners and less loot than in the previous invasions.

Polish historian Stefan Krakowski credits the relative failure of the Mongol invasion to two main causes. First, while 30,000 men was larger than the previous incursions into Poland, the rivalry between Talabuga and Nogai meant that the two columns didn't cooperate well, with the former withdrawing by the time the latter entered Poland. Second, the Poles' upgraded fortifications made their settlements much harder to take, which enabled Leszek and his nobles to put into action a simple three-stage defensive plan. The first stage was passive defense by garrisons (e.g. Sandomierz, Łysa Góra, Kraków, Tursko), the second was the fight against small Mongol detachments by local sallying forces, and the third stage was a counterblow of a large Hungarian-Polish army against the dispersed and reduced Mongols. This contrasted quite sharply with the first invasion. There the Mongols also dispersed their army into smaller units, but were able to easily take the poorly fortified settlements.

== Legacy ==
The 1287–1288 campaign is commonly held to be the origin of Lajkonik, a folk figure and unofficial symbol of the city of Kraków. The (possibly apocryphal) story goes that a group of Poles discovered a Mongol camp outside the city walls of Kraków in December 1287 while the Mongols were besieging it, and launched a surprise raid in which several Mongol generals were killed, including the commander of the siege. The leader of the raid then wore the Mongol commander's richly decorated outfit back into the city.
