= Battle of Stary Sącz =

1288 battle of the Mongol invasion of Poland

- Part of the Mongol invasion of Poland
Date	January 1288
Location	Stary Sącz, (Poland)
Result	Polish–Hungarian victory

Belligerents
Golden Horde	Kingdom of Poland

Commanders and leaders
Nogai Khan	Leszek II the Black; George Baksa

Strength
Unknown	Unknown

Casualties and losses
Heavy	Unknown

The Battle of Stary Sącz was a battle during the Third Mongol invasion of Poland where a Polish-Hungarian army defeated a Golden Horde force in January 1288.

== Battle ==
The Mongols began the Third Mongol Invasion of Poland with two separate armies. The Southern Army was commanded by Nogai Khan. The Polish senior Duke Leszek II the Black was still busy fighting the Northern Mongol army under Talabuga Khan in the Świętokrzyskie Mountains in the winter of 1287.

In December 1287, the Southern Army first unsuccessfully besieged Kraków and then began plundering the surrounding countryside and the Podhale region. This was resisted by the local population, the Gorals, who attacked the Mongol camps on the Dunajec River and drove the Mongols out of their region. The Mongols withdrew after this Battle of the Dunajec and laid siege to Stary Sącz.

In the meantime, the Polish army under Leszek the Black united with a Hungarian army under the Voivode George Baksa. The besiegers were surprised by the relief army and lost the battle. After this defeat, the Mongols under Nogai Khan withdrew from Poland and Hungary at the end of January 1288.

== Bibliography ==
- Bunar, Piotr; Sroka, Stanisław A. (2004). Słownik wojen, bitew i potyczek w średniowiecznej Polsce [Dictionary of Wars, Battles, and Skirmishes in Medieval Poland] (in Polish).
