= Anna of Hungary, Duchess of Macsó =

Daughter of Béla IV of Hungary (born c. 1226)

Anna of Hungary
- Born: c. 1226
- Spouse: Rostislav Mikhailovich
- Issue: Béla of Macsó; Michael of Bosnia; Kunigunda, Queen of Bohemia; Gryfina, High Duchess consort of Poland
- House: Árpád dynasty
- Father: Béla IV of Hungary
- Mother: Maria Laskarina

Anna of Hungary (born c. 1226) was a daughter of Béla IV of Hungary and his wife, Maria Laskarina. Anna was a member of the House of Árpád. Anna gained many titles from her marriage to Rostislav Mikhailovich.

== Family ==
Anna was the third of ten children born to her parents. She was sister to three saints: Kinga, Margaret and Blessed Jolenta. Other siblings included Stephen V of Hungary and Elizabeth of Hungary, Duchess of Bavaria.

Her paternal grandparents were Andrew II of Hungary and Gertrude of Merania, sister to Agnes of Merania.

Her maternal grandparents were Theodore I Laskaris and Anna Komnena Angelina.

== Marriage ==
In 1243, Anna married Rostislav Mikhailovich. Rostislav could not strengthen his rule in Halych, so he went to the court of King Béla IV of Hungary, and there he married Anna. Anna had always been her father's favourite daughter. He allowed her to exercise more and more influence over him. In his last will, Béla entrusted his daughter and his followers to her son-in-law, Ottokar II of Bohemia, because he did not trust his eldest son Stephen. Michael inherited their father's part of Bosnia. King Béla IV, having made these assignments to his grandsons, decided also to make some further changes in his peripheral territories, and assigned Slavonia, Dalmatia, and Croatia, which until then had all been under his heir, the future Stephen V of Hungary, to a younger son named Béla.

Stephen was infuriated and immediately revolted against his father; during the ensuing war, Anna and her son, Béla of Macsó assisted Béla IV. Anna's father and brother concluded a peace on 5 December 1262, and according to the peace the kingdom was divided, the latter acquiring the territories east of the river Danube as “junior king”. After the peace, Stephen V occupied the possessions which Anna's sons had inherited from their father in the eastern parts of the kingdom (the former royal possessions in Bereg County and the Castle of Füzér). Anna submitted a formal complaint against her brother to Pope Urban IV, but the "junior king" did not hand back their possessions.

Anna went to live at her son-in-law's royal court in Bohemia. Ottokar married Anna's daughter, Kunigunda in 1261 and they became parents to Wenceslaus II of Bohemia. Anna's husband died in 1262, leaving Anna a widow. It is unknown when Anna died but probably about 1274.

== Children ==
The couple had the following children:

- Duke Béla of Macsó (ca. 1243 – November, 1272)
- Duke Michael of Bosnia (before 1245 – 1271)
- Unnamed daughter (perhaps Anna) wife firstly of Tsar Michael Asen I of Bulgaria, secondly of Tsar Koloman II of Bulgaria
- Kunigunda, Queen Consort of Bohemia (1245 – September 9, 1285), wife firstly of King Ottokar II of Bohemia, and secondly of Zaviš von Falkenstein-Rosenberg
- Gryfina, High Duchess consort of Poland, (? – May 26, 1303/1309), wife of Prince Leszek II of Cracow
- Margaret, a nun.
