= Sinka Sebesi =

- Lord of Sebeskő
- Born: c. 1270
- Died: July 1321; Trencsén Castle, Kingdom of Hungary (today Slovakia)
- Noble family: House of Sebesi
- Issue: Peter I Pető a daughter
- Father: Thomas Sebesi
- Mother: N Baksa

Sinka Sebesi, also known as Sinka, son of Thomas (Hungarian: Tamás fia Sinka; killed in action in July 1321), was a Hungarian medieval soldier and nobleman at the turn of the 13th and 14th centuries. He distinguished himself in various royal campaigns since the reign of Andrew III of Hungary. He actively participated in the unification war of Charles I of Hungary against the oligarchic domains.

== Background ==
Sinka was born around 1270 into a lower noble family from Upper Hungary, which owned villages and lands mainly in Sáros County. He was the only known son of Thomas Sebesi and an unidentified daughter of a local influential nobleman, Simon Baksa. Sinka had two sons from an unknown marriage, Peter the "Broken", a royal page, and Pető. The Sebesi family, which flourished until the late 15th century, ascended from Peter. Sinka also had a daughter, who married lord Blaise Fonyi.

== Military career ==
Sinka began his military career as a familiaris of his maternal uncle George Baksa. In this capacity, he participated in King Andrew's royal campaign against Albert of Austria in the summer of 1291. According to his uncle's donation letter from 1299, Sinka bravely fought under the city walls of Vienna. He seriously injured during these clashes, as Andrew's privilege charter from 1300 narrates. He remained in the service of the Baksas for the following years. According to two documents issued by later family members in 1314 and 1317, a certain "Bohemian potentate" Wytk, who resided in Sáros Castle (present-day Šariš in Slovakia), invaded George Baksa's seat Sóvár (today Solivar, a borough of Prešov in Slovakia) and seized its salt well. Sinka led a military unit and successfully recovered the estate, while captured Wytk and burned the Bohemian lord's nearby fort. The 1317 charter contradicts this and narrates that Sinka already prevented Wytk from occupying the salt well. Some historians considered that the events occurred sometime between 1301 and 1305, during the brief reign of Wenceslaus, who installed his Bohemian partisans to several castles in Northeast Hungary. For a number of reasons, however, historian Attila Zsoldos argued the events occurred still during the reign of Andrew III and put the date to sometime before July 1294. In that year, Andrew confiscated Tamási in Szepes County (today Spišské Tomášovce in Slovakia) from George Baksa and his brothers because of their "disloyalty", as they "ravaged the realm" and "captured and wounded" Wytk, the royal castellan of Sáros. Zsoldos identified the castellan with Wytk Ludány, who came from a kindred of Bohemian origin, as Simon of Kéza's Gesta Hunnorum et Hungarorum preserved. The historian suggested that Wytk unlawfully tried to extend his influence over Sóvár by abusing the power of his position, but George Baksa and his nephew Sinka successfully repulsed the attack. Andrew III, whose whole reign was characterized by the confrontations with the oligarchs, regarded this act as a treachery without consideration of all aspects.

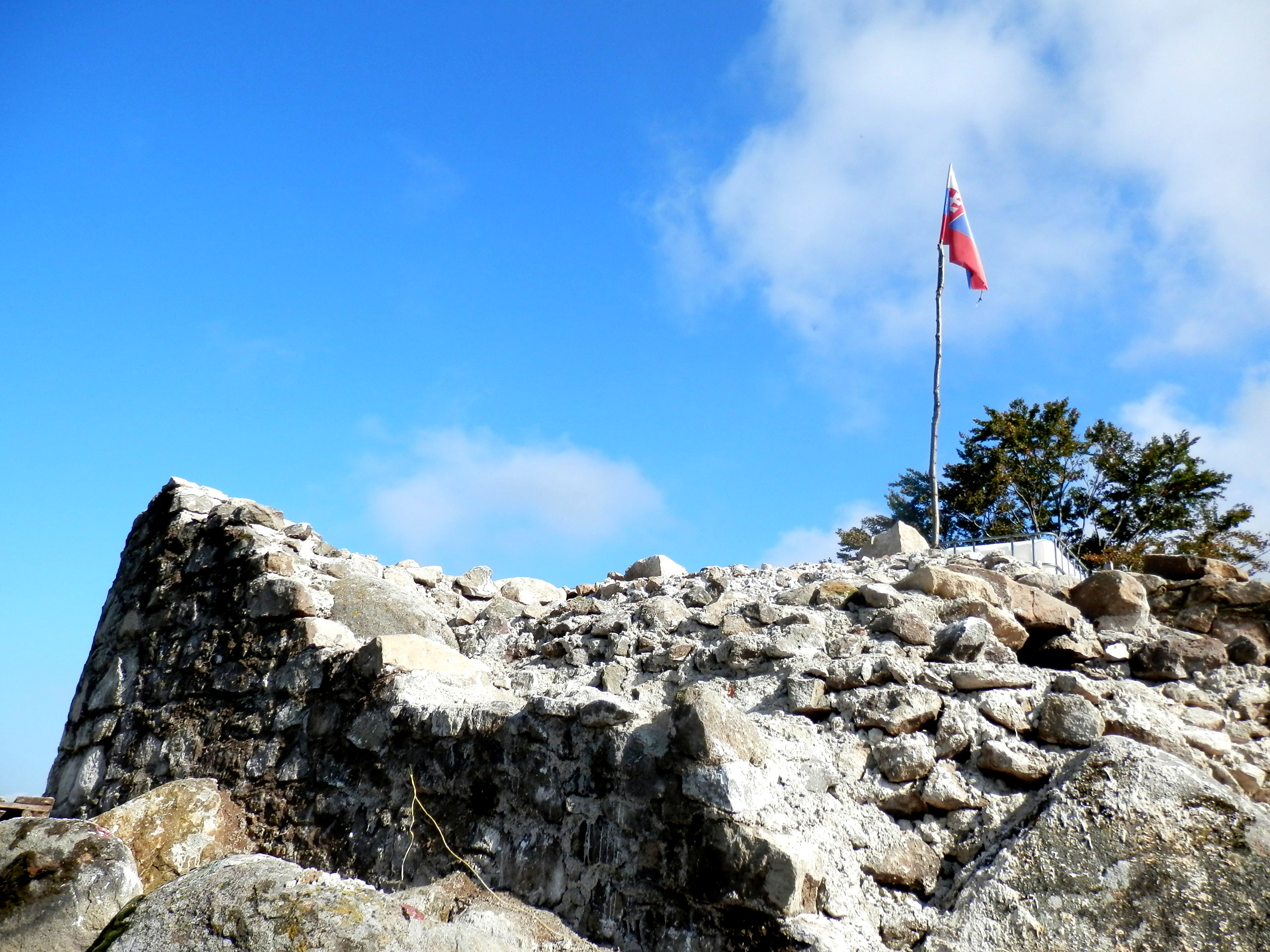
The ruins of Šebeš (Sebeskő) Castle near Podhradík, Slovakia, owned by Sinka Sebesi and his descendants

Sinka's role in this incident perhaps remained undiscovered, as he was able to participate in the royal campaign against the rebellious Roland Borsa, Voivode of Transylvania, when Andrew laid siege to Borsa's fort at Adorján (present-day Adrian in Romania) in the summer of 1294. Sinka injured during the siege, which lasted three months before the fort fell to Andrew in October. In 1297, Andrew III sent auxiliary troops to the Kingdom of Poland in order to provide assistance to his first wife's uncle Władysław Łokietek, Duke of Greater Poland against Henry III, Duke of Głogów. Sinka was involved in the campaign and fought in Silesia, where he injured. Both George Baksa (1299) and Andrew III (1300) mentioned his participation, in addition to the documents of the Baksa kindred (1314 and 1317). Returning home, Sinka bestowed horses, stallions, furs, jewelry and weapons at a value of 1,000 marks to his lord, George Baksa. For his loyal service and bravery, Sinka was granted a portion of Sóvár lordship, 100 marks from the annual income of the above-mentioned salt well and half cubic salt on Saturdays by his uncle in 1299. During that time, Sinka already owned the nearby Sebeskő Castle (today Šebeš, ruins near Podhradík, Slovakia), after which his descendants derived their family name. Sinka also got half the big meadow between the two castles (Sóvár and Sebeskő) from George Baksa. In the next year, Andrew III donated Ásgút (present-day Podhorany in Slovakia) to Sinka, excluding the village from the jurisdiction of the ispán of Sáros County. In August 1314, George's son John confirmed his father's donation to Sinka, but he has earmarked the annual income of the salt in a lower amount (30 marks). In November 1317, John and his brother Peter, and their cousins Ladislaus and Doncs requested Charles I to confirm the donation with the annual amount of 60 marks.

After the death of Andrew III and the extinction of the Árpád dynasty in 1301, Sinka supported the claim of Charles of Anjou in the emerging civil war, following the Baksas' political orientation. After Charles became the undisputed ruler of Hungary, Sinka participated in his unification war against the oligarchic powers in various occasions. The burghers of Kassa (now Košice in Slovakia) assassinated Amadeus Aba in September 1311. After that Charles I was committed to eradicating the Abas' oligarchic rule. However, Amadeus' sons rebelled against the king. The Baksas and their allies, including Sinka remained faithful to Charles. Around February 1312, Sinka participated in a battle against David Aba (it is plausible that Ladislaus Baksa was captured in the same time). He was among the defenders of Kassa against the subsequent raids by the Aba troops. He took part in the siege of Sáros Castle in April; the royal troops successfully occupied the fort from the Zólyom kinship, the Abas' allies. Sinka also participated in the Battle of Rozgony on 15 June 1312, where the Abas were decisively defeated and their power collapsed in Northeast Hungary. In the autumn of 1315, Charles I launched his first large-scale campaign against John Kőszegi and his territory in Transdanubia. He laid siege the fort of Nyék in Tolna County in November. Sinka was present at the siege and "fought valiantly" against the defenders. Albeit the fort of Nyék was occupied for a short time, a relief army of the Kőszegis recovered the castle and the royal campaign ended in failure. After the death of the most powerful oligarch Matthew Csák in March 1321, Charles' army invaded the deceased lord's province, which soon disintegrated because most of his former castellans yielded without resistance. The king personally led the siege of Csák's former seat, Trencsén Castle (now Trenčín in Slovakia). Sinka also participated in the siege, where he was killed in July, before it fell on 8 August, according to a document issued in the next year.

== Sources ==
- Engel, Pál (1988). "Az ország újraegyesítése. I. Károly küzdelmei az oligarchák ellen (1310–1323) [Reunification of the Realm. The Struggles of Charles I Against the Oligarchs (1310–1323)]". Századok (in Hungarian). 122 (1–2). Magyar Történelmi Társulat: 89–146. ISSN 0039-8098.
- Engel, Pál (1996). Magyarország világi archontológiája, 1301–1457, I [Secular Archontology of Hungary, 1301–1457, Volume I] (in Hungarian). História, MTA Történettudományi Intézete. ISBN 963-8312-44-0.
- Zsoldos, Attila (1998). "Tamás fia Sinka érdemei (Elhallgatás és manipuláció oklevelek narratioiban) [The Merits of Sinka, son of Thomas (Concealment and Manipulation in the Narrations of Charters)]". In Csukovits, Enikő (ed.). Tanulmányok Borsa Iván tiszteletére (in Hungarian). National Archives of Hungary. pp. 327–337. ISBN 963-631-091-2.
- Zsoldos, Attila (2017). A Druget-tartomány története 1315–1342 [The History of the Druget Province 1315–1342] (in Hungarian). MTA Bölcsészettudományi Kutatóközpont Történettudományi Intézete. ISBN 978-963-4160-63-2.
