= Battle of Łagów =

1287 battle of the Mongol invasion of Poland

- Part of the Mongol invasion of Poland
Date	Winter 1287
Location	Łagów, Świętokrzyskie Voivodeship, Poland
Result	Polish victory: Invading army defeated

Belligerents
Kingdom of Galicia-Volhynia; Golden Horde	Kingdom of Poland

Commanders and leaders
Talabuga Khan	Leszek II the Black

Strength
10,000	6,000

Casualties and losses
Unknown	Unknown

The Battle of Łagów was a battle during the Third Mongol invasion of Poland in the winter of 1287, where a Polish army defeated an invading Golden Horde force.

== Battle ==
The Mongols began the Third Mongol Invasion of Poland with two separate armies. The northern army was commanded by Talabuga Khan. The senior Polish Duke Leszek II the Black advanced with his army to meet it. They met in the Świętokrzyskie Mountains after the Mongols had unsuccessfully besieged the Święty Krzyż Monastery. Leszek the Black managed to defeat Tulabuga near Łagów, who then withdrew from Poland.

After his victory, Leszek the Black rushed south, where another Mongolian force under command of Nogai Khan had invaded Lesser Poland.
