= Michael of Bosnia =

Michael of Bosnia (after 1243 – before 23 March 1266), Duke of Bosnia from 1262 to 1266, was a member of the Olgovichi clan.

He was the son of Duke Rostislav of Macsó and his wife, Anna, a daughter of King Béla IV of Hungary. When Duke Rostislav died in 1262, his lands were divided between his sons: Michael inherited their father's part of Bosnia, and Béla inherited the Banate of Macsó.

When Michael died, his lands were inherited by his brother.

== Sources ==
- Bataković, Dušan T., ed. (2005). Histoire du peuple serbe [History of the Serbian People] (in French). Lausanne: L'Age d'Homme. ISBN 9782825119587.
- Ćirković, Sima (2004). The Serbs. Malden: Blackwell Publishing. ISBN 9781405142915.
- Engel, Pál (2001). The Realm of St. Stephen: A History of Medieval Hungary, 895-1526. London & New York: I.B.Tauris. ISBN 9781850439776.
- Fine, John Van Antwerp Jr. (1994) [1987]. The Late Medieval Balkans: A Critical Survey from the Late Twelfth Century to the Ottoman Conquest. Ann Arbor, Michigan: University of Michigan Press. ISBN 0472082604.
- Font, Márta (2020). "Rostislav, Dominus de Macho". Stefan the First-Crowned and His Time. Belgrade: Institute of History. pp. 309–326. ISBN 9788677431396.
- Isailović, Neven (2016). "Living by the Border: South Slavic Marcher Lords in the Late Medieval Balkans (13th–15th Centuries)". Banatica. 26 (2): 105–117.
- Jireček, Constantin (1911). Geschichte der Serben. Vol. 1. Gotha: Perthes.
- Kristó, Gyula; Engel, Pál; Makk, Ferenc, eds. (1994), "Michael of Bosnia", Korai magyar történeti lexikon (9-14. század), Budapest: Akadémiai Kiadó, ISBN 963-05-6722-9.
- Харди, Ђура (2014). "О смрти господара Мачве кнеза Ростислава Михаилович". Наукові праці Кам'янець-Подільського національного університету імені Івана Огієнка: Історичні науки. Vol. 24. Кам'янець-Подільський. pp. 183–194.

Michael of Bosnia Olgovichi Born: after 1243 Died: before 23 March 1266
Regnal titles
Preceded by Rostislav	Duke of Bosnia; 1262–1266	Succeeded by Béla
