= Gryfina of Halych =

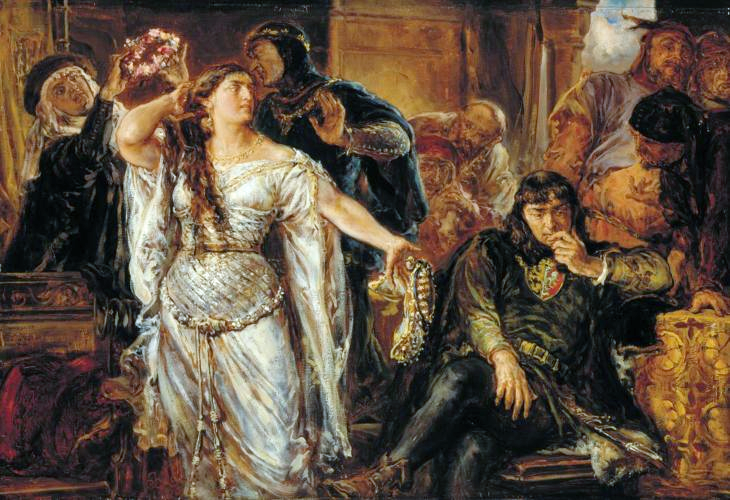
- The painting of Gryfina and Leszek II the Black

High Duchess consort of Poland
- Tenure: 1279–30 September 1288
- Born: c. 1248
- Died: 1305–1309
- Spouse: Leszek II the Black
- House: Olgovichi
- Father: Rostislav Mikhailovich
- Mother: Anna of Hungary

Gryfina, or Agrippina (c. 1248 – between 1305 and 1309) was a Princess of Kraków by her marriage to Leszek II the Black in 1265; she later became a nun and abbess.

== Family ==
Gryfina was the daughter of Rostislav Mikhailovich (1225–1262), Prince of Halych, and his wife Anna of Hungary (1226–c. 1270), daughter of Béla IV of Hungary. After losing the throne of Halych, Rostislav fled to Hungary and was received at the court of his father-in-law, King Béla IV. Rostislav was later granted the administration of Slavonia, one of the most important regions of the Hungarian Medieval Kingdom. Gryfina was born in Hungary, where she was raised with her sisters. One of her sisters was Kunigunda, who married Ottakar II of Bohemia and was the mother of Wenceslaus II of Bohemia.

== Marriage ==
In 1265, at the age of seventeen, Gryfina was married to Leszek, son of Casimir I of Kuyavia and Constance of Wrocław. The wedding was organized by Bolesław V the Chaste. Between 1271 and 1274 the spouses separated, Gryfina having publicly accused her husband of impotency, adding that for this reason their marriage had never been consummated. Leszek sought treatment from the physician Mikołaj of Kraków, but the marriage remained childless. After four years, Bolesław V forced a reconciliation between the spouses, as stated by the Rocznik Traski [pl]: "the lack of offspring caused a great abomination in the nation".

During the revolt against her husband in 1285, Gryfina took refuge in Wawel under the care of the citizens. During the third Tatar raid of 1287 she escaped with her husband to Hungary, where many of her family members lived.

== Widowhood ==
After the death of her husband in 1288, Gryfina's nephew Wenceslaus II of Bohemia claimed Poland on the basis of his aunt's marriage. Gryfina retired to the monastery of the Poor Clares in Stary Sącz. The prioress there was her mother's sister, Kinga of Poland, the widow of Bolesław V the Chaste. After Kinga's death, Gryfina became abbess.

In 1300, Gryfina visited Bohemia and cared for Elisabeth Richeza of Poland, daughter of Przemysł II and fiancée of her nephew Wenceslaus since the death of his first wife Judith of Habsburg. She educated Elisabeth Richeza in court traditions.

Gryfina died between 1305 and 1309, most likely in 1309. She is buried in the Convent of St. Agnes in Prague.

== Notes and references ==
Gryfina of Halych Olgovichi Born: c. 1248 Died: 1305–1309
Royal titles
Preceded by Kinga of Poland	High Duchess consort of Poland; 1279?–30 September 1288	Succeeded by Matilda of Brandenburg
