= Béla of Macsó =

Duke of Macsó
- Reign: 1262–1272
- Predecessor: Rostislav Mikhailovich
- Successor: Roland I Rátót

Duke of Bosnia
- Reign: 1266/1271–1272
- Predecessor: Michael of Bosnia
- Successor: Stephen Gutkeled
- Born: after 1243
- Died: November 1272; Margaret Island, Hungary
- House: Olgovichi
- Father: Rostislav Mikhailovich
- Mother: Anna of Hungary

Béla of Macsó (after 1243 – November 1272) was a member of the Olgovichi clan. He was Duke of Macsó (1262–1272) and of Bosnia (1266/1271–1272); and thus he governed the southern provinces of the Kingdom of Hungary.

Béla was the son of Duke Rostislav of Macsó and his wife, Anna, a daughter of King Béla IV of Hungary. When Duke Rostislav died in 1262, his lands were divided between his sons: Béla inherited the Banate of Macsó (including Belgrade and the Braničevo province), and his brother, Michael inherited their father’s part of Bosnia. King Béla IV, having made these assignments to his grandsons, decided also to make some further changes in his peripheral territories, and assigned Slavonia, Dalmatia, and Croatia, which until then had all been under his elder son and heir, Stephen V, to a younger son named Béla.

Stephen V was infuriated and immediately revolted against his father; during the ensuing war, Béla and his mother assisted Béla IV. His grandfather and uncle (Béla IV and Stephen V) concluded a peace on 5 December 1262, and according to the peace the kingdom was divided, the latter acquiring the territories east of the river Danube as “junior king”. After the peace, Stephen V occupied the possessions which Béla and his brother had inherited from their father in the eastern parts of the kingdom (the former royal possessions in Bereg County and the Castle of Füzér). Their mother submitted a formal complaint against her brother to Pope Urban IV, but the "junior king" did not hand back their possessions.

In December 1264, the troops of Béla IV invaded the parts of the kingdom which had been ruled by the “junior king”. The “senior king” appointed the young Béla (his grandson) to lead one of his troops, but the actual leader of the royal army was Henry Kőszegi. In the Battle of Isaszeg, Stephen V defeated his father’s troops, and Béla fled from the battle-field.

The two kings (Béla’s grandfather and uncle) concluded a new peace on March 23, 1266 on the Margaret Island and affirmed the former division of the Kingdom of Hungary between them. By that time Béla’s brother, Michael had died, and thus Béla inherited the parts of Bosnia his brother had been ruling before his death. In 1268, King Stefan Uroš I of Serbia led his troops to plunder Macsó, and the Serbs did considerable damage before Hungarian help came. The Hungarian troops sent by Béla’s grandfather then managed to capture Stefan Uroš himself, and the Serbian king was forced to purchase his release.

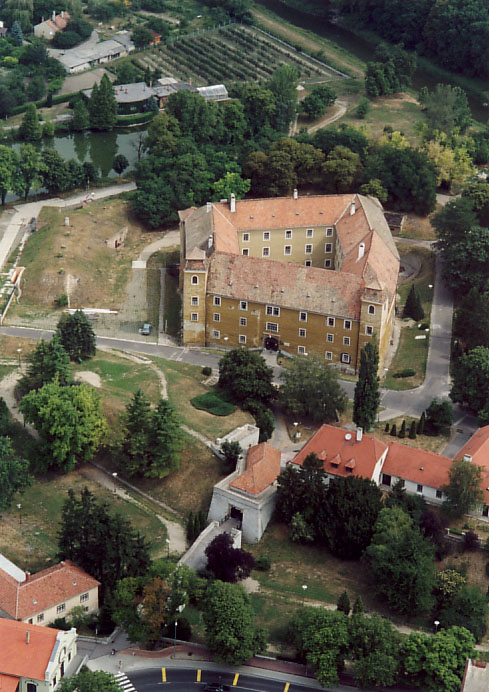
The Castle of Moson

When his grandfather died on May 3, 1270, Béla did not follow the example of his mother and his grandfather’s other partisans (among them Henry Kőszegi), who escaped to the court of her son-in-law, King Otakar II of Bohemia. And indeed, Béla assisted his uncle, King Stephen V against the Czech king and his followers.

And at the Castle of Moson, he /Peter de genere Csák/ rescued Duke Béla (our dear cousin who had been fighting to the best of his ability) from the hands of our enemies who were endeavoring to kill him cruelly with all their might.

— King Ladislaus IV’s Charter of 1274 to Master Peter de genere Csák

After King Stephen V had died on August 6, 1272, and his son, the young Ladislaus IV ascended the throne, King Béla IV’s former partisans (among them Béla’s mother and Henry Kőszegi) returned to Hungary. Thenceforward, several fractions of the leading nobles were competing with each other, and all of them were endeavoring to acquire the control over the government of the kingdom. In November, the members of Henry Kőszegi’s retinue killed Béla (who was the young king’s closest adult male relative at that time) following a sharp dispute.

After his murder, Béla’s domains were divided among the members of the leading noble families.

== Ancestors ==
Ancestors of Béla of Macsó

16. Sviatoslav III Vsevolodovich, grand prince of Kiev
8. Vsevolod IV Sviatoslavich, grand prince of Kiev
17. Maria Vasilkovna of Polotsk
4. Mikhail II Vsevolodovich, grand prince of Kiev
18. Casimir II, prince of Cracow
9. Maria/Anastasia of Poland
19. Helena of Moravia
2. Rostislav Mikhailovich, duke of Macsó
20. Mstislav II Izyaslavich, grand prince of Kiev
10. Roman Mstislavich, prince of Volhynia and Halych
5. Elena/Maria Romanovna of Halych
22. Rurik Rostislavich, grand prince of Kiev
11. Predslava Rurikovna of Kiev
23. Anna Yurievna of Turov
1. Béla of Macsó
24. Béla III, king of Hungary
12. Andrew II, king of Hungary
25. Agnes of Antioch
6. Béla IV, king of Hungary
26. Berthold IV, duke of Merania
13. Gertrude of Merania
27. Agnes of Wettin
3. Anna of Hungary
28. Unknown Laskaris
14. Theodore I, emperor of Nicaea
7. Maria Laskarina
30. Alexios III, emperor of Byzantinum
15. Anna Komnena Angelina
31. Euphrosyne Doukaina Kamatera

== Sources ==
- Bataković, Dušan T., ed. (2005). Histoire du peuple serbe [History of the Serbian People] (in French). Lausanne: L’Age d’Homme. ISBN 9782825119587.
- Bernert, Zsolt; Buzár, Ágota (2018). "80 év után kerültek elő az Árpád-házi herceg elveszettnek hitt csontmaradványai [Bones of the Prince from the House of Árpád, Believed to be Lost, were Rediscovered after 80 Years]". Határtalan Régészet. 3 (4). Móra Ferenc Múzeum: 84–87. ISSN 2416-3074.
- Ćirković, Sima (2004). The Serbs. Malden: Blackwell Publishing. ISBN 9781405142915.
- Engel, Pál (2001). The Realm of St. Stephen: A History of Medieval Hungary, 895-1526. London & New York: I.B.Tauris. ISBN 9781850439776.
- Fine, John Van Antwerp Jr. (1994) [1987]. The Late Medieval Balkans: A Critical Survey from the Late Twelfth Century to the Ottoman Conquest. Ann Arbor, Michigan: University of Michigan Press. ISBN 0472082604.
- Font, Márta (2020). "Rostislav, Dominus de Macho". Stefan the First-Crowned and His Time. Belgrade: Institute of History. pp. 309–326. ISBN 9788677431396.
- Hajdu, Tamás; et al. (2026). "Murder in cold blood? Forensic and bioarchaeological identification of the skeletal remains of Béla, Duke of Macsó (c. 1245–1272)". Forensic Science International: Genetics. 81 103381. doi:10.1016/j.fsigen.2025.103381.
- Isailović, Neven (2016). "Living by the Border: South Slavic Marcher Lords in the Late Medieval Balkans (13th–15th Centuries)". Banatica. 26 (2): 105–117.
- Jireček, Constantin (1911). Geschichte der Serben. Vol. 1. Gotha: Perthes.
- Kádár, Tamás (2009). "Egy rejtélyes politikai gyilkosság és háttere a XIII. század végi Magyarországon: Béla macsói és boszniai herceg pályája [A Mysterious Political Murder and its Background at the End of 13th Century in Hungary: Career of Béla, Duke of Macsó and Bosnia]". Fons. 16 (4). Szentpétery Imre Történettudományi Alapítvány: 411–429. ISSN 1217-8020.
- Kontler, László (1999). Millennium in Central Europe: A History of Hungary. Atlantisz Publishing House. ISBN 963-9165-37-9.
- Kristó, Gyula (1979). A feudális széttagolódás Magyarországon [Feudal Anarchy in Hungary] (in Hungarian). Akadémiai Kiadó. ISBN 963-05-1595-4.
- Kristó, Gyula: Középkori históriák oklevelekben (1002-1410) (Medieval Stories in Royal Charters /1002-1410/); Szegedi Középkorász Műhely in association with the Gondolat Kiadó, 1992, Szeged; ISBN 963-04-1956-4.
- Petrovics, István (1994). "Béla 5. Magyar herceg". In Kristó, Gyula; Engel, Pál; Makk, Ferenc (eds.). Korai magyar történeti lexikon (9–14. század) [Encyclopedia of the Early Hungarian History (9th–14th centuries)] (in Hungarian). Akadémiai Kiadó. p. 93. ISBN 963-05-6722-9.
- Szűcs, Jenő (2002). Az utolsó Árpádok [The Last Árpáds] (in Hungarian). Osiris Kiadó. ISBN 963-389-271-6.
- Ternovácz, Bálint (2017). "A macsói és barancsi területek története 1319-ig [Te Territories of Macsó and Barancs until 1319]". In Fábián, Laura; et al. (eds.). Micae Mediaevales VI (in Hungarian). Eötvös Loránd University. pp. 227–240. ISBN 978-963-284-826-6.
- Zsoldos, Attila (2007). Családi ügy: IV. Béla és István ifjabb király viszálya az 1260-as években [A family affair: The Conflict between Béla IV and Junior King Stephen in the 1260s] (in Hungarian). História, MTA Történettudományi Intézete. ISBN 978-963-9627-15-4.
- Zsoldos, Attila (2011). Magyarország világi archontológiája, 1000–1301 [Secular Archontology of Hungary, 1000–1301] (in Hungarian). História, MTA Történettudományi Intézete. ISBN 978-963-9627-38-3.
- Харди, Ђура (2014). "О смрти господара Мачве кнеза Ростислава Михаилович". Наукові праці Кам'янець-Подільського національного університету імені Івана Огієнка: Історичні науки. Vol. 24. Кам’янець-Подільський. pp. 183–194.

Béla of Macsó Olgovichi Born: after 1243 Died: November 1272
Regnal titles
Preceded by Rostislav	Duke of Macsó; 1262–1272	Succeeded by Roland Rátót as Ban of Macsó
Preceded by Michael	Duke of Bosnia; 1266/1271–1272	Succeeded by Stephen Gutkeled as Ban of Bosnia
