= Rostislav Mikhailovich =

13th-century Rus prince

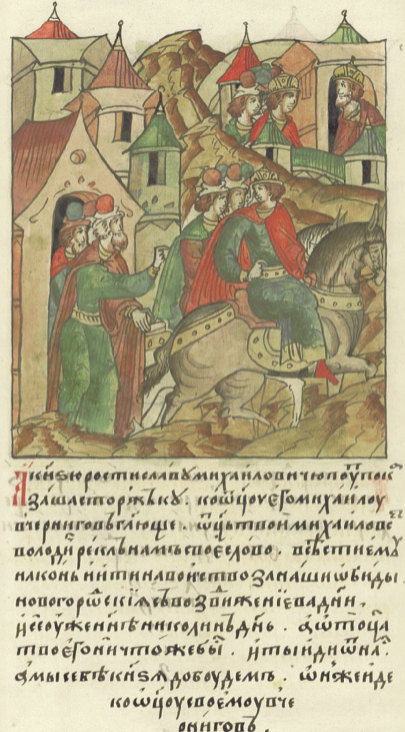
- Rostislav with his retinue, miniature from the Illustrated Chronicle of Ivan the Terrible (16th century)

Duke of Macsó
- Reign: 1254–1262
- Predecessor: new creation
- Successor: Béla
- Born: after 1210
- Died: 1262
- Noble family: Olgovichi
- Spouse: Anna of Hungary
- Issue: See below for issue
- Father: Mikhail Vsevolodovich
- Mother: Elena Romanovna of Halych

The Kievan Rus’ in 1237

Rostislav Mikhailovich (Hungarian: Rosztyiszláv, Bulgarian and Ukrainian: Ростислав Михайлович) (after 1210 / c. 1225 – 1262) was a Rurikid prince and a dignitary in the Kingdom of Hungary.

He was prince of Novgorod (1230), of Halych (1236–1237, 1241–1242), of Lutsk (1240), and of Chernigov (1241–1242). When he could not strengthen his rule in Halych, he went to the court of King Béla IV of Hungary, and married the king's daughter, Anna.

He was the Ban of Slavonia (1247–1248), and later he became the first Duke of Macsó (after 1248–1262), and thus he governed the southern parts of the kingdom. In 1257, he occupied Vidin and thenceforward he styled himself Tsar of Bulgaria.

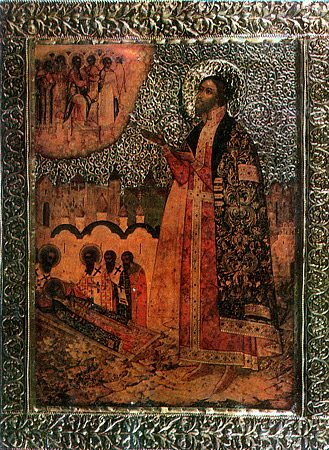
Saint Mikhail of Chernigov (Rostislav's father)

== Marriage and children ==
In 1243, Rostislav married Anna of Hungary (c. 1226 – after 1274), daughter of King Béla IV of Hungary and his wife, Maria Laskarina. Together they had the following children:

- Duke Michael of Bosnia (? – 1271)
- Duke Béla of Macsó (? – November, 1272)
- Unnamed daughter (perhaps Anna), wife firstly of Tsar Michael Asen I of Bulgaria, secondly of Tsar Koloman II of Bulgaria
- Kunigunda (1245 – September 9, 1285), wife firstly of King Ottokar II of Bohemia, and secondly of nobleman Záviš of Falkenštejn (Rosenberg)
- Agrippina (? – May 26, 1303/1309), wife of Prince Leszek II of Cracow

== Sources ==
- Bárány, Attila (2020). "The Relations of King Emeric and Andrew II of Hungary with the Balkan States". Stefan the First-Crowned and His Time. Belgrade: Institute of History. pp. 213–249. ISBN 9788677431396.
- Bataković, Dušan T., ed. (2005). Histoire du peuple serbe [History of the Serbian People] (in French). Lausanne: L’Age d’Homme. ISBN 9782825119587.
- Ćirković, Sima (2004). The Serbs. Malden: Blackwell Publishing. ISBN 9781405142915.
- Dimnik, Martin: The Dynasty of Chernigov - 1146-1246; Cambridge University Press, 2003, Cambridge; ISBN 978-0-521-03981-9.
- Engel, Pál (2001). The Realm of St. Stephen: A History of Medieval Hungary, 895-1526. London & New York: I.B.Tauris. ISBN 9781850439776.
- Fine, John Van Antwerp Jr. (1994) [1987]. The Late Medieval Balkans: A Critical Survey from the Late Twelfth Century to the Ottoman Conquest. Ann Arbor, Michigan: University of Michigan Press. ISBN 0472082604.
- Font, Márta (2020). "Rostislav, Dominus de Macho". Stefan the First-Crowned and His Time. Belgrade: Institute of History. pp. 309–326. ISBN 9788677431396.
- Isailović, Neven (2016). "Living by the Border: South Slavic Marcher Lords in the Late Medieval Balkans (13th–15th Centuries)". Banatica. 26 (2): 105–117.
- Jireček, Constantin (1911). Geschichte der Serben. Vol. 1. Gotha: Perthes.
- Kristó, Gyula: Középkori históriák oklevelekben (1002-1410) (Medieval Stories in Royal Charters /1002-1410/); Szegedi Középkorász Műhely in association with the Gondolat Kiadó, 1992, Szeged; ISBN 963-04-1956-4.
- Kristó, Gyula (General Editor) - Engel, Pál (Editor) - Makk, Ferenc (Editor): Korai magyar történeti lexikon (9-14. század) (Encyclopedia of the Early Hungarian History /9th-14th centuries/); Akadémiai Kiadó, 1994, Budapest; ISBN 963-05-6722-9.
- Voloshchuk, Myroslav (2020). "The Court of Rostyslav Mykhailovych, Prince and Dominus of Machou, in Hungary (An Excerpt from a Family History between the Late 13th and Mid 14th Centuries)". Journal of Vasyl Stefanyk Precarpathian National University. 7 (2): 42–50. doi:10.15330/jpnu.7.2.42-50. S2CID 234590260.
- Zsoldos, Attila: Családi ügy - IV. Béla és István ifjabb király viszálya az 1260-as években (A Family Affair - The Conflict of Béla IV and Junior King Stephen in the 1260s); História - MTA Történettudományi Intézete, 2007, Budapest; ISBN 978-963-9627-15-4.
- Харди, Ђура (2014). "О смрти господара Мачве кнеза Ростислава Михаилович". Наукові праці Кам'янець-Подільського національного університету імені Івана Огієнка: Історичні науки. Vol. 24. Кам’янець-Подільський. pp. 183–194.

Rostislav Mikhailovich Olgovichi Born: after 1210 Died: 1262
Regnal titles
Preceded by Mikhail I Vsevolodovich	Prince of Novgorod; 1230	Succeeded by Yaroslav V Vsevolodovich
Preceded by Mikhail I Vsevolodovich	Prince of Halych; 1236–1237	Succeeded by Daniil Romanovich
Preceded by (part of the Principality of Volhynia)	Prince of Lutsk; 1240	Succeeded by (part of the Principality of Volhynia)
Preceded by Mstislav III Glebovich	Prince of Chernigov; 1241–1242	Succeeded by Mikhail I Vsevolodovich
Preceded by Daniil Romanovich	Prince of Halych; 1241–1242	Succeeded by Daniil Romanovich
Preceded by Ladislaus Kán	Ban of Slavonia; 1247–1248	Succeeded by Stephen Gutkeled
Preceded by New creation	Duke of Macsó; 1254–1262	Succeeded by Béla
