= Nicholas of Poland =

Polish friar and healer

Nicholas of Poland, also known as Nicholas of Montpellier (Polish: Mikołaj z Polski) (c. 1235, in Silesia – c. 1316, in Kraków), was a medieval Polish-German friar and healer of Silesian origin. A member of the Dominican Order, around 1250 he moved to Montpellier, where he taught in the Dominican school. Around 1270, he returned to Silesia and entered the Dominican convent at Kraków (Cracow), where he provided medical as well as spiritual care to the people.

A popular and charismatic healer, Nicholas was the focus of an ‘alternative’ medical movement that flourished in Upper Silesia in the late-thirteenth century. He was also a favorite in the court of Leszek the Black (Lestko Nigritius), the duke of Sieradz. Nicholas’s methods were extremely unorthodox. Urging a return to ‘natural’ methods of healing, he attributed extraordinary virtues to toads, scorpions, and lizards. His favorite remedy was serpents’ flesh prepared according to detailed instructions contained in his treatise, Experimenta magistri Nicolai (Master Nicholas’s Experiments), a compilation of his medicaments. He urged all people, "of whatever station, to eat serpents whenever it is possible to get them." Evidently impressed by Nicholas’s doctrine, Leszek ordered that serpents, lizards, and frogs be served at his court.

Nicholas was educated at Montpellier during a period when Scholastic medicine was highly developed. However, Nicholas appears to have rejected the academic medical tradition, opting instead for an 'empirical' medical system. His drugs were based upon the principle that God had conferred 'marvelous' virtues on common things like serpents and toads. In fact, he believed, the more common the object, the more precious were its medicinal virtues. Hence, remedies made of contemptible creatures contained greater medicinal virtues than such ‘precious' drugs like theriac (which to Nicholas was just snake meat). Nicholas invoked the authority of ‘master Albert’ to confirm his doctrine, a reference to the popular De mirabilibus mundi (On the Miracles of the World) attributed to Albertus Magnus.

== Publications ==
- Brata Mikołaja z Polski Pisma Lekarskie, ed. Ryszard Ganszyniec (Posen,1920).
- "Les 'Experimenta magistri Nicolai'," ed. John W. S. Johnsson, Bulletin de la société français d’histoire de la medicine 10 (1911):269-90.
- Karl Sudhoff, "Antipocras, Streitschrift für mystische Heilkunde in Versen des Magisters Nikolaus von Polen," Sudhoffs Archiv 9 (1916):31-52.
- W. Eamon and G. Keil, "Plebs amat empirica: Nicholas of Poland and His Critique of the Medieval Medical Establishment," Sudhoffs Archiv 71 (1987):180-96.
- G. Keil, "Nikolaus von Polen," in Die deutsche Literatur des Mittelalters. Verfasserlexikon, 6:1128-1133.
- ANTIPOCRAS. A Medieval Treatise on Magical Medicine. By Brother Nicholas of the Preaching Friars (c. 1270). Translated by William Eamon
