= Second Mongol invasion of Hungary =

1285–6 military campaign

- Part of Mongol invasion of Europe
- Mongols in Hungary, 1285 depicted in the Illuminated Chronicle. The dismounted Mongols, with captured women, are on the left, and the Hungarians, with one saved woman, are on the right.
Date	1285–1286
Location	Kingdom of Hungary
Result	Hungarian victory
Territorial changes	Golden Horde invasion repelled

Belligerents
Golden Horde (Mongols); Kingdom of Galicia-Volhynia	Kingdom of Hungary

Commanders and leaders
Nogai Khan; Talabuga; Leo I of Galicia	King Ladislaus IV; Roland Borsa; George Baksa; Amadeus Aba; Peter Aba; Ivánka Aba †

Strength
30,000–200,000	~30,000

Casualties and losses
Nearly entire force	Light

The second invasion of the Kingdom of Hungary by the Mongols took place during the winter of 1285–1286. The Mongols were led by Nogai Khan and Tulabuga of the Golden Horde. Local forces resisted the invaders at many places, including, for example, at Regéc. The invasion lasted for two months before the Mongols withdrew.

== Prelude ==
=== The first invasion ===
In 1241, a Mongol army under Subutai and Batu Khan invaded central and eastern Europe, including Poland, Bulgaria, Croatia, and the Kingdom of Hungary. The Hungarian attempt to halt the invasion at the Battle of Mohi failed catastrophically. The light cavalry that made up most of the Hungarian mounted forces had proven ineffective against the Mongol troops, though the few heavily armored knights (mostly those of the Knights Templar) performed significantly better when engaged in close quarters combat. The Mongols decisively crushed the Hungarian army, and proceeded to ravage the countryside for the next year. By the end of their campaign, the king was put to flight, around a quarter of the population of Hungary had been killed, and most of the kingdom's major settlements had been reduced to rubble.

=== Reforms under Bela IV ===
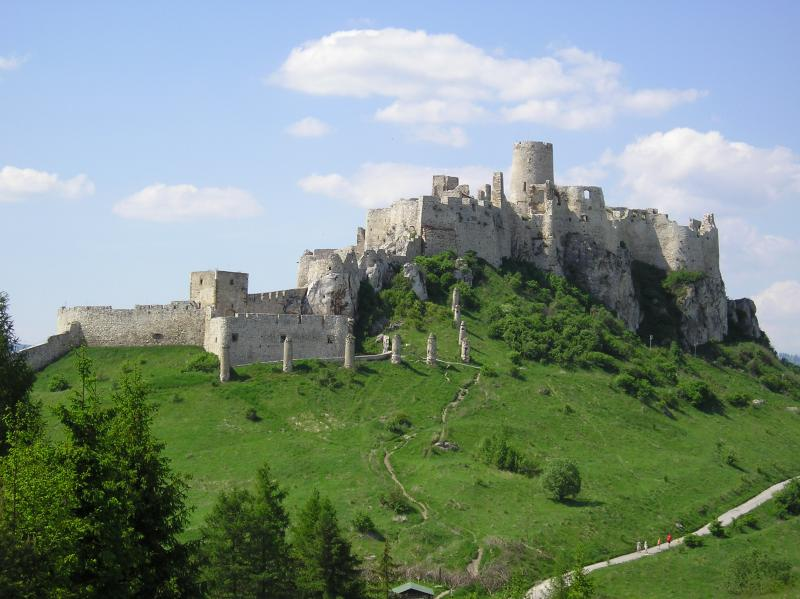
The Mongol invasion in the 13th century led to construction of mighty stone castles, such as Spiš Castle (Hungarian: Szepesvár), today in Slovakia.

King Béla IV spent the next few decades reforming Hungary after his return from his flight. First and foremost, he amalgamated the servientes and iobagiones castri into a new class of heavily armored, well-trained knights of the western type, where previously Hungary's defenses had relied almost entirely on wooden castles and light cavalry. In 1247 he concluded a feudal agreement with the Knights of St. John, giving them the southeastern borderland in exchange for their help in creating more armored cavalry and fortifications. In 1248, he declared the country's middle strata could enter a baron's service, on the condition that the barons lead the men on his land properly equipped (in armor) into the king's army. Documents from the time state that "the nobles of our country can enter into military service of bishops in the same way in which they can serve other nobles". After 1250, free owners of small or middle sized estates serving directly under the king were included (along with barons) in the nobility. Finally, new settlers were given "conditional" nobility in exchange for the requirement of fighting mounted and armored at the king's request. In 1259, he requested that the Pope put him into contact with Venice, as he wanted to hire at least 1,000 crossbowmen (crossbows having also proven a very effective weapon against the Mongols, despite the relatively small numbers of them actually deployed by the Hungarians in 1241).

Some historians claims that Béla IV undertook reforms in castle construction in response to the first invasion. By the end of his reign, he had overseen the building of nearly 100 new fortresses. This was a major upgrade from 1241, when the kingdom only possessed 10 stone castles, half of which were placed along the border with the Duchy of Austria. During the first invasion the wooden, clay, and earth defenses that made up the walls of most towns and forts fell easily to the Mongol siege engines. One German chronicler observed that the Hungarians "had almost no city protected by walls or strong fortresses". Some modern historians have claimed that well-fortified castles posed a significant challenge to the Mongol army. For example, the failed siege of the Fortress of Klis is used to support the superiority of stone castles while it is often disregarded that the attackers almost took the castle and that fighting was held on its walls, with the siege ending only when the Mongols realized Béla was not in the castle. Other historians highlighted the skill of siege warfare of the Mongol army against similar fortifications. Rather, the movement speed of the Mongol troops and the hunt for the Hungarian king did not open up possibilities for longer sieges. The construction of new castles was promoted by the development of medieval society, the rise of nobility, territorial organization and estate development, but also in the consistent policy that the Hungarian kings had towards their western neighbors.

=== Lead-up to the second invasion ===
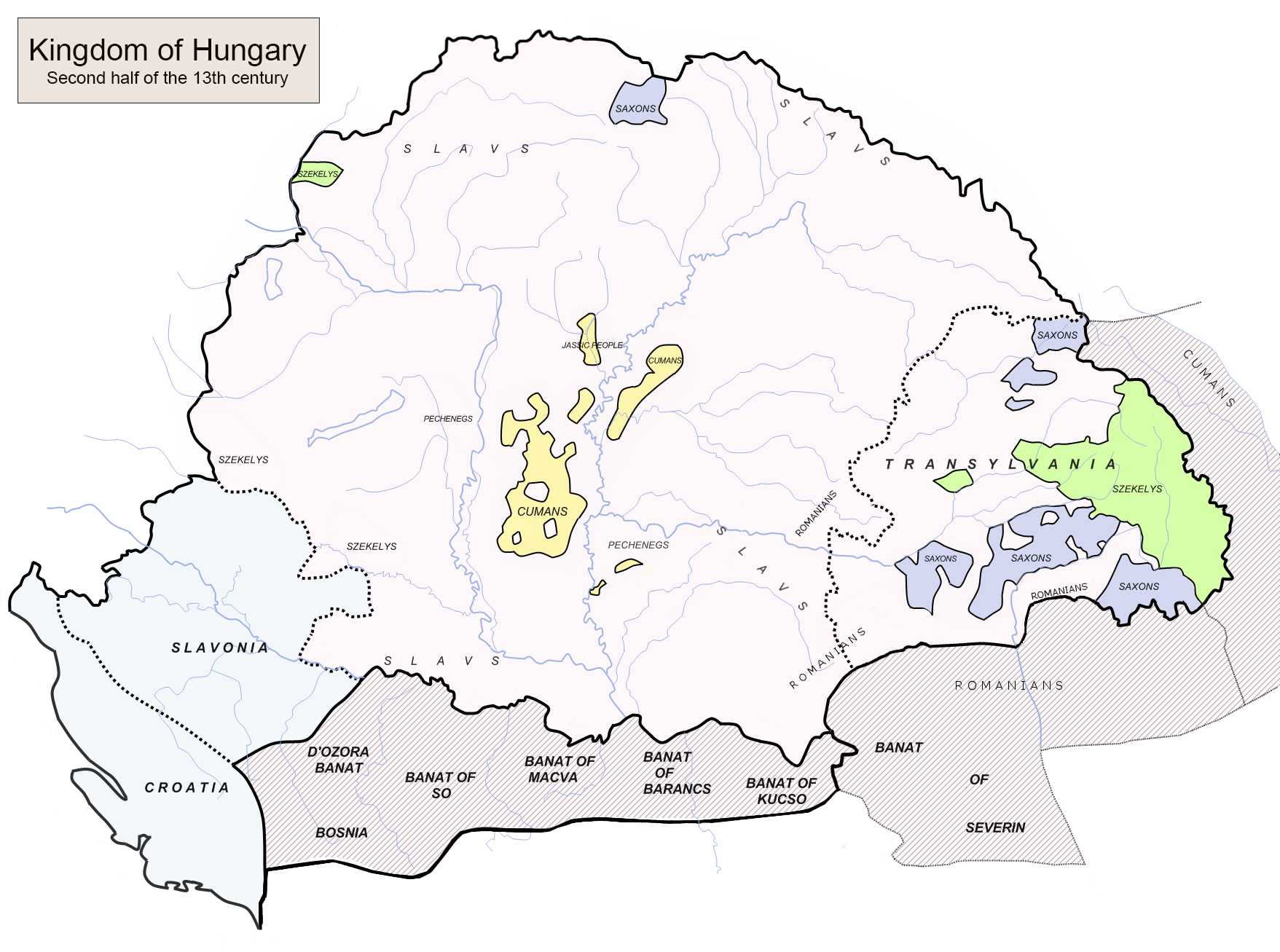
Kingdom of Hungary in the second half of the 13th century

In 1254, Batu Khan demanded a marriage alliance with Hungary and a quarter of its army for a drive into central and western Europe. In exchange, Hungary would be spared from tribute obligations and any further destruction. Béla ignored the message. Additional ultimatums were sent in 1259 and 1264, this time by Batu's brother and successor, Berke Khan. Berke made similar demands: if Hungary would submit to the Mongols and grant them a quarter of its army for the planned invasion of Europe, it would receive tax exemption and 1/5 of the plunder. Again, Béla refused. Letters exchanged between Béla and the Pope circa 1259 imply that the Mongols had been well known to be untrustworthy for decades, with the Pope saying that any agreements made by the "perfidious" conquerors were worthless.

After the deaths of the kings Béla IV and Stephen V, Ladislaus IV assumed the Hungarian throne in 1272. Under the maternal influence, he became known as the Ladislaus the Cuman. In the next years, his resistance against the nobles and clerics became stronger, to the point that he arrested a papal legate over a law requiring the pagan Cumans convert to Christianity and imprisoned his Christian wife, Isabel of Anjou. The barons raised an army and Lodomer, Archbishop of Esztergom declared a crusade against the Hungarian king. However, when the Cumans rebelled and invaded Hungary in 1282, Ladislaus and his nobles did not hesitate to crush the rebellion. The Illuminated Chronicle writes that Ladislaus, "like the brave Joshua, went out against" the Cumans "to fight for his people and his realm," defeating the Cuman army at Lake Hód, near Hódmezővásárhely.

Despite this, the king's reputation especially among his nobles remained very poor. In 1283 he settled among his Cuman subjects after abandoning his wife, and took Cuman women as his mistresses. The 1282 Cuman rebellion may have catalyzed the Mongol invasion. Cuman warriors driven out of Hungary offered their services to Nogai Khan, de facto head of the Golden Horde, and told him about the perilous political situation in Hungary. Seeing this as an opportunity, Nogai decided to start a vast campaign against the apparently weak kingdom.

== Invasion ==
=== Forces ===
In the winter of 1285, Mongol armies invaded Hungary for a second time. As in the first invasion in 1241, Mongols invaded Hungary in two fronts. Nogai invaded via Transylvania, while Töle-Buka (Talabuga) invaded via Transcarpathia and Moravia. A third, smaller force likely entered the center of the kingdom, mirroring Kadan's earlier route. The invasion paths seemed to mirror those taken by Batu and Subutai 40 years earlier, with Talabuga going through Verecke Pass and Nogai going through Brassó to enter Transylvania. Much like the first invasion, the Mongols emphasized speed and surprise and intended to destroy the Hungarian forces in detail, invading in winter in the hope of catching the Hungarians off guard and moving fast enough that it was impossible (at least until their later setbacks) for Ladislaus to gather enough men to engage them in a decisive confrontation. However, due to the anarchy in the kingdom and the commonplace practice of resolving differences through violence by the barons, the local armies were well trained and swift. The Golden Horde's rapprochement with the Yuan dynasty and Ilkhanate perhaps gave them more security to devote forces to Europe, with the Galician-Volhynian Chronicle describing it as "a great host" but its exact size isn't certain. It is known that the Mongol host included cavalry from their vassals, the Ruthenian princes, including Lev Danylovych and others from among their Rus′ satellites.

Stefan Krakowski indirectly places the Mongol invasion force a fair bit above 30,000 men by estimating the smaller Mongol invasion of Poland two years later as having about that many soldiers, stating that Nogai and Talabuga personally leading an invasion suggests it is a massive force by definition. German and Hungarian sources describe the number of invading Mongol forces as considerable, and a contemporary letter from Benedict, the provost of Esztergom, estimates the size of the Mongol army at 200,000. However this is almost certainly an exaggeration. The Galician-Volhynian Chronicle puts the size of the Mongol army in the hundreds of thousands, saying that Talabuga's column alone lost 100,000 men during the march through the Carpathians. The Austrian chronicler of Salzburg recorded that the Mongol military camp covered an area of 16 km (10 mi) in width and 10 km (6 mi) in depth (whether this was Nogai's or Talabuga's army, or how this chronicler got his information, is unknown).

In 1255, William of Rubruck wrote that the Hungarians could gather at most 30,000 soldiers, a situation that probably hadn't drastically changed in the last three decades. It is unknown how many of these men were mustered during the period of the Mongol invasion.

=== Central/Northern Hungary, Transcarpathia, and Western Transylvania ===
Talabuga, who led the main army in Northern Hungary, was stopped by the heavy snow of the Carpathians. On the march up, his force was devastated by logistical factors, namely a shortage of food which caused the deaths of thousands of his soldiers, as attested to by the Galician-Volynian Chronicle and certain contemporary Polish sources. This was likely the result of the traditional tactics of castle warfare, which involve starving out the invaders by hoarding all available food stocks, while launching small raids and sallies from the castles. Polish chroniclers hostile to the Hungarian king stated that Ladislaus was too cowardly to face the Mongols in a straight battle, very likely a misinterpretation of successful battle avoidance and scorched earth tactics. In addition to famine, Polish sources also allege that the Mongols had been struck by an epidemic of some sort.

At the beginning of the campaign the invading force devastated central Hungary and entered the town of Pest. They burned it, but the town had long since been abandoned by its population, who fled south and west of the Danube. During this event, members of Queen Elizabeth's household launched a spirited and effective sally against the Mongols, while she watched from the safety of the walls of Buda. Talabuga's forces encountered great difficulties with the density of fortifications and failed to capture any castles or fortified cities. However, they caused major damage to the civilian population, and raided as far as the Danube. Local Hungarian forces fought the Mongols in many defensive battles, for which the king had promoted several lesser officials who had distinguished themselves, including George Baksa, Amadeus Aba his relative, Peter Aba from the clan's Somos branch. The armies led by Roland Borsa, Amadeus Aba, George Baksa, and Peter of Sáros were able to disperse the invading forces and rescue most of the prisoners. The Trascău fortress, defended by the Székelys in the Arieș region, withstood multiple assaults by the Mongols. Talabuga's army was constantly ambushed and harassed by local forces. His weakened army retreated before the army of Ladislaus IV, which had amassed on the western bank of the Danube. Other sources also state that Talabuga's army was defeated in a head on battle or that Talabuga signed a peace treaty with Ladislaus before retreating. According to Tudor Sălăgean, the invasion was repelled by mostly local forces who received little help from the king.

During the retreat, Talabuga's forces were decimated by the freezing weather and was reduced to starvation, eating their mounts, dogs, and dead soldiers. Once he finally reached Volynia, his starving soldiers plundered the towns of his allies and vassals.

=== Transylvania and the Hungarian Plains ===
Nogai stayed in Transylvania until the spring of 1286. Here he plundered some towns and villages, such as Szászrégen (Reghin), Brassó (Braşov) and Beszterce (Bistrița). He also managed to destroy a few forts and walled towns. However, like Talabuga, he failed to take any major fortifications, with the exception of the Saxon castle of Ban Mikod in the Aranyos (Arieș) Valley, the former royal stronghold of Torda (today Turda, Romania). The castle was destroyed. After the defeat of Talabuga's main column, King Ladislaus IV led an expedition to expel Nogai's forces from Transylvania. His army arrived too late to make a significant difference, as Nogai's forces had already suffered a serious defeat at the hands of local Hungarian troops—mostly the Saxons, Vlachs, and Székelys, commanded by Voivode Roland Borsa. Ladislaus settled for harassing their withdrawal.

== Aftermath ==
The invasion ravaged eastern Hungary and reached as far as the Pest. According to the Illuminated Chronicle, the invaders "spread a terrible devastation of fire throughout the whole country" to the east of the Danube. The invasion lasted for two months before the Mongols withdrew. The war was a political disaster for the king. Like his grandfather before him, many nobles accused him of inviting the Mongols into his lands, due to his perceived ties to the Cumans. Possibly more disastrously, the invasion was fended off by local barons and other magnates with little help from the king. After proving their military skills, the efficiency of their fortifications and armed forces, and their ability to ensure the safety of their subjects to a greater degree than the king or his dignitaries, various local elites expanded their net of supporters and deemed themselves entitled to rule large regions of the kingdom. The crisis brought to light the king's lack of significant military resources and inability to compensate for such via political skills.

The heavy losses suffered by the Mongols in this war, combined with their defeat in Poland shortly after (though they did successfully re-vassalize Bulgaria between these expeditions), contributed to the lack of major Golden Horde operations in central Europe outside of the 1280s. From then on, Mongol attacks on Hungary and Transylvania would be limited to raids and pillaging along the frontier lines. By the 14th century, the Golden Horde and much of the Mongolian Empire posed no serious threats thereafter to Hungary, despite frontier raids continuing under Öz Beg Khan. In fact, in 1345, a Hungarian army under Count Andrew Lackfi took the initiative and launched an invasion force into Mongolian territory, defeating a Golden Horde force and capturing what would become Moldavia.
