= Duchy of Łęczyca =

Polish duchy (1231–1352)

Duchy of Łęczyca Księstwo łęczyckie (pl)
- 1231–1352
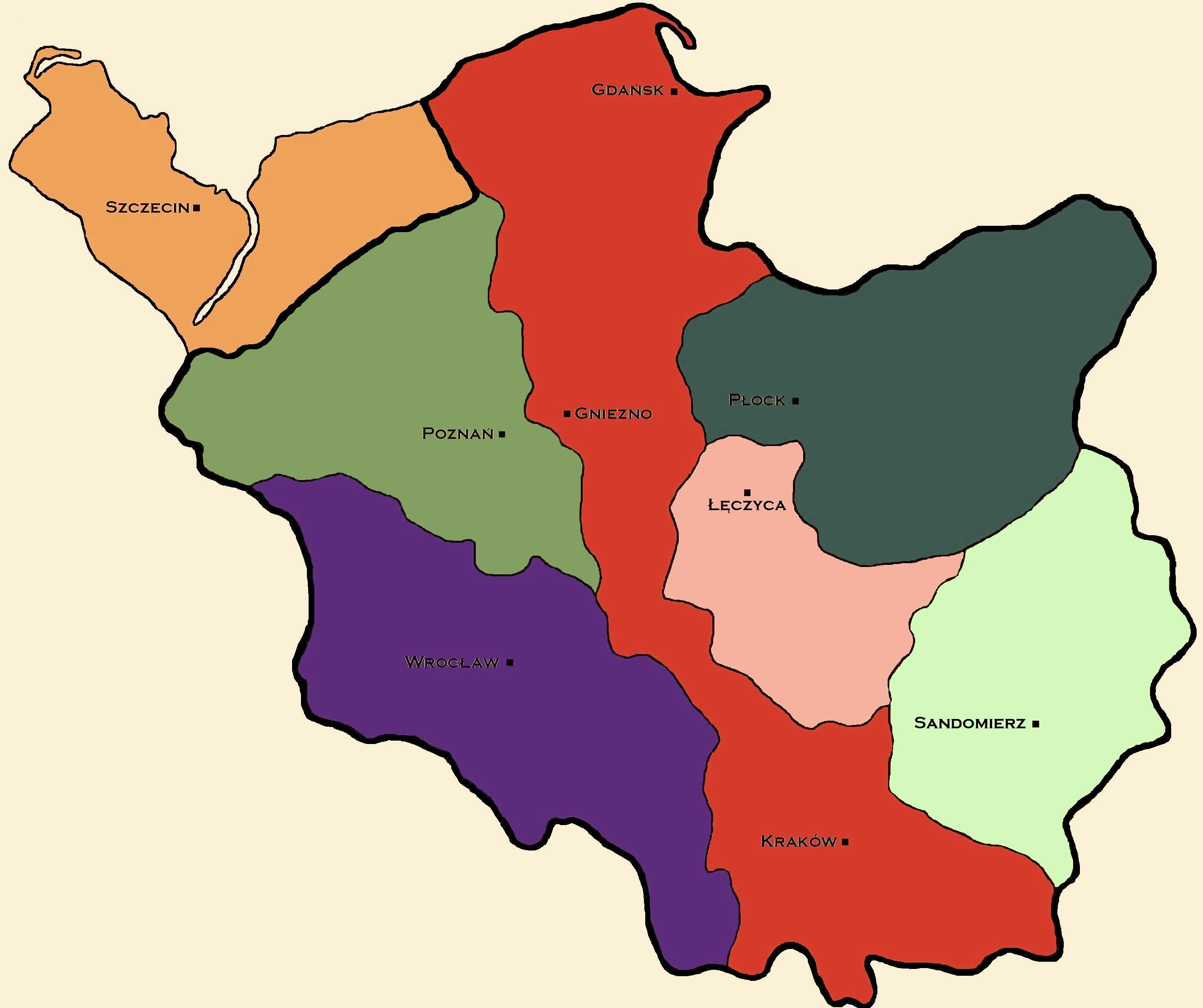
- The Fragmentation of the Poland in 1138: Seniorate Province (Łęczyca Province replaced in 1231 by the Duchy of Łęczyca; the area corresponds to borders of the Duchy of Łęczyca in years 1231-1263)

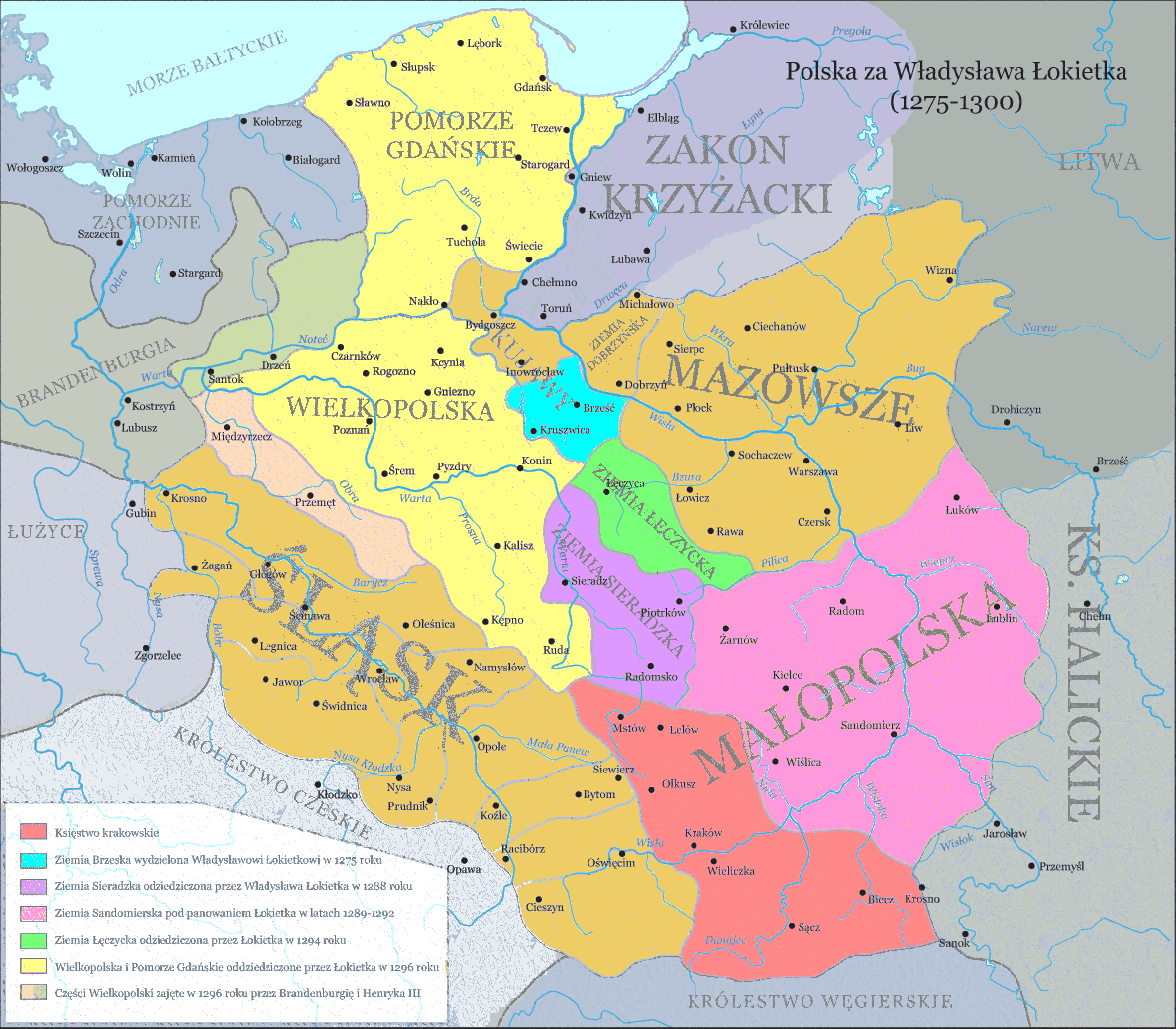
- Poland 1275-1300, Duchy of Łęczyca marked in violet (area of the Duchy of Łęczyca in years 1263-1352 was as shown in the map)
- Status: Province of Poland
- Capital: Łęczyca
- Religion: Roman Catholic
- Government: Duchy
- Historical era: High Middle Ages
  - Established: 1231
  - Split off Sieradz: 1264
  - Incorporated by the Polish Kingdom: 1352
Succeeded by
Łęczyca Voivodeship
- Today part of: Poland

Duchy of Łęczyca (Polish: Księstwo łęczyckie) was one of the duchies of Poland. It was created around 1231 from Province of Łęczyca, a part of the Seniorate Province by Konrad I of Masovia. Province of Łęczyca existed since turn of the 11th/12th century.

In 1264 the Duchy of Sieradz was split from it. The last duke of this duchy was Władysław the Hunchback. After his death in 1352 the duchy became part of the Kingdom of Poland and was reorganized into the Łęczyca Voivodeship.
