= Duchy of Sieradz =

Polish duchy (1263–1339)

Duchy of Sieradz Duchy of Siradia Księstwo sieradzkie (pl) ducatus Siradiae (la)
- 1263–1339
- Coat of arms

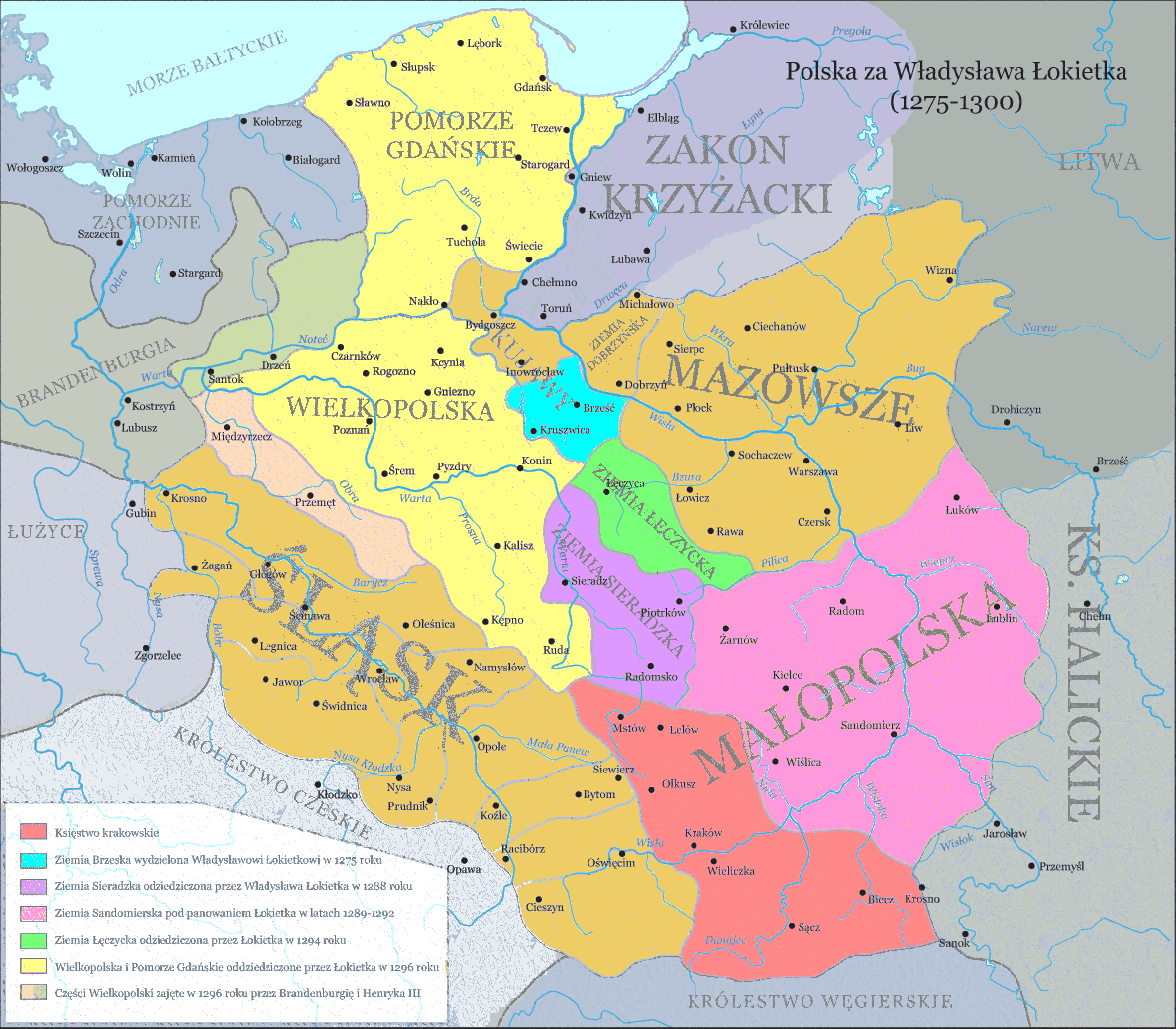
- Poland 1275-1300, Duchy of Sieradz marked in violet
- Status: Province of Poland; Fiefdom of the Polish Crown (from 1306)
- Capital: Sieradz
- Religion: Roman Catholic
- Government: Duchy
- Historical era: Middle Ages
  - Established: 1263
  - Ruled by Bohemia: 1299
  - Vassalized by the Polish Crown: 1305
  - Incorporated by Poland: 1339
Preceded by	Succeeded by
Duchy of Kuyavia	Sieradz Voivodeship

The Duchy of Sieradz (Latin: ducatus Siradiae, Polish: Księstwo Sieradzkie), also known as the Duchy of Siradia, was created based on part of the Duchy of Łęczyca in 1263. Duchy of Łęczyca was created around 1231 from Province of Łęczyca, a part of the Seniorate Province by Konrad I of Masovia.

Ruled by the rivaling Masovian branch of the Piast dynasty. In 1299 Duke Władysław I the Elbow-high had to cede Sieradz to King Wenceslaus II of Bohemia, who had also obtained the Seniorate Duchy of Kraków in 1291. Nevertheless, upon the extinction of the Bohemian Přemyslid dynasty in 1306, it was reunited with the Kingdom of Poland as a vassal duchy, and after 1339 incorporated by King Casimir III the Great into the Lands of the Polish Crown as Sieradz Voivodship. Around that time, the term Sieradz Land (Terra Siradiensis, ziemia sieradzka) begun replacing the older Duchy nomenclature.

The importance of the territory is reflected in the Latin title of Polish kings: nec non terrarum Cracovie, Sandomirrie, Lancicie, Cuyavie, Syradziensis dux.

== Dukes of Sieradz ==
- 1264–1288 Leszek II the Black, son of Casimir, also Duke of Kraków from 1279
- 1288–1299 Władysław I the Elbow-high, younger half-brother, Duke of Kraków from 1306, King of Poland from 1320
- 1299–1305 King Wenceslaus II of Bohemia, Duke of Kraków from 1291, King of Poland from 1300
- 1305–1306 King Wenceslaus III of Bohemia, also King of Poland
- 1306–1327 Władysław I the Elbow-high, again, also Duke of Kraków from 1306, King of Poland from 1320
- 1327–1339 Przemysł of Inowrocław, son of Duke Ziemomysł of Kuyavia
