= Podhradík =

Village and municipality in Slovakia

- Municipality
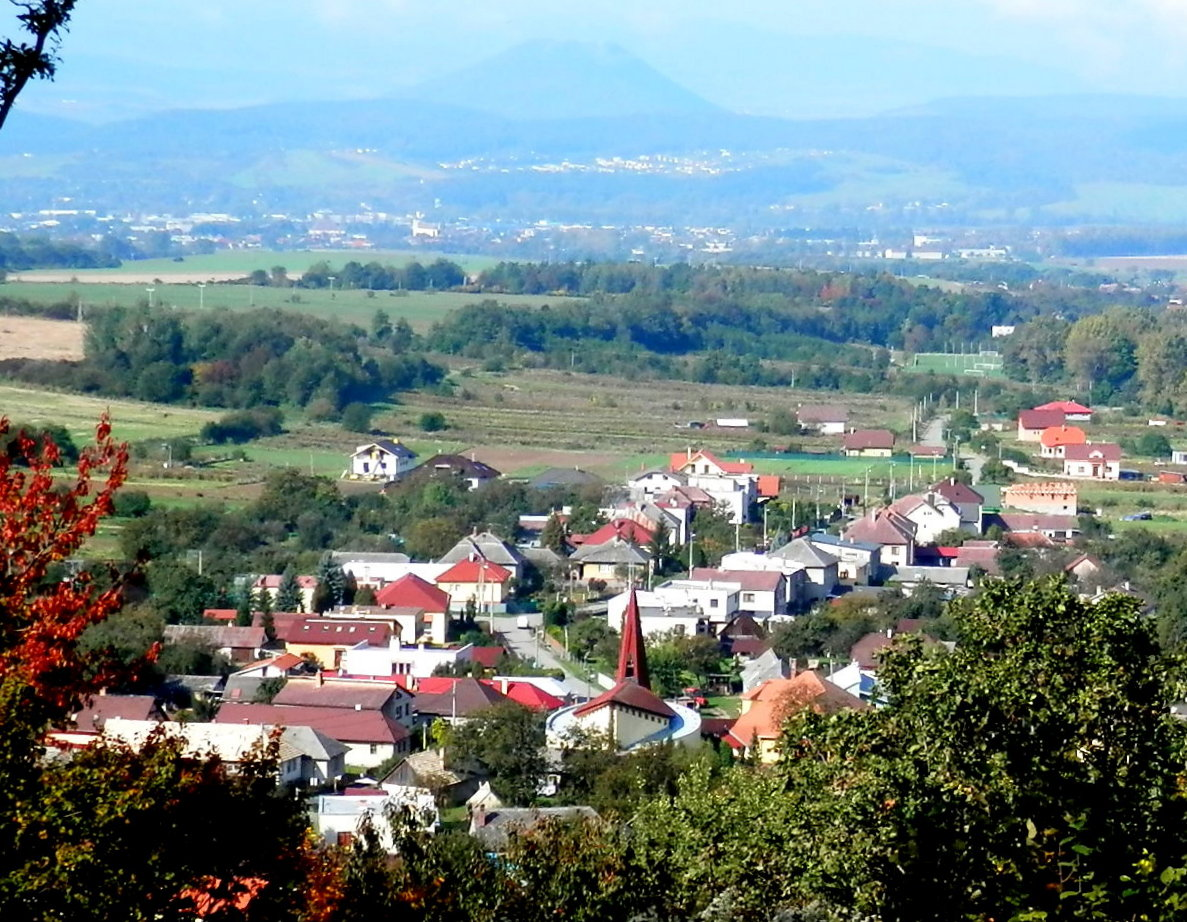

- Flag

- Location of Podhradík in the Prešov Region Location of Podhradík in Slovakia
- Coordinates: 49.02°N 21.35°E
- Country: Slovakia
- Region: Prešov Region
- District: Prešov District
- First mentioned: 1427

Area
  - Total: 10.56 km^{2} (4.08 sq mi)
- Elevation: 444 m (1,457 ft)

Population (2025)
  - Total: 434
- Time zone: UTC+1 (CET)
  - Summer (DST): UTC+2 (CEST)
- Postal code: 800 6
- Area code: +421 51
- Vehicle registration plate (until 2022): PO
- Website: www.podhradik.sk

Podhradík is a village and municipality in Prešov District in the Prešov Region of eastern Slovakia.

== History ==
In historical records the village was first mentioned in 1427.

== Geography ==
The municipality lies at an altitude of 444 metres (1,457 ft) and covers an area of 10.56 km^{2} (4.08 sq mi) (2025).

== Population ==
Population statistic (10 years)
Year	1995	2005	2015	2025
Count	331	359	379	434
Difference		+8.45%	+5.57%	+14.51%

Population statistic
Year	2024	2025
Count	434	434
Difference		+0%

It has a population of 434 people (31 December 2025).

=== Ethnicity ===
Census 2021 (1+ %)
Ethnicity	Number	Fraction
Slovak	408	97.6%
Ukrainian	7	1.67%
Rusyn	5	1.19%
Total	418	

In year 2021 was 418 people by ethnicity 408 as Slovak, 7 as Ukrainian, 5 as Rusyn, 3 as Canadian, 2 as Russian, 2 as Not found out, 2 as Other, 1 as Czech and 1 as Greek.

Note on population: The difference values of population numbers in the table "Population statistic" and in the sections "Ethnicity" & "Religion" is caused by the use of various statistical methods.

=== Religion ===
Census 2021 (1+ %)
Religion	Number	Fraction
Roman Catholic Church	316	75.6%
Evangelical Church	39	9.33%
None	35	8.37%
Greek Catholic Church	17	4.07%
Total	418	

In year 2021 was 418 people by religion 316 from Roman Catholic Church, 39 from Evangelical Church, 35 from None, 17 from Greek Catholic Church, 3 from Christian Congregations in Slovakia, 2 from Eastern Orthodox Church, 2 from United Methodist Church, 2 from Ad hoc movements, 1 from Not found out and 1 from Other.
