= Ruská Nová Ves =

- Municipality
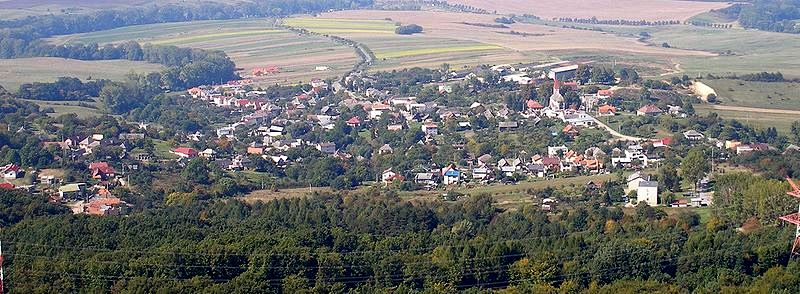

- Flag

- Location of Ruská Nová Ves in the Prešov Region Location of Ruská Nová Ves in Slovakia
- Coordinates: 48.98°N 21.33°E
- Country: Slovakia
- Region: Prešov Region
- District: Prešov District
- First mentioned: 1423

Area
  - Total: 12.57 km^{2} (4.85 sq mi)
- Elevation: 418 m (1,371 ft)

Population (2025)
  - Total: 1,420
- Time zone: UTC+1 (CET)
  - Summer (DST): UTC+2 (CEST)
- Postal code: 800 5
- Area code: +421 51
- Vehicle registration plate (until 2022): PO
- Website: www.ruskanovaves.sk

Ruská Nová Ves (Hungarian: Sósújfalu) is a village and municipality in Prešov District in the Prešov Region of eastern Slovakia.

== History ==
In historical records the village was first mentioned in 1423.

== Geography ==
The municipality lies at an altitude of 418 metres (1,371 ft) and covers an area of 12.57 km^{2} (4.85 sq mi) (2025).

== Population ==
Population statistic (10 years)
Year	1995	2005	2015	2025
Count	865	1009	1175	1420
Difference		+16.64%	+16.45%	+20.85%

Population statistic
Year	2024	2025
Count	1398	1420
Difference		+1.57%

It has a population of 1420 people (31 December 2025).

=== Ethnicity ===
Census 2021 (1+ %)
Ethnicity	Number	Fraction
Slovak	1229	94.17%
Not found out	63	4.82%
Romani	38	2.91%
Rusyn	32	2.45%
Total	1305	

In year 2021 was 1305 people by ethnicity 1229 as Slovak, 63 as Not found out, 38 as Romani, 32 as Rusyn, 6 as Ukrainian, 5 as Czech, 4 as Hungarian, 4 as English, 3 as Irish, 3 as German, 1 as Italian, 1 as Russian, 1 as Austrian, 1 as Polish and 1 as Other.

Note on population: The difference values of population numbers in the table "Population statistic" and in the sections "Ethnicity" & "Religion" is caused by the use of various statistical methods.

=== Religion ===
Census 2021 (1+ %)
Religion	Number	Fraction
Roman Catholic Church	561	42.99%
Greek Catholic Church	479	36.7%
None	139	10.65%
Not found out	56	4.29%
Eastern Orthodox Church	24	1.84%
Evangelical Church	15	1.15%
Total	1305	

In year 2021 was 1305 people by religion 561 from Roman Catholic Church, 479 from Greek Catholic Church, 139 from None, 56 from Not found out, 24 from Eastern Orthodox Church, 15 from Evangelical Church, 10 from Christian Congregations in Slovakia, 6 from Apostolic Church, 4 from Seventh-day Adventist Church, 4 from Ad hoc movements, 3 from Jehovah's Witnesses, 1 from Calvinist Church, 1 from Paganism and natural spirituality, 1 from Other and 1 from Buddhism.
