= Leszek II the Black =

High Duke of Poland from 1279 to 1288

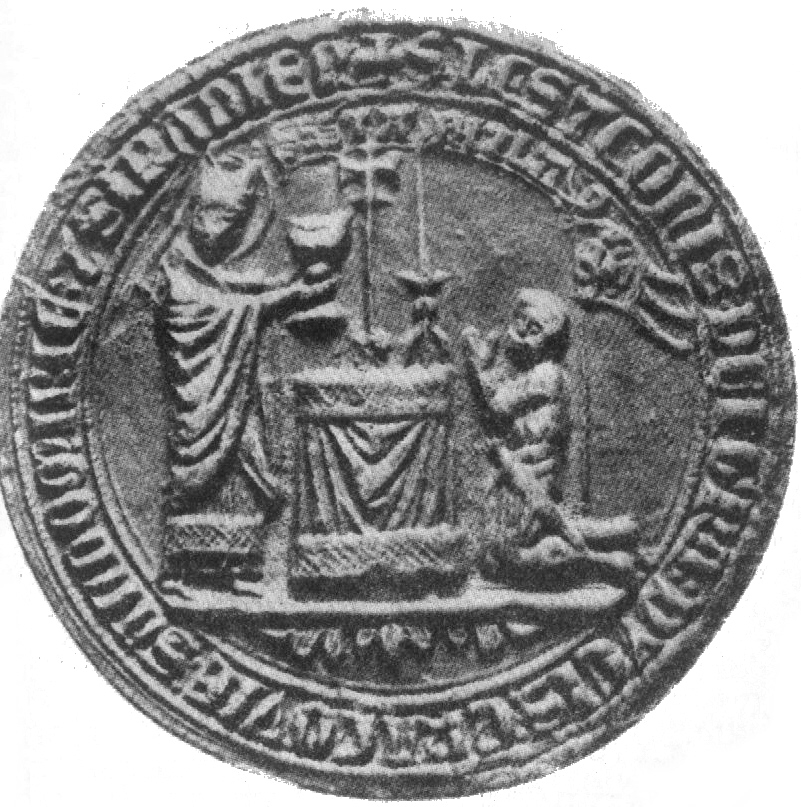
- Seal featuring Leszek the Black kneeling before Saint Stanislaus, 1281–1288

High Duke of Poland
- Reign: 1279 – 1288
- Predecessor: Bolesław V the Chaste
- Successor: Henryk Probus
- Born: c. 1241; Brześć Kujawski
- Died: 30 September 1288 (aged 46–47); Kraków
- Burial: Dominican Church of the Holy Trinity, Kraków
- Spouse: Gryfina of Halych
- House: House of Piast
- Father: Casimir I of Kuyavia
- Mother: Constance of Wrocław

Leszek II the Black (c. 1241 – 30 September 1288) was a Polish prince of the House of Piast, Duke of Sieradz since 1261, Duke of Łęczyca since 1267, Duke of Inowrocław from 1273 to 1278, Duke of Sandomierz and High Duke of Poland from 1279 until his death.

== Early years ==
Leszek was the eldest son of Duke Casimir I of Kuyavia and his second wife, Constance, daughter of Henry II the Pious from the Silesian branch of the Piast dynasty. His nickname, Black (Latin: Niger), appears for the first time in the 14th century Kronika Dzierzwy, and was probably given to him for his dark hair.

In 1257, his mother died, and shortly after, his father married Euphrosyne, daughter of Casimir I of Opole. Leszek's stepmother soon caused conflicts in the family with her attempts to obtain territorial benefits for her own children. The eldest of them was the future Polish king Władysław I Łokietek. This was to the detriment of Leszek and his younger full-brother, Ziemomysł. Some chronicles even accused Euphrosyne of attempting to poison both stepsons. Leszek and Ziemomysł rebelled against their father and stepmother in 1261 (although the participation of Ziemomysł is debated in historiography). The revolt initially failed because the local nobility, dissatisfied with their adventurous policy, retired their support; however, thanks to the help of a coalition formed with Bolesław V the Chaste, Siemowit I of Masovia, and Bolesław the Pious, Leszek eventually forced his father to give him the district of Sieradz as a separate duchy.

== Duke of Sieradz ==
Leszek's rule as Duke of Sieradz lasted from 1261 until 1279. His new duchy was formed from one of the less populated lands in the country. However, the colonisation policy which he pursued (including the foundation of cities like Nowa Brzeźnica, Lutomiersk, Wolbórz, and Radomsko) and the close cooperation with the Church slowly changed the image of the district.

In 1267, Casimir died, leaving his domains to his five sons. Leszek, as the oldest son and already in possession of Sieradz, only added Łęczyca. One year later, the citizens of Inowrocław rebelled against the pro-German policy of Ziemomysł and called for Bolesław the Pious to be their new ruler. Ziemomysł, however, managed to keep the government until 1271, when Bolesław finally invaded the duchy, forcing Ziemomysł to escape. Bolesław kept the district for two years, until 1273, when he gave it to Leszek, who was now unexpectedly Duke of Inowrocław. His government over this land lasted until 1278, when, after a meeting at Ląd on 24 August, and thanks to the mediation of Przemysł II of Greater Poland, Leszek returned the duchy to his brother.

== Adoption by Bolesław the Chaste ==
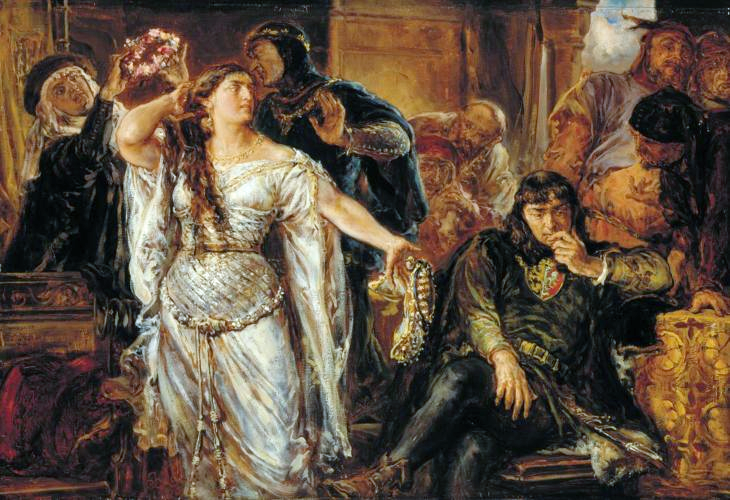
A 19th century depiction of Leszek the Black and his wife Gryfina, by Jan Matejko

After Leszek obtained his political independence in 1261, he rapidly established good relations with Bolesław the Chaste, ruler of Kraków and Sandomierz. The two princes met for the first time in 1260, on the occasion of the expedition against the Kingdom of Bohemia, which was part of a broader action during the Hungarian-Bohemian War for the Babenberg inheritance. Leszek's participation in the war against Bohemia and its allies (Henryk Probus and Władysław Opolski) continued in later years, with particular intensity between 1271 and 1273.

The childlessness of Bolesław and his close cooperation with Leszek resulted in the latter's expectation to become his heir. The document of adoption was issued in 1265; eight years later, Władysław Opolski organized a military expedition to Kraków because he refused to accept the adoption. On 4 June 1273, the Battle of Bogucin Mały took place, in which the Opole-Racibórz army was defeated. At the end of October, Bolesław made a retaliatory expedition against Opole-Racibórz; however, his forces were limited to destroying only specific areas of the duchy. In 1274, Władysław Opolski and Bolesław the Chaste decided to conclude a peace, under which the former gave up his claims to the throne of Kraków in exchange for some territory adjacent to his duchy, stretching as far as the Skawinka river.

In 1265, Leszek married Gryfina (also known as Agrippina), daughter of the Rurikid prince Rostislav Mikhailovich, Ban of Slavonia and Duke of Macsó. The union was quite unhappy; in 1271, a scandal erupted when she fled to Kraków and publicly accused her husband of impotence, adding that for this reason their marriage had never been consummated. The reconciliation of the couple took place four years later, due to the intervention of Bolesław the Chaste and his wife, Kinga, Gryfina returned to her husband on 6 August 1275. Leszek then decided to follow a treatment from the well-known physician Mikołaj of Kraków. His prescription included eating frogs and snakes, because – as was stated in the Rocznik Traski – "the lack of offspring caused a great abomination in the nation". Ultimately, Leszek and Gryfina never had children.

== Duke of Kraków and Sandomierz ==
On 7 December 1279, Bolesław the Chaste died. In accordance with his wishes, the duchies of Kraków and Sandomierz were inherited by Leszek II, who became the new high duke. The succession took place without much difficulty, although it is probable that Leszek was forced to agree to a formal election as Duke of Kraków.

The beginning of his reign was unfortunately not peaceful. Unexpectedly, Leo I of Galicia, with the help of King Wenceslaus II of Bohemia, planned an invasion of Kraków. With the help of Lithuanians, Tartars, and some Russian principalities, Leo invaded Lublin in February 1280, crossed the Vistula, and besieged Sandomierz, which managed to resist. From that point, Leszek was able to unite enough forces to repel the invasion. The final battle took place in Goźlice on 23 February, where the Polish forces (under the command of Peter, voivode of Kraków, and Janusz, voivode of Sandomierz), forced Leo's army to flee. Later that year, Leszek organized a retaliatory expedition, which burned and destroyed the border areas up to Lviv.

The following year, Leszek attacked the Duchy of Wrocław, which belonged to Henry Probus. This was in response to the imprisonment of Leszek's ally, Przemysł II, after a meeting in probably Barycz. This expedition, besides the significant bounty it brought him, did not yield the expected result.

The following years were also not peaceful. In 1282, the Yotvingians invaded Lublin and plundered several villages. Because of this unexpected attack, they were able to advance to Łopiennik Górny. Leszek, after the initial surprise, managed to pursue the invaders and somewhere beyond the Narew river, they clashed in a bloody battle. The Yotvingians were slaughtered, and this defeat effectively destroyed the combat strength of the tribe. One year later, the Lithuanians made a retaliatory expedition, but Leszek was able to defeat them in the Battle of Rowiny.

== Conflict with the Bishop of Kraków ==
Despite all of his military victories, Leszek's position within Kraków-Sandomierz was not that strong. During almost all of his reign, he had to fight internal opposition. The leading opponents to his rule were Paweł of Przemyków, Bishop of Kraków, and Janusz Starża, voivode of Sandomierz. The dispute with Bishop Paweł began in the early 1280s, when Leszek II refused to approve the bishop's broad immunity. The widow of Bolesław, Kinga of Hungary, also had an important role in this conflict. According to her husband's will, she received the district of Stary Sącz as her dower. Because it was on the road to Hungary, this district was strategic and important, and Leszek II considered it to be too valuable to be in her hands. However, another motive may have been that he wanted to give that land to his own wife, Gryfina. During 1282–1283, the conflict came to its most dramatic stage, when Bishop Paweł (who fiercely supported Kinga's rights) was captured after a meeting at Łagów and imprisoned in Sieradz. The Bishop of Kraków only regained his freedom thanks to the consistent intervention of the Polish Church. A final settlement was signed on 30 November 1286 when Leszek agreed to pay Bishop Paweł 3,000 grzywnas as compensation for damages, return his property, and recognize the Bishopric's privileges.

== Knighthood revolts ==
The government of Leszek also garnered opposition from the local knights, which would be surprising given the numerous times that they served the High Duke in his victorious expeditions. The first revolt took place in 1282, when the voivode Janusz Starża, using the absence of Leszek II, gave the fortresses of Sandomierz and Radom to Konrad II of Czersk. This rebellion was quickly suppressed, if it ever occurred at all (as the first information about it came from Jan Długosz, and strangely, the voivode remained in his post).

A more serious revolt took place three years later, in April 1285, when Otto Toporczyk, voivode of Sandomierz, Janusz Starża, the former voivode and now castellan of Kraków, and Żegota, voivode of Kraków, raised an army against Leszek II, who, having been taken by surprise, was forced to escape to Hungary. Fortunately for Leszek II, the rebels' candidate for the throne, Konrad II of Czersk, failed to take the Wawel Castle, which was defended by the faithful local burghers, led by High Duchess Gryfina. On 3 May 1285, a decisive battle took place in Bogucice, where Leszek II, with the help of the Hungarians, obtained a great victory and forced the rebels to leave the country. After overcoming this opposition, Leszek II modified his local policies so that the government was more stable through the end of his reign.

== Final years ==
In 1287–1288, the third invasion of the Mongols into Lesser Poland, led by Nogai Khan and Talabuga, took place, causing Leszek to travel to Hungary and ask for help. This time, Lesser Poland was better prepared for the Mongol invasion than for the previous two incursions, with several more fortresses in Kraków and Sandomierz to defend the lands.

It is believed that Leszek II initiated a process for the unification of Poland. According to the theory of historian Oswald Balzer, Leszek II called the First Piast Coalition, formed by four princes: Henry Probus, Przemysł II, Henry III, Duke of Głogów and himself, on or about 1287, whose main purpose was to arrange the order of succession in Lesser Poland. This hypothesis is refuted by modern historiography because of the known bad relations between Leszek II, Przemysł II, and Henryk Probus during this period. On the other hand, the apparent national unification could have been a result of the growing cult to Saint Stanislaus of Szczepanów.

Leszek died on 30 September 1288 at Kraków and was buried in the local Dominican Church of the Holy Trinity. After his death, a violent dispute erupted among the main Piast rulers for the Seniorate Province. Eventually, Henryk Probus became the new high duke in 1289, but his sudden death one year later caused the Seniorate Province to pass to Przemysł II. However, he was deposed soon thereafter (1291) on behalf of King Wenceslaus II of Bohemia, who claimed Poland. Having no legal grounds to reign, Wenceslaus II managed to obtain a document from his aunt, Dowager Duchess Gryfina, under which she ceded to him the district of Stary Sącz, which she finally received as her dower, with the doubtful inclusion of all of the Seniorate Province.

== See also ==
- Poland during the Piast dynasty
- Nicholas of Poland

Leszek II the Black Piast dynasty Born: c. 1241 Died: 30 September 1288
Preceded by Bolesław the Chaste	High Duke of Poland; Duke of Kraków; 1279 – 1288	Succeeded by Henry Probus
Preceded by Bolesław the Chaste	Duke of Sandomierz; 1279 – 1288	Succeeded by Bolesław II
Preceded by Casimir I	Duke of Sieradz; 1261 – 1288	Succeeded by Władysław the Elbow-high
Preceded by Casimir I	Duke of Łęczyca; 1267 – 1288	Succeeded by Casimir II
Preceded by Bolesław the Pious	Duke of Inowrocław; 1273 – 1278	Succeeded by Ziemomysł
