= Sal Hahót =

13th Century Hungarian clergyman

- Provost of Dömös
- Installed: c. 1259
- Term ended: c. 1295
- Predecessor: Philip
- Successor: G.
- Previous post: lector at the Bács Cathedral

Personal details
- Died: 1295/97
- Denomination: Catholic
- Parents: Buzád III Hahót; Eve Atyusz

Sal from the kindred Hahót (Hungarian: Hahót nembeli Sal; died between 1295 and 1297) was a Hungarian clergyman in the 13th century, who served as Provost of Dömös Chapter from around 1259 to his death.

== Biography ==
Sal (also Sol or Saul) was born into the Buzád branch of the gens Hahót as the son of Buzád III Hahót (died before 1239) and Eve Atyusz. His grandfathers were Buzád II Hahót, a notable baron and later Dominican martyr of the Christian Church, and Sal Atyusz, who held the position of ispán of Karakó ispánate in 1205. Sal was named after the latter, his maternal grandfather. Sal had three siblings: Thomas, a prelate, Atyusz, who governed several counties since the 1270s and was head of the household of Queen Mother Tomasina Morosini for a time, and an unidentified sister, who married local nobleman Ant Lőrinte from Zala County.

Along with Thomas, he entered ecclesiastical service. When his elder brother was elected Archbishop of Kalocsa in 1254, Sal functioned as lector at the Bács Cathedral (today in Bač, Serbia) from 1255 to 1256, which was the second seat of the archbishopric during his term. However Thomas soon died in late 1256.

Thereafter, Sal was elected Provost of Dömös sometime around 1259, replacing Philip. He is first mentioned in this capacity in that undated document, which narrates that the deceased Thomas Hahót remained indebted with 15 silver marks to Denis Péc. His mother Eve Atyusz and his brothers Sal and Atyusz settled the debt before the court of Palatine Roland Rátót. A charter from 1262 refers to a provost of Dömös with initial "D.", who also served as count (head) of the royal chapel in the court of younger king Stephen. According to historian Attila Zsoldos the document in non-authentic, as Sal plausibly held the provostry of Dömös without interruption for decades. Around the same time, both Sal and Atyusz were involved in a lawsuit regarding some ancient lands of their kindred in Sopron County. They became the owners of Egregy (today a borough of Hévíz) in 1274.

Sal was styled as magister by two charters in 1277, when he pledged the estate of Kulcsárkarcsa in Pozsony County (present-day a borough of Kráľovičove Kračany) to the sons of Nicholas Edelényi. Sal and his chapter were granted Szob and the surrounding areas by comes Vid, the brother of Peter, Bishop of Nyitra in 1280. During Sal's tenure as provost, the Dömös Chapter was embroiled in conflict with the Diocese of Veszprém over the collection right of tithe in the three villages of Marót since 1291. In the lawsuit, the interests of Sal and the chapter were represented by Haab, Bishop of Vác. Their superior Archbishop Lodomer ordered the litigants to present before his curia in Buda in August 1295. Although Sal arrived to the capital, but his opponent Benedict Rád, Bishop of Veszprém omitted the meeting, only his lawyer Gregory Bicskei appeared. Therefore, Lodomer postponed the trial for the duration of the later provincial council. The lawsuit continued at least until 1302–1303. Sal died sometime between 1295 and 1297. In the latter year, an unidentified provost with the initial "G." was mentioned regarding the aforementioned trial, implying that Sal Hahót was deceased by then.

== Sources ==
- Hunyadi, Sándor (2021). "Bicskei Gergely választott esztergomi érsek (1298–1303) [Gregory Bicskei elected Archbishop of Esztergom (1298–1303)]". Egyháztörténeti Szemle (in Hungarian). 22 (2): 163–188. ISSN 1585-7476.
- Karácsonyi, János (1901). A magyar nemzetségek a XIV. század közepéig. II. kötet [The Hungarian genera until the middle of the 14th century, Vol. 2] (in Hungarian). Hungarian Academy of Sciences.
- Thoroczkay, Gábor (2012). "A dömösi prépostság története alapításától I. Károly uralkodásának végéig [The History of the Provostry of Dömös from Its Foundation Until the End of the Reign of Charles I]". Fons (in Hungarian). 19 (4). Szentpétery Imre Történettudományi Alapítvány: 409–433. ISSN 1217-8020.
- Udvardy, József (1991). A kalocsai érsekek életrajza (1000–1526) [Biographies of Archbishops of Kalocsa, 1000–1526] (in Hungarian). Görres Gesellschaft.
- Zsoldos, Attila (2011). Magyarország világi archontológiája, 1000–1301 [Secular Archontology of Hungary, 1000–1301] (in Hungarian). História, MTA Történettudományi Intézete. ISBN 978-963-9627-38-3.
