= Nicholas of Dömös =

Hungarian clergyman

Nicholas
- Bishop-elect of Vác
- Installed: 1311 or 1312
- Term ended: 1312
- Predecessor: Haab
- Successor: Benedict (elected or nominated)
- Other post: Provost of Dömös

Personal details
- Died: between 1312 and 1317
- Denomination: Roman Catholic

Nicholas (Hungarian: Miklós; died after 1312) was a Hungarian clergyman in the 14th century, who served as Provost of Dömös Chapter at least from 1310 to 1312. He was irregularly elected as Bishop of Vác in 1311 or 1312, but later the election result was invalidated.

== Career ==
Nicholas is first mentioned as provost of Dömös by his own charter in 1310, during the reign of Charles I of Hungary (his predecessor known only bis his initial "G." last appears in the office in 1297). In the document, Nicholas narrates that John Kőszegi, whose family ruled almost the whole Transdanubia as oligarchs, stormed and plundered the estates of the Dömös Chapter, also ousting him and his clerics from their landholdings. However Stephen Máréi ("Bogár"), the castellan of Dombóvár, who was one of the familiares of the Kőszegi family, assisted to reclaim the usurped and confiscated estates in exchange for amount of money. As a result, Nicholas donated the chapter's uninhabited land of Ravazd to Máréi with the consent of the chapter. The castellan was obliged to pay rent and to pay benefits in kind per household to the provostry for four years.

=== Bishop-elect ===
Haab, Bishop of Vác died in 1311 or 1312. Some members of the cathedral chapter elected Nicholas as his successor, presumably in the first half of 1312. Due to complaints from other canons, the metropolitan Thomas, Archbishop of Esztergom did not confirm the election and submitted the case to the Holy See. Nevertheless, he appointed Nicholas as apostolic administrator of the diocese, probably by exceeding his authority. The conflict is narrated by the letter of Pope Clement V on 1 August 1312. Accordingly, Charles I also protested against Nicholas' election (it is presumable he also had an own candidate or Nicholas had too close a relationship with the Kőszegis and their familiares). Nicholas did not appear before the pope in the Roman Curia, but the representative of the king and the chapter of Vác did (canons John and Bogomer, respectively). Pope Clement instructed Archbishop Thomas to suspend Nicholas from the administration of the bishopric of Vác and to entrust it to a suitable person, while to summon the provost of Dömös before his curia.

Pope Clement regarded that Nicholas' election occurred by violating the canon law, because a significant proportion of the canons were excluded from voting. Clement also considered Nicholas' person unacceptable, because the provost was "inappropriate, ignorant and was even under the process of excommunication". The later stages of the dispute are unknown. A certain Benedict appears as bishop in a papal document in July 1317, but contemporary royal charters consider the see as vacant in the period, and Benedict probably never actually took the position. Pope John XXII invalidated Nicholas' election and appointed Lawrence as Bishop of Vác on 10 April 1318. It is plausible that Nicholas died by then, or was deprived from governing the chapter, as a certain Panyit is referred to as provost of Dömös in 1317.

== Sources ==
- Engel, Pál (1996). Magyarország világi archontológiája, 1301–1457, I. [Secular Archontology of Hungary, 1301–1457, Volume I] (in Hungarian). História, MTA Történettudományi Intézete. ISBN 963-8312-44-0.
- Galla, Ferenc (1970). "A váci egyházmegye püspökei [The Bishops of the Diocese of Vác]". In Bánk, József (ed.). Váci egyházmegyei almanach Szent István millénium évében (in Hungarian). Roman Catholic Diocese of Vác. pp. 103–201.
- Maléth, Ágnes (2020). A Magyar Királyság és a Szentszék kapcsolata I. Károly korában (1301–1342) [The Relationship of the Hungarian Kingdom and the Holy See in the time of Charles I (1301–1342)] (in Hungarian). Pécsi Tudományegyetem BTK TTI Középkori és Koraújkori Történeti Tanszék. ISBN 978-963-429-500-6.
- Thoroczkay, Gábor (2012). "A dömösi prépostság története alapításától I. Károly uralkodásának végéig [The History of the Provostry of Dömös from Its Foundation Until the End of the Reign of Charles I]". Fons (in Hungarian). 19 (4). Szentpétery Imre Történettudományi Alapítvány: 409–433. ISSN 1217-8020.

Catholic Church titles
Preceded by Haab	Bishop of Vác (elected); 1312	Succeeded by Benedict (?) (elected)
