= Haab (bishop of Vác) =

Hungarian prelate

- Bishop of Vác
- Installed: 1294
- Term ended: 1311
- Predecessor: Ladislaus
- Successor: Nicholas (elected)
- Other posts: Provost of Eger; Provost of Pressburg

Personal details
- Died: 1311 or 1312
- Denomination: Roman Catholic

Haab (Hungarian: Háb; died in 1311 or 1312) was a Hungarian prelate at the turn of the 13th and 14th centuries, who served as Bishop of Vác from 1294 until his death.

== Theories of origin ==
The origin of Haab (also Hab or Abba) is uncertain. Matthew II Csák referred to him as his "relative" (cognatus) in his charter issued in February 1276. Since the 18th century, several historians – including Jesuit scholar Károly Wagner – considered that Haab was the brother of Amadeus Aba. Based on the sole aforementioned biographical element regarding his ancestry, Nándor Knauz (1882) argued that Haab belonged to the gens (clan) Csák. In his 1917 monograph on the diocese of Vác, Ferenc Chobot refused this and claimed that Haab belonged to the Galgóc (or Széplak) branch of the gens (clan) Aba. He also argued that the name of Haab (or Abba) is in fact a family name (Aba) and identified his person with a certain Lucas, who served as provost of Esztergom, then Szepes, and chancellor in the court of Dowager Queen Elizabeth the Cuman from 1280 to 1282. Ferenc Galla argued the existence of this "Lucas Aba" is hypothetical, while Ágnes Maléth accepted the theory.

Historian Gergely Kiss rejected Chobot's theory, pointing out its weaknesses in chronology, which, however, is based on a non-authentic charter and misinterpretation of another document, both were issued in 1280. Kiss also emphasized that there is no example in contemporary sources that a person is referred to by his genus name, as Chobot claimed. It is not possible to trace Haab's origins from contemporary sources, since his family relationship with Matthew II Csák may have been very distant according to Gergely Kiss.

== Early career ==
Haab is first mentioned by contemporary records in the aforementioned charter issued in February 1276, when Matthew II Csák, who functioned as Master of the treasury then, exempted Timothy, Bishop of Zagreb and his chapter from paying the tax pondus (seven denars). Haab appears in the document as trustee of the diocese. It is possible that Haab was a member (canon) of that cathedral chapter of Zagreb at that time, although the source does not mention this and there is no data on his possible subsequent operation here.

Sometime in 1279 or 1280, Haab was elected as provost of Eger. He first appears in this dignity in the two aforementioned documents from 1280, when he acted as a testimony in the land division contract between David Aba and his sons (Peter, Finta and Amadeus). According to another document, Lodomer, the Archbishop of Esztergom sent Haab to investigate the possibility of the establishment of parishes in the Szepesség (Spiš) region in the same year. The charter incorrectly refers to Haab as provost of Esztergom, as a result of which the document is considered non-authentic by the Hungarian historiography, but the diploma itself survived only in the 19th-century collection of texts by György Fejér, who may have made a copy error. Haab functioned as provost of Eger at least until 1285.

Haab was elected provost of Pressburg (today Bratislava, Slovakia) in 1291. In this capacity, he requested King Andrew III of Hungary to confirm the former donation letters of King Ladislaus IV, in which the collegiate chapter was granted the lands Sámod, Welk (today Kvetoslavov, Slovakia), Kürt, Szelincs (today Zeleneč, Slovakia) and Ligetfalu (today Petržalka, a borough of Bratislava) in addition to some fishponds. As a testamentary donation, Haab acquired Torony (present-day Tureň, Slovakia) for the chapter of Pressburg in February 1292.

== Bishop of Vác ==
Sometime after July 1293, when his predecessor Ladislaus is last mentioned, Haab was elected as Bishop of Vác. He first appears in the dignity on 29 July 1294, when judged over the lawsuit between the town Esztergom and the provostry of Szenttamás along with other suffragans. Throughout his episcopal governance, Haab has in many cases participated as an ecclesiastical judge in various affairs of the church, which fact demonstrates his skill and proficiency in canon law. During the lawsuit between the Diocese of Veszprém and the Dömös Chapter over the tithe of the three villages of Marót in 1295, Haab was entrusted by Archbishop Lodomer to perform the legal representation of provost Sal Hahót. For a brief time, he was also involved in the litigation between the Diocese of Veszprém and the convent of the Order of Hospitaller Canons Regular of St Stephen in Esztergom sometime between 1296 and 1298, alongside Herman, the abbot of Pannonhalma. At a later stage in the lawsuit, Haab commissioned Stephen, the abbot of Pilis to represent him during the process. Haab participated in the consecration of the Franciscan church in Pressburg, dedicated to Virgin Mary, in March 1297.

Haab, along with the other prelates of the realm, was a supporter of King Andrew III and his efforts to restore strong royal power in Hungary against the emerging oligarchic domains. Haab was a member of that diplomatic mission, which traveled to Vienna in February 1298 in order to engage Andrew's daughter Elizabeth with Wenceslaus, the son of King Wenceslaus II of Bohemia. He was present at the 1298 national diet, where the suffragans under the leadership of John Hont-Pázmány, Archbishop of Kalocsa, initiated and drafted those decrees, which proved to be a watershed in the constitutional system of Hungary and the formation of the parliamentary system. He also participated in the national diet at Pest in the summer of 1299. He was present in the royal council in October 1299, when the monarch returned those castles to the sons of Casimir Hont-Pázmány, which were seized and usurped by Matthew III Csák prior to that during his rebellion. He appears in a similar role in August 1300, when Andrew III donated Cserény (today Čerín, Slovakia) to Paul Kürtösi, ancestor of the Madách family.

Following the death of Andrew III and the extinction of the ruling Árpád dynasty in 1301, Haab supported the claim of the young Wenceslaus to the Hungarian throne, along with overwhelming majority of the prelates led by John Hont-Pázmány. He and other suffragans granted indulgence to the Poor Clares' monastery in Nagyszombat (today Trnava, Slovakia) in July 1301, on their journey to Bohemia in order to invite prince Wenceslaus to become King of Hungary. Haab was present in the coronation of Wenceslaus in August 1301 in Székesfehérvár. After Pope Boniface VIII sent his legate Niccolò Boccasini to Hungary in the autumn of 1301, the political situation has changed. In October 1301, the papal legate summoned and convinced the majority of the Hungarian prelates – including Haab – to accept and support the claim of Charles of Anjou, Wenceslaus' rival during the era of interregnum. Haab acknowledged the supremacy and plenitudo potestatis of the pope. When a group of clergymen visited the Roman Curia in Anagni to negotiate with the pope, his diocese was represented by provost Dominic in the spring of 1303. Pope Boniface, who regarded Hungary as a fief of the Holy See declared Charles the lawful king of Hungary on 31 May 1303. Haab participated in the national synod held in November 1303, which protested against the unlawfully confiscated and usurped tithe revenues from the church. Haab first appears on the list of dignities in a royal charter of Charles I in September 1307. Haab attended the national diet in November 1308, summoned by papal legate Gentile Portino da Montefiore, which unanimously proclaimed Charles as king of Hungary. He participated in the second coronation of Charles I in June 1309. Shortly after the ceremony, the rebellious Matthew Csák plundered many estates of the Diocese of Vác, in the area between Vác and the river Tisza.

Haab actively assisted the judicial activity of papal legate Gentile, who arrived to Hungary in the summer of 1308. He was involved in resolving the dispute over the controversial election of Bishop Peter I of Pécs. Haab, along with John III, Bishop of Nyitra, interrogated 14 canons in September 1308, which resulted Peter's confirmation and the excommunication of his rival, cantor Nicholas (the confidant of local oligarch Henry Kőszegi). Haab testified in the summer of 1309 that the powerful oligarch Ladislaus Kán continuously obstructed the work of the legate's staff and the cathedral chapter of Transylvania regarding the investigation of his influence over the church affairs in the province. Along with several other bishops, Haab requested Pope Clement V in June 1309 to intervene Charles in order to return Medvedgrad to the Diocese of Zagreb from royal property. A certain Lucas was appointed a canon of Vác by Gentile in May 1309. However, Haab and his chapter protested against the decision because Lucas concealed his physical disability (both of his thumbs were missing). Filip de Sardinea, an auditor of the legate investigated the issue and deprived the canon from his office. Haab is last mentioned by contemporary records in 1310 and 1311, in a document of the Vác Chapter and a royal charter, respectively. He last appears as a living person in July 1311. His death is confirmed by Pope Clement on 1 August 1312. Accordingly, the chapter irregularly elected the "inappropriate, ignorant and even excommunicated" Nicholas, the provost of Dömös as his successor, but this decision was not accepted by King Charles I and part of the chapter, so the matter was brought before the Holy See.

== Sources ==
- Engel, Pál (1996). Magyarország világi archontológiája, 1301–1457, I. [Secular Archontology of Hungary, 1301–1457, Volume I] (in Hungarian). História, MTA Történettudományi Intézete. ISBN 963-8312-44-0.
- Galla, Ferenc (1970). "A váci egyházmegye püspökei [The Bishops of the Diocese of Vác]". In Bánk, József (ed.). Váci egyházmegyei almanach Szent István millénium évében (in Hungarian). Roman Catholic Diocese of Vác. pp. 103–201.
- Kiss, Gergely (2021). "Egy ismeretlen ismerős a 13–14. század fordulójáról: Haab [A Familiar Stranger from the Turn of the 13th‒14th Centuries: Haab]". Pontes (in Hungarian). 4. PTE BTK Történettudományi Intézet: 110–130. ISSN 2631-0015.
- Maléth, Ágnes (2020). A Magyar Királyság és a Szentszék kapcsolata I. Károly korában (1301–1342) [The Relationship of the Hungarian Kingdom and the Holy See in the time of Charles I (1301–1342)] (in Hungarian). Pécsi Tudományegyetem BTK TTI Középkori és Koraújkori Történeti Tanszék. ISBN 978-963-429-500-6.
- Zsoldos, Attila (2011). Magyarország világi archontológiája, 1000–1301 [Secular Archontology of Hungary, 1000–1301] (in Hungarian). História, MTA Történettudományi Intézete. ISBN 978-963-9627-38-3.

Catholic Church titles
Preceded by Bartholomew	Provost of Eger; 1280–1285	Succeeded by Stephen
Preceded by Dominic	Provost of Pressburg; 1291–1292	Succeeded by Seraphin Zselizi
Preceded by Ladislaus	Bishop of Vác; 1294–1311	Succeeded by Nicholas (elected)
