= Diocese of Vác =

Roman Catholic diocese in Hungary

Coordinates: 47.7759°N 19.1309°E

Diocese of Vác Dioecesis Vaciensis Váci Egyházmegye

Catholic
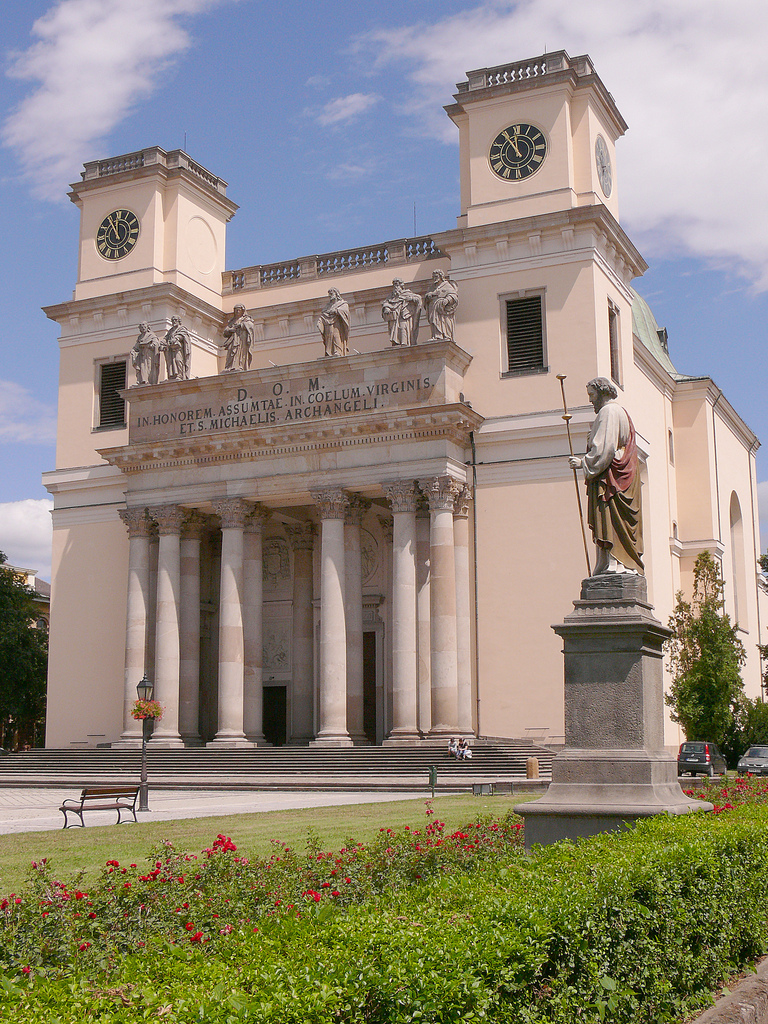
- The Cathedral of the Assumption and St Michael

Location
- Country: Hungary
- Ecclesiastical province: Eger
- Metropolitan: Archdiocese of Eger

Statistics
- Area: 8,800 km^{2} (3,400 sq mi)
- Population: Total; Catholics: (as of 2014); 1,116,000; 640,000 (57.3%)
- Parishes: 220

Information
- Denomination: Catholic Church
- Sui iuris church: Latin Church
- Rite: Roman Rite
- Established: 11th century
- Cathedral: Cathedral of the Assumption and St Michael in Vác
- Patron saint: St Michael; St Stephen I

Current leadership
- Pope: Leo XIV
- Bishop: Zsolt Marton
- Metropolitan Archbishop: Csaba Ternyák
- Auxiliary Bishops: Lajos Varga
- Bishops emeritus: Miklós Beer

Map
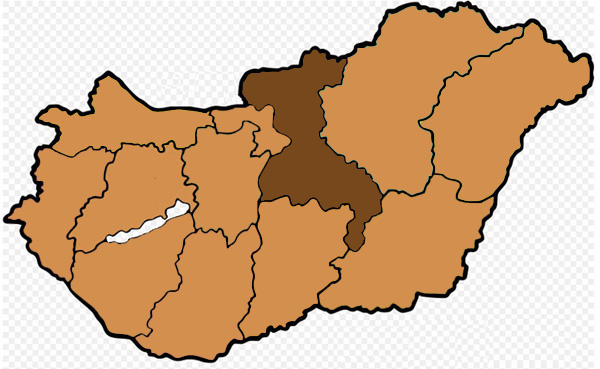
- Map of the Diocese

Website
- Website of the Diocese

The Diocese of Vác (Latin: Dioecesis Vaciensis) is a Latin Church ecclesiastical territory or diocese of the Catholic church in Hungary, with its seat in Vác. The diocese was created in 1008 by St. Stephen, the first King of Hungary. Originally known as the "Diocese of Waitzen" in German, it is a suffragan diocese in the ecclesiastical province of the Archdiocese of Eger. The current bishop is Zsolt Marton, who was appointed in 2019.

== History ==
Its first bishops were Clement, Lazarus, and Aaron. Lazarus is believed to have been bishop from 1075 to 1077; Stephen was known to have been bishop in 1102. Beginning with Marcellus (1105–19), the series of bishops is uninterrupted. Particularly notable early bishops of Vác include: John de Surdis (1363–73), ambassador of King Louis I to Italy in 1369, later on Archbishop of Esztergom; Vincent Szilassy (1450–73), a member of the embassy which brought the newly elected King Matthias Corvinus from Prague to Vác; Wladislaw Szalkai (1514–23), chancellor of King Louis II and afterwards Archbishop of Esztergom; Martinus Pethe (1582–86), transferred to Kalocsa.

Later important bishops include Sigismund Kolonits (1709–16), transferred to Vienna, and first Archbishop of Vienna; Count Michael Friedrich von Althann (1718–34), sent as viceroy to Sicily by Emperor Charles VI, and afterwards cardinal; Count Christopher Migazzi, cardinal and Archbishop of Vienna, twice Bishop of Vác (1756–57); 1762–82); Augustinus Roskoványi (1851–59), an eminent theological writer, transferred to Nyitra in 1859. Roskoványi was succeeded by Anthony Peitler, 1859–85, who founded the library at Vác. In 1900 Count Charles Csáky became bishop.

In 1514, when the Ottoman Turks conquered Vác, the cathedral chapter ceased to exist, but was re-established in 1700.

In the early 20th century, the diocese included parts of the counties of Nógrád, Pest, Csongrád and Jász-Nagykun-Szolnok, divided into three archdeaconries and nineteen vice-archdeaconries. Within the diocese were five titular abbeys, four provostships and six titular provostships. The chapter had twelve canons and six titular canons. The number of parishes was 123; that of the clergy, 266. The right of patronage was exercised by 44 patrons. The diocese included 7 monasteries and 12 nunneries, with altogether 232 inmates. The Catholic population was 757 827.

In 1993 the diocese ceded the territory of Pest to the Archdiocese of Esztergom (that became Esztergom-Budapest), until then Vác was a suffragan see of Esztergom but became suffragan of the Archdiocese of Eger.

== Bishops ==
=== Ordinaries ===
- Marcellus (1111–1113)
- Marcellinus (1138–1139)
- Hippolytus (1156–1157)
- Ded (c. 1158–1162)
- Job (1181–1183)
- Boleslaus (1193–1212)
- James (1213–1221)
- Briccius (1221–1236)
- Matthias Rátót (1238–1240)
- Stephen Báncsa (1240–1243)
- Heimo (1244–1254)
- Matthias (1259)
- Philip (1262–1277)
- Thomas (1278–1289)
- Theodore Tengerdi (1289, elected)
- Ladislaus (1289–1293)
- Haab (1294–1311)
- Nicholas (1312, elected)
- Michael Szécsényi (1342–1362)
- John de Surdis (1363–1375)
- István Szuhay † (1595 ordained Bishop – 1600 appointed Bishop of Eger)
- Mátyás Tarnóczy † (1651 appointed – 7 Aug 1655 died)
- János Gubasóczy † (1676 appointed – 1679 appointed Bishop of Nitra)
- Sigismund Graf Kollonitsch † (14 October 1709 appointed – 1 July 1716 appointed Bishop of Wien)
- Wilhelm Graf von Leslie † (6 April 1716 appointed – 5 January 1718 appointed Bishop of Ljubljana)
- Christoph Bartholomäus Anton Graf Migazzi † (28 August 1756 appointed – 15 March 1757 appointed Archbishop of Wien {Vienna})
- Karl Ambrose Ferdinand von Habsburg † (17 November 1806 appointed – 16 March 1808 appointed Archbishop of Esztergom)
- László Kámánházy † (11 July 1808 appointed – 4 February 1817 died)
- Agostino Roskovanyi † (5 September 1851 appointed – 15 April 1859 appointed Bishop of Nitra)
- Antonio Giuseppe Peitler † (15 April 1859 appointed – )
- Konštantín Schuster † (1886 appointed – 23 July 1899 died)
- Károly Emmánuel de Csáky † (19 April 1900 appointed – 16 February 1919 died)
- Árpád István Hanauer † (9 September 1919 appointed – 1942 died)
- Jozsef Pétery † (24 September 1942 appointed – 15 November 1967 died)
- József Bánk † (10 January 1969 appointed – 2 February 1974 appointed Archbishop of Eger)
- Mihály Endrey-Eipel † (7 Jan 1975 appointed – 4 July 1977 died)
- József Bánk † (2 March 1978 appointed – 3 March 1987 retired)
- Izidor István Marosi † (3 March 1987 appointed – 11 February 1992 retired)
- Ferenc Keszthelyi †, O. Cist. (11 February 1992 appointed – 27 March 2003 retired)
- Miklós Beer (27 May 2003 appointed – 12 July 2019)
- Zsolt Marton (12 July 2019 -)

=== Another priest of this diocese who became bishop ===
- Gábor Pintér, appointed nuncio and titular archbishop in 2016

== Sources ==
- Diocese of Vác; catholic-hierarchy.org
