= Marcellinus (bishop of Vác) =

Hungarian prelate

- Bishop of Vác
- Installed: 1138 or before
- Term ended: 1139 or after
- Predecessor: Marcellus (?)
- Successor: Hippolytus (?)

Personal details
- Died: after 1139
- Denomination: Catholic

Marcellinus or Maredinus was a Hungarian prelate in the first half of the 12th century, who served as Bishop of Vác from around 1138 to 1139, during the reign of Béla II of Hungary.

== Career ==
Marcellinus became bishop sometime after 1113, when his last known predecessor Marcellus is mentioned. His name appears among the testimonies in that document, in which King Béla II listed the estates and privileges of the Dömös Chapter in 1138. Marcellinus is last mentioned as bishop in 1139. His next known successor, Hippolytus first appears in the dignity only in 1156.

== Sources ==
- Galla, Ferenc (1970). "A váci egyházmegye püspökei [The Bishops of the Diocese of Vác]". In Bánk, József (ed.). Váci egyházmegyei almanach Szent István millénium évében (in Hungarian). Roman Catholic Diocese of Vác. pp. 103–201.
- Zsoldos, Attila (2011). Magyarország világi archontológiája, 1000–1301 [Secular Archontology of Hungary, 1000–1301] (in Hungarian). História, MTA Történettudományi Intézete. ISBN 978-963-9627-38-3.

Catholic Church titles
Preceded by Marcellus (?)	Bishop of Vác; 1138–1139	Succeeded by Hippolytus (?)
