= Bratislava-Vrakuňa railway station =

Railway station in Vrakuňa, Slovakia

Bratislava-Vrakuňa (Hungarian: Pozsony-Vereknye; German: Preßburg-Fragendorf)
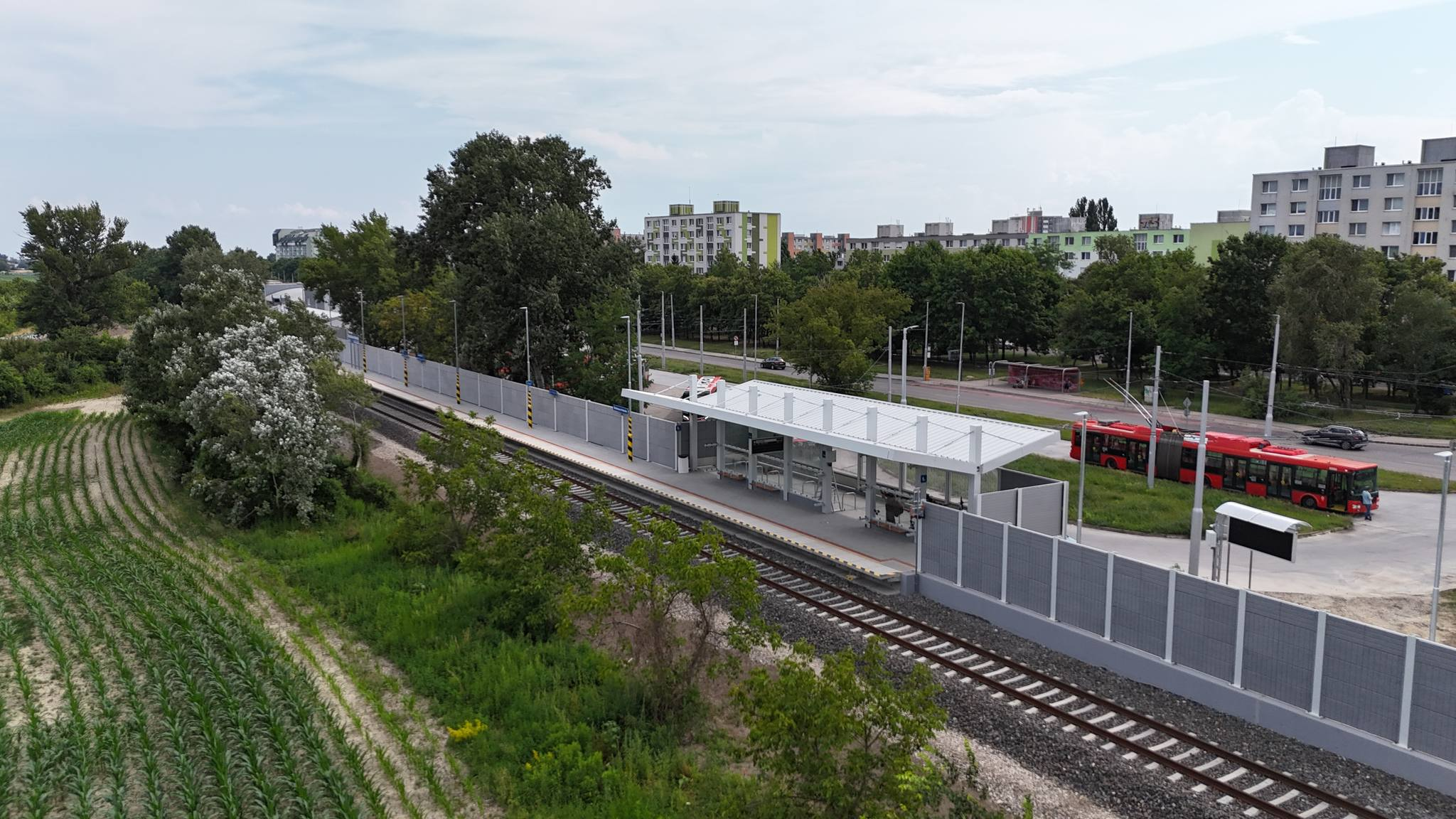
- The new TIOP Bratislava-Vrakuňa on the day of its opening (1 July 2024)

General information
- Location: Železničná Street (former station); Dvojkrížna Street (TIOP); Bratislava II; Bratislava Region; Vrakuňa; Slovakia
- Coordinates: 48.1442392°N 17.2134155°E
- System: railway station
- Owner: Železnice Slovenskej republiky
- Operator: Železnice Slovenskej republiky
- Line: S70 Bratislava main railway station – (Kvetoslavov) – Dunajská Streda – Komárno
- Distance: 147m (482ft)
- Platforms: 1
- Tracks: 1
- Train operators: Leo Express (previously RegioJet)
- Connections: Buses: 67, 79; Regional buses: 720, 730, 740; S trains: S70

Construction
- Structure type: open
- Parking: Yes
- Cycle facilities: No

Other information
- Fare zone: 101
- Website: www.zstbratislavavrakuna.sk

History
- Opened: 1895; 15 October 2016 (reopened); 1 July 2024 (reopened as TIOP)
- Closed: 1974; 1 June 2024 (station at Železničná Street)

Passengers
- 65000/year: 250/day
- Rank: 500/platform

Services
ticket machine, timetable board, dustbins
Location
- Location within Slovakia

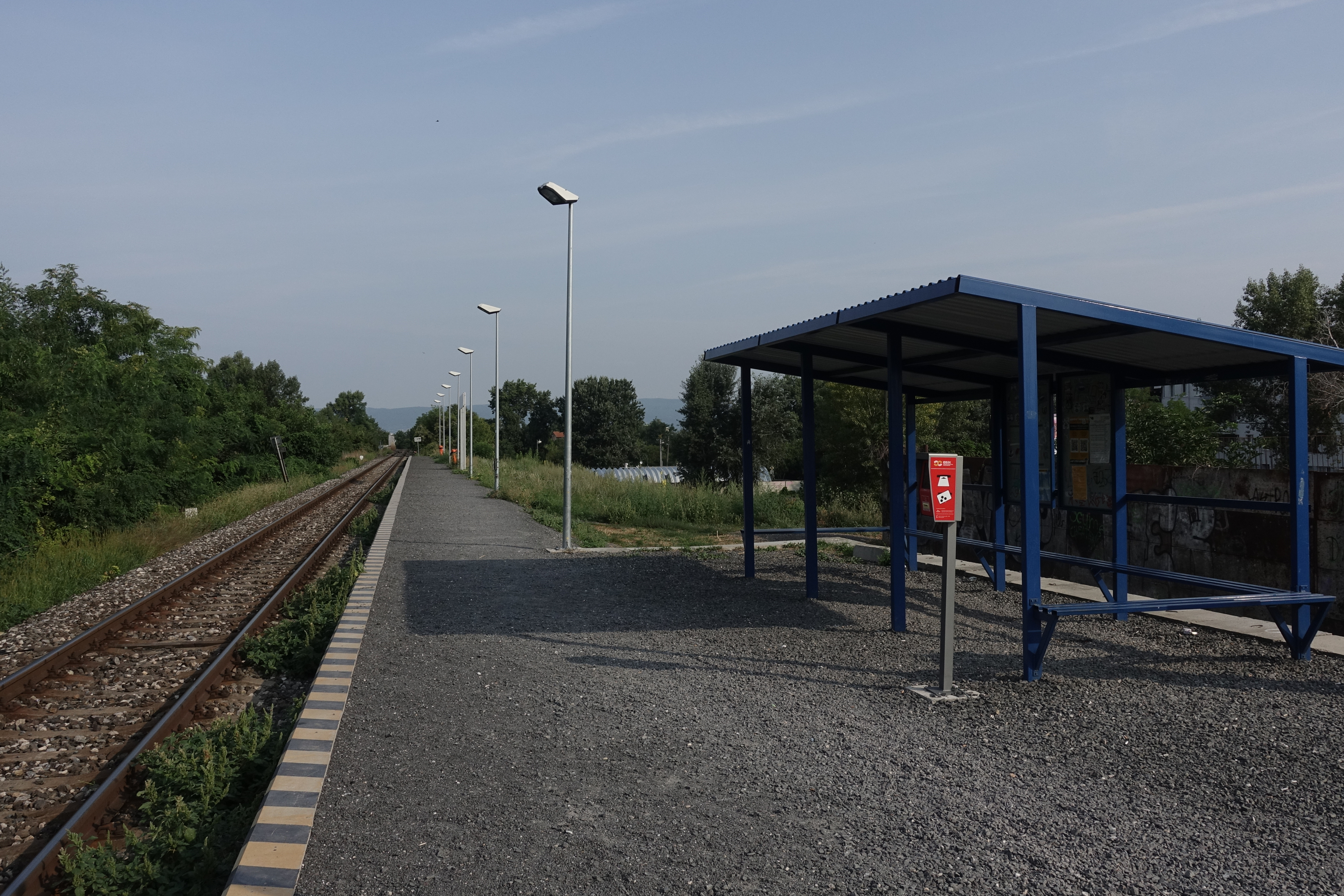
The original temporary stop Bratislava-Vrakuňa, which operated until 1 June 2024

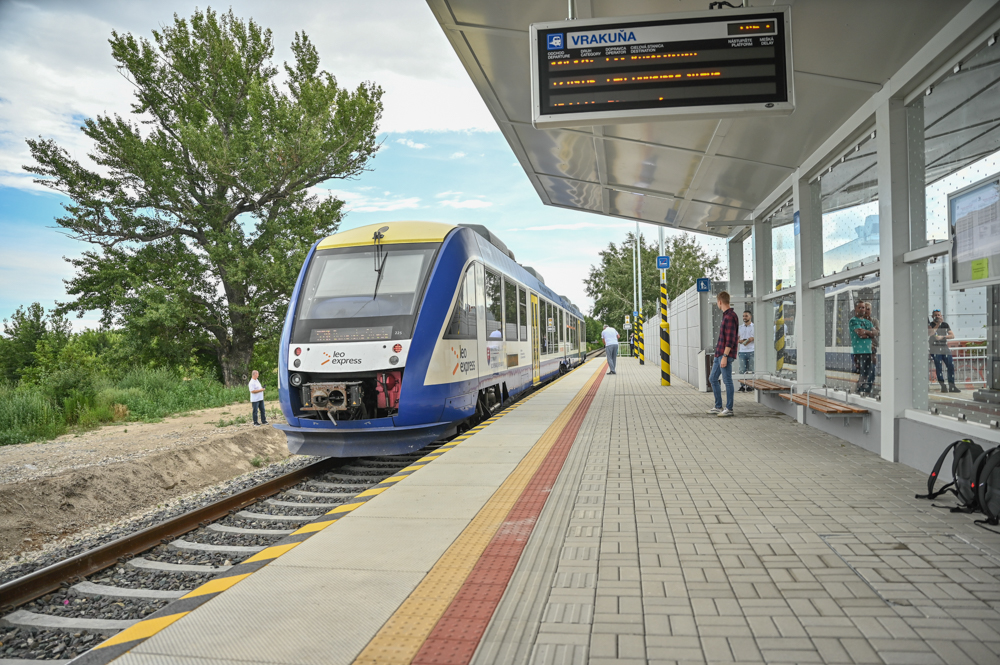
A view of the new TIOP Vrakuňa platform on the day of its opening (1 July 2024)

Bratislava-Vrakuňa railway station is a railway station on railway line 131 in Bratislava-Vrakuňa, Slovakia. The station was opened in 1895 but closed in 1974. It was reopened on 15 October 2016 and rebuilt to the integrated passenger transport terminal (TIOP) from October 2023 to June 2024.

This train station connects four train stations: Bratislava main railway station, Kvetoslavov, Dunajská Streda and Komárno.

== Services ==
Preceding station	RegioJet	Following station
Bratislava-Nové Mesto toward Bratislava main railway station	RegioJet	Podunajské Biskupice toward Komárno

== Public transport ==
Until 1 June 2024 the public transport was from Railway street (Slovak: Železničná) bus stop:

- 67 Astronomic street (Slovak: Astronomická) – Vineyard street (Slovak: Vinohradnícka)
- 79 Čiližská street (Slovak: Čiližská) – Hazel/Poplar (Slovak: Lieskovec/Topoľové)

Since 1 July 2024 the public transport was from Čiližská street (Slovak: Čiližská) bus stop:

- 65 Jurajov dvor – Tbiliská street (Slovak: Tbiliská)
- 67 Vineyard street (Slovak: Vinohradnícka) – Sheep street (Slovak: Ovčiarska)
- 67 Astronomic street (Slovak: Astronomická)
- 75 Kadnárova street (Slovak: Kadnárova)

Intercity transport is from Píniová street (Slovak: Píniová) bus stop:

- 720 The central bus station (Slovak: Autobusová stanica) – Wolfs (Slovak: Vlky)
- 730 The central bus station (Slovak: Autobusová stanica) – Gold spikes, Rastice, Jednota shop (Slovak: Zlaté Klasy, Rastice, Jednota)
- 740 The central bus station (Slovak: Autobusová stanica) – New life, Vojtechovce/Čenkovce, culture house (Slovak: Nový Život, Vojtechovce/Čenkovce, kultúrny dom)
