= Ladislaus (bishop of Vác) =

Hungarian Catholic bishop (d. 1293 or 1294)

- Bishop of Vác
- Installed: 1289
- Term ended: 1293 or 1294
- Predecessor: Theodore Tengerdi (elected)
- Successor: Haab
- Other post: Provost of Vác

Personal details
- Died: 1293 or 1294
- Denomination: Catholic Church

Ladislaus (Hungarian: László; died 1293 or 1294) was a Hungarian prelate in the 13th century, who served as Bishop of Vác from 1289 until his death.

== Career ==
Ladislaus functioned as provost of Vác from 1278 to 1284. In this capacity, he served as chancellor in the court of Queen Isabella of Sicily, the spouse of Ladislaus IV of Hungary, from 1278 to 1280 and in 1284.

Following the unsuccessful confirmation of Theodore Tengerdi, Ladislaus elevated into the position of bishop of Vác in the summer of 1289. He attended the provincial synod held in Esztergom in May 1292. He died sometime between July 1293 and July 1294, when Haab succeeded him.

== Sources ==
- C. Tóth, Norbert (2023). A váci székeskáptalan archontológiája, 1200–1543 [Archontology of the Cathedral Chapter of Vác, 1200–1543] (in Hungarian). Subsidia ad historiam medii aevi Hungariae inquirendam 16., National Archives of Hungary. ISSN 1787-9213.
- Galla, Ferenc (1970). "A váci egyházmegye püspökei [The Bishops of the Diocese of Vác]". In Bánk, József (ed.). Váci egyházmegyei almanach Szent István millénium évében (in Hungarian). Roman Catholic Diocese of Vác. pp. 103–201.
- Zsoldos, Attila (2011). Magyarország világi archontológiája, 1000–1301 [Secular Archontology of Hungary, 1000–1301] (in Hungarian). História, MTA Történettudományi Intézete. ISBN 978-963-9627-38-3.

Catholic Church titles
Preceded by Gregory	Provost of Vác; 1278–1284	Succeeded by Dominic
Preceded by Theodore Tengerdi (elected)	Bishop of Vác; 1289–1293	Succeeded by Haab
Political offices
Preceded by Peter Kőszegi	Chancellor of the Queen; 1278–1280	Succeeded by Thomas
Preceded by Thomas	Chancellor of the Queen; 1284	Succeeded by Peter Kőszegi
