= Theodore Tengerdi =

Hungarian bishop

- Bishop of Győr
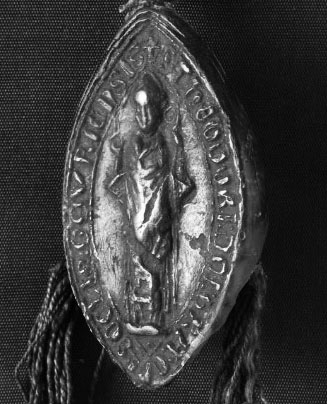
- Seal of Theodore Tengerdi (1303)
- Appointed: 1295
- Term ended: 1308
- Predecessor: Andrew
- Successor: Nicholas Kőszegi
- Other posts: Bishop-elect of Vác; Vice-chancellor

Personal details
- Died: May/October 1308
- Parents: Nicholas I Tengerdi
- Education: University of Bologna

Theodore Tengerdi (Hungarian: Tengerdi Tivadar; died May/October 1308) was a Hungarian prelate at the turn of the 13th and 14th centuries, who served as Bishop of Győr from 1295 to 1308. Prior to that, he was provost of Székesfehérvár and vice-chancellor in the royal court, and briefly elected Bishop of Vác.

== Early career ==
Theodore was born into a prominent Transdanubian family, which originated from Tengerd in Fejér County. His father was vice-judge royal Nicholas I, who bought the village and the surrounding lands in 1256. Theodore had two elder brothers, Nicholas II and Ladislaus I, who actively participated in the royal military campaigns against the Kingdom of Bohemia in the early 1270s. Ladislaus had a daughter Anne, who married James Hahót. The brothers' branch died out by the middle of the 14th century. The Rumi and the Botka de Széplak noble families descended from Theodore's uncles.

As the youngest one, Theodore entered ecclesiastical service. Consequently, he attended the University of Bologna, a university record preserved his name in February 1269, when his debt (18 pounds) was settled by another Hungarian student Paul in his name. He bore the title of "magister", demonstrating his education and skills in science. Theodore was first mentioned by contemporary records in 1274, when Ladislaus IV of Hungary recovered the estate of Sitke and donated Chueföld, which then belonged to Szolgagyőr Castle (present-day ruins in Hlohovec, Slovakia), to the three brothers for the bravery and loyalty of Nicholas and Ladislaus in the previous years. He elevated into the dignity of provost of Szeben (today Sibiu, Romania) by 1284, serving in this office until 1287. Simultaneously, he also acted as a personal notary of King Ladislaus IV. Theodore was also a confidant of the queen mother, Elizabeth the Cuman and the queen consort Elizabeth of Sicily: the two queens jointly donated Dencs and Osztopán, accessories to the Segesd lordship, to Theodore and Ladislaus in June 1284 (their brother Nicholas died by then).

Ladislaus made Theodore as his vice-chancellor in 1286. In the next year, he was also elected provost of Székesfehérvár, thus he held both offices simultaneously, which have traditionally belonged together in the previous decades. By that time, he was already a canon of the collegiate chapter. During his appointment, he was granted Iváncsa by the king's spouse, Queen Elizabeth of Sicily. A single charter from 1289 also styled him as Bishop-elect of Vác, but he was unable to take the office for unknown reasons. Theodore was confirmed as provost by Pope Nicholas IV shortly after February 1289, when he instructed the local Dominican prior and the custos of the local Franciscans to investigate the regularity of his election before confirmation.

== Crown guard and bishop ==
It is possible that Theodore supported Archbishop Lodomer, who entered into an alliance with the rebellious Kőszegi family against the immoral and weak-handed Ladislaus IV and agreed to offer the crown to the king's distant relative Andrew the Venetian, who arrived to Hungary in early 1290. However Andrew was captured and surrendered him to Duke Albert. Ladislaus was assassinated by his favored Cuman subjects on 10 July 1290. Following the assassination, Lodomer managed to free Andrew from his captivity in order to crown king. As provost of Székesfehérvár, Theodore also functioned as guardian of the Holy Crown of Hungary. Upon Andrew's arrival, his unidentified opponents tried to bribe Theodore not to hand over the crown jewels to the soon-to-be-king, but the provost refused them. Archbishop Lodomer crowned Andrew king in Székesfehérvár on 23 July 1290.

Theodore was a staunch supporter of Andrew III throughout his reign. He retained his positions of vice-chancellor and provost of Székesfehérvár too. He was one of the main organizers of the diet, which took place in Óbuda in the first days of September 1290, where Andrew III promised to preserve the rights and privileges of the nobility. As vice-chancellor, Theodore drafted the text of the laws. At his own request, one of the articles stated "the old right of the church of Fehérvár to the position of vice-chancellor to be held", thus officially combined the two dignities, confirming the existing customary law. The Hungarian diplomacy already began a search for a suitable spouse for their new king before his release from captivity and the coronation. After the closure of the diet, Theodore traveled to Kuyavia in the Kingdom of Poland to escort Andrew's fiancée Fenenna, the daughter of Ziemomysł of Kuyavia to Hungary. The wedding took place before the end of 1290. Theodore sent a large army (banderium) to Andrew's military campaign against the Duchy of Austria in the summer of 1291. Thereafter the concluded peace treaty prescribed the destruction of the fortresses that Albert of Austria had seized from the Kőszegis, who, in response, rose up in open rebellion against Andrew in spring 1292, acknowledging Charles Martel of Anjou, as King of Hungary. The royal troops subdued the rebellion by July, but Ivan Kőszegi captured and imprisoned Andrew during his journey to Slavonia in August. Theodore arrived to the province with his army. He saved the royal property, jewels, and treasures from the robbers, and transferred them to the royal court. Alongside other lords and bishops, Theodore negotiated with the notorious Ivan Kőszegi over the liberation of Andrew. He was among those partisans, who sent their relatives – his brother Ladislaus and nephews – as hostages to the Kőszegis, thus Andrew was freed. As a result, they were granted Halásztelek by Andrew III in January 1293. Theodore and his relatives bought Békásmegyer for 120 silver denari from Ladislaus Balog, lector of Buda chapter. The family also acquired forts and towers in the nearby Margaret Island.

Theodore Tengerdi was elected Bishop of Győr around April 1295. Therefore he was replaced as provost of Székesfehérvár by Gregory Bicskei still in that month, but, despite the aforementioned law, which legitimized a custom right, he retained the office of vice-chancellor until 1297, when Bicskei succeeded him in those dignity too. On behalf of his king, Theodore was present at the coronation of Wenceslaus II of Bohemia in Prague on 2 June 1297. Among many prelates, he also attended the foundation of the monastery of Königsaal (Zbraslav) after the ceremony. In February 1298, Theodore was present in Vienna when Elizabeth, Andrew's daughter was betrothed to Wenceslaus, the son of the Bohemian king. Theodore attended the diet in Pest in the summer of 1298, which authorized Andrew to destroy forts built without permission and ordered the punishment of those who had seized landed property with force. The Diocese of Győr, which laid in the borderlands between the expansionary Kőszegi and Csák domains, was threatened constantly by looting and plundering raids. Ivan Kőszegi pillaged and unlawfully seized the bishopric's several lands in Western Transdanubia. In response, Theodore excommunicated the treacherous and greedy lord, but without any consequences and results. During his episcopate, Theodore donated privileges to the fishermen and millers of the nearby Révfalu (today a borough of Győr).

== Interregnum ==
Andrew III died in 1301. With his death, the House of Árpád, the first royal dynasty of Hungary, ended. A period of Interregnum and civil war between various claimants to the throne – Charles of Anjou, Wenceslaus of Bohemia, and Otto of Bavaria – followed Andrew's death and lasted for seven years. It is plausible that Theodore initially supported the claim of Wenceslaus, alongside the majority of the Hungarian prelates. However the arriving papal legate Niccolo Boccasini convinced most of the bishops to accept Charles's reign. Upon the invitation of Pope Boniface VIII, Theodore was a member of that Hungarian clerical delegation, which visited the Roman Curia and met the pope and Charles' grandmother Mary, Queen of Naples. Pope Boniface, who regarded Hungary as a fief of the Holy See declared Charles the lawful king of Hungary on 31 May 1303. The Hungarian prelates, led by Stephen, Archbishop of Kalocsa traveled further to the Neapolitan court, while Theodore returned to Hungary. He already resided in Szombathely on 24 June 1303.

To strengthen his son's position, Wenceslaus II of Bohemia came to Hungary at the head of a large army in May 1304. However, his negotiations with the local lords convinced him that his son's position in Hungary had dramatically weakened. Accordingly, he decided to take his son back to Bohemia and even took the Holy Crown of Hungary with himself to Prague. According to the narration of the Steirische Reimchronik ("Styrian Rhyming Chronicle"), perceiving the intrigue, Theodore Tengerdi and his small accompaniment caught up to the royal escort before crossing the border. There, the bishop asked and begged King Wenceslaus not to take the Holy Crown and the royal insignia out of the Kingdom of Hungary, but the Bohemian king replied angrily the crown is not entitled to anyone more than the rightful king who is his son, and the Holy Crown must be kept where the king resides. Theodore and his banderium participated in the invasion of Bohemia in the autumn of 1304. Theodore Tengerdi died sometimes between May and October 1308, when he was succeeded by Ivan Kőszegi's illegitimate son Nicholas, who was Theodore's deputy as provost of the collegiate chapter of St. Adalbert church in Győr prior to that.

== Sources ==
- Bánk, József, ed. (1968). Győregyházmegyei almanach. Schematizmus Dioecesis Jaurinensis [Almanac of the Diocese of Győr] (in Hungarian). Authority of the Diocese of Győr.
- Engel, Pál (1996). Magyarország világi archontológiája, 1301–1457, I. [Secular Archontology of Hungary, 1301–1457, Volume I] (in Hungarian). História, MTA Történettudományi Intézete. ISBN 963-8312-44-0.
- Győri, Éva (2008). "Győri püspökök a XIII. században [The Bishops of Győr in the 13th Century]". Belvedere Meridionale (in Hungarian). 20 (1–2): 24–43. ISSN 1419-0222.
- Haraszti Szabó, Péter; Kelényi, Borbála (2019). Magyarországi diákok francia, angol, itáliai és német egyetemeken a középkorban, 1100–1526 [Students from Hungary at the Universities of France, England, Italy and Germany in the Middle Ages 1100–1526] (in Hungarian). ELTE Egyetemi Könyvtár és Levéltár; MTA ELTE Egyetemtörténeti Kutatócsoport. ISBN 978-963-489-098-0.
- Kádár, Tamás (2015). "Harcban a koronáért. I. Károly (Róbert) király uralkodásának első évei 1305 végéig [Fight for the Crown. The First Regnal Years of Charles I (Robert) until the End of 1305]". Történeti Tanulmányok. Acta Universitatis Debreceniensis (in Hungarian). 23: 42–111. ISSN 1217-4602.
- Kertész, Balázs (2022). A székesfehérvári káptalan archontológiája és oklevéladó tevékenysége az Árpád-korban [The Archontology and Diploma Issuing Activity of the Chapter of Székesfehérvár in the Age of Árpáds] (in Hungarian). Városi Levéltár és Kutatóintézet. ISBN 978-963-8406-27-9.
- Rudolf, Veronika (2023). Közép-Európa a hosszú 13. században [Central Europe in the Long 13th Century] (in Hungarian). Arpadiana XV., Research Centre for the Humanities. ISBN 978-963-416-406-7.
- Szűcs, Jenő (2002). Az utolsó Árpádok [The Last Árpáds] (in Hungarian). Osiris Kiadó. ISBN 963-389-271-6.
- Zsoldos, Attila (2003). "III. András". In Szovák, Kornél; Szentpéteri, József; Szakács, Margit (eds.). Szent István és III. András [Saint Stephen and Andrew III] (in Hungarian). Kossuth Kiadó. pp. 119–227. ISBN 963-09-4461-8.
- Zsoldos, Attila (2011). Magyarország világi archontológiája, 1000–1301 [Secular Archontology of Hungary, 1000–1301] (in Hungarian). História, MTA Történettudományi Intézete. ISBN 978-963-9627-38-3.

Theodore House of Tengerdi Born: ? Died: May/October 1308
Catholic Church titles
Preceded by Benedict (?)	Provost of Szeben; 1284–1287	Succeeded by John
Preceded by Anthony	Provost of Székesfehérvár; 1287–1295	Succeeded by Gregory Bicskei (elected)
Preceded by Thomas	Bishop of Vác (elected); 1289	Succeeded by Ladislaus
Preceded by Andrew	Bishop of Győr; 1295–1308	Succeeded by Nicholas Kőszegi
Political offices
Preceded by Bartholomew	Vice-chancellor; 1286–1297	Succeeded by Gregory Bicskei
