= Heimo (bishop of Vác) =

Hungarian prelate

- Bishop of Vác
- Installed: 1244
- Term ended: 1254/1259
- Predecessor: Stephen Báncsa
- Successor: Matthias

Personal details
- Died: after 1254
- Denomination: Catholic

Heimo, also Heymo or Haymo, was a Hungarian prelate in the mid-13th century, who served as Bishop of Vác from around 1244 to 1254, during the reign of Béla IV of Hungary.

== Career ==
The young cleric Heimo entered the service of Duke Béla, the eldest son and heir of Andrew II of Hungary. He functioned as chancellor of Béla's ducal court in Slavonia in 1222. He was succeeded by Matthias Rátót in this capacity by 1224.

Heimo was elected Bishop of Vác in the second half of 1243 or early 1244, succeeding Stephen Báncsa. In 1244 or 1245, Béla IV entrusted Heimo and local ispán Henry Kőszegi to investigate and supervise previous royal land grants occurred in Vas County. In December 1252, Pope Innocent IV mandated Heimo and Zlaudus Ják to implement the papal command concerning the appointment of Stephen Báncsa as administrator of the Archdiocese of Esztergom. Heimo last appears in contemporary records in 1254, when Béla IV instructed him to assign the uninhabited royal land Kovácsi in Pest County to Egidius Kókai. Heimo was succeeded as bishop of Vác by Matthias in 1259 at the latest.

== Sources ==
- Barabás, Gábor (2023). Delegated Papal Jurisdiction in Arpadian Hungary. Bishops – provosts – papal chaplains. Arpadiana XVI., Research Centre for the Humanities. ISBN 978-963-416-405-0.
- Galla, Ferenc (1970). "A váci egyházmegye püspökei [The Bishops of the Diocese of Vác]". In Bánk, József (ed.). Váci egyházmegyei almanach Szent István millénium évében (in Hungarian). Roman Catholic Diocese of Vác. pp. 103–201.
- Zsoldos, Attila (2011). Magyarország világi archontológiája, 1000–1301 [Secular Archontology of Hungary, 1000–1301] (in Hungarian). História, MTA Történettudományi Intézete. ISBN 978-963-9627-38-3.
- Zsoldos, Attila (2016). "A vasi várispánság felbomlása [Dissolution of the Royal County District of Vas]". In Zsoldos, Attila (ed.). Vitézek, ispánok, oligarchák. Tanulmányok a társadalom- és a hadtörténetírás határvidékéről (in Hungarian). Ministry of Defence Military History Institute and Museum. pp. 119–135. ISBN 978-963-7097-76-8.

Catholic Church titles
Preceded by Stephen Báncsa	Bishop of Vác; 1244–1254	Succeeded by Matthias
