= Miklós Beer =

Hungarian prelate

His Excellency Miklós Beer D.D., Th.D
- Bishop emeritus of Vác
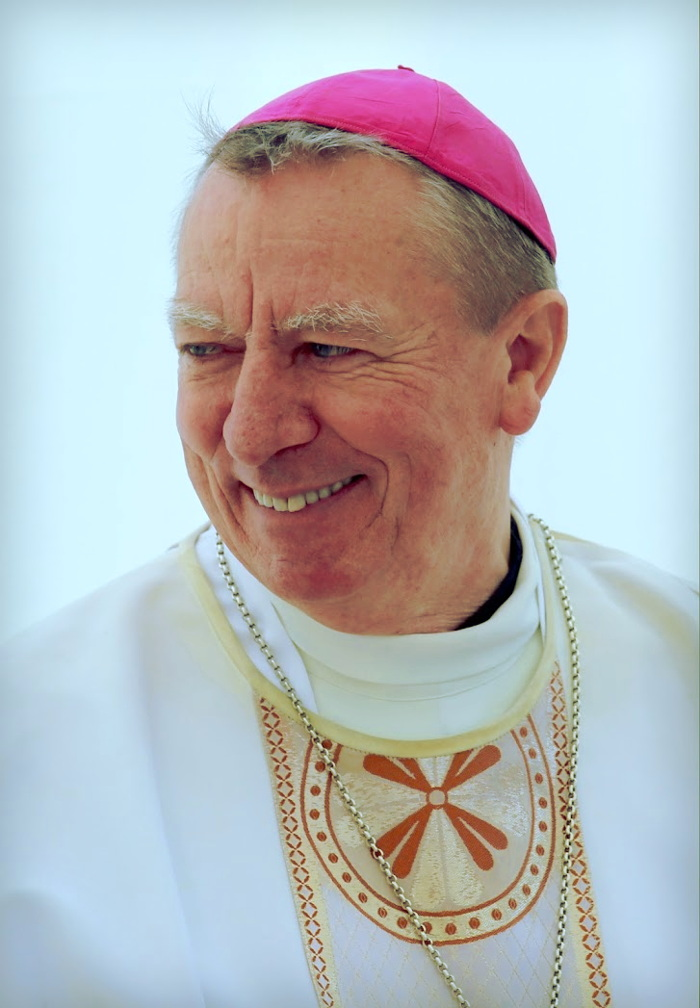
- Miklós Beer in 2014
- Church: Roman Catholic Church
- Archdiocese: Eger
- See: Vác
- Appointed: 27 May 2003
- Installed: 20 June 2003
- Term ended: 12 July 2019
- Predecessor: Ferenc Keszthelyi
- Successor: Zsolt Marton
- Previous post: Auxiliary Bishop of Esztergom-Budapest (2000–03)

Orders
- Ordination: 19 June 1966
- Consecration: 27 May 2000
- Rank: Bishop

Personal details
- Born: Miklós Beer; 1 June 1943 (age 83) Budapest, Hungary
- Denomination: Roman Catholic
- Motto: Latin: Permanentes in fide (Remaining faithful)
- Coat of arms

Styles of Miklós Beer
- Reference style: The Most Reverend
- Spoken style: Your Excellency
- Religious style: Monsignor

Miklós Beer (born 1 June 1943) is a Hungarian prelate of the Catholic Church, who was Bishop of Vác from 2003 to 2019. He previously served as auxiliary bishop of the Archdiocese of Esztergom-Budapest from 2000 to 2003.

== Life ==
Beer grew up in Budapest, where he attended the Central Seminary (Seminarium Centrale; Hungarian: Központi Papnevelő Intézet). He was ordained priest in Esztergom on 19 June 1966. He received the academic degree of Doctor of Theology from the Roman Catholic Central Theological Academy (the institute now is Faculty of Theology of the Pázmány Péter Catholic University). He started his ecclesiastical career as a parochial vicar at Kőbánya, serving in this capacity between 1967 and 1969. Then he was transferred to Szob, where he resided until 1970. He was pastor of the Basilica of Our Lady of Hungary in Márianosztra from 1970 to 1975, then of St. Lawrence Parish in Pilismarót from 1976 to 1997. Beside that he also taught theology at the Theological College of Esztergom. In 1999, he was named rector of the seminary, holding the position until 2003.

He was named Auxiliary Bishop of Esztergom-Budapest on 8 April 2000. He was consecrated a bishop by Pope John Paul II on 27 May.

After the retirement of Ferenc Keszthelyi, Pope John Paul II appointed him Bishop of Vác on 27 May 2003, where he was installed on 20 June.

Pope Francis accepted his resignation on 12 July 2019.

Catholic Church titles
Preceded by Ferenc Keszthelyi	Bishop of Vác; 2003–2019	Succeeded by Zsolt Marton
