= Dömös =

- Village
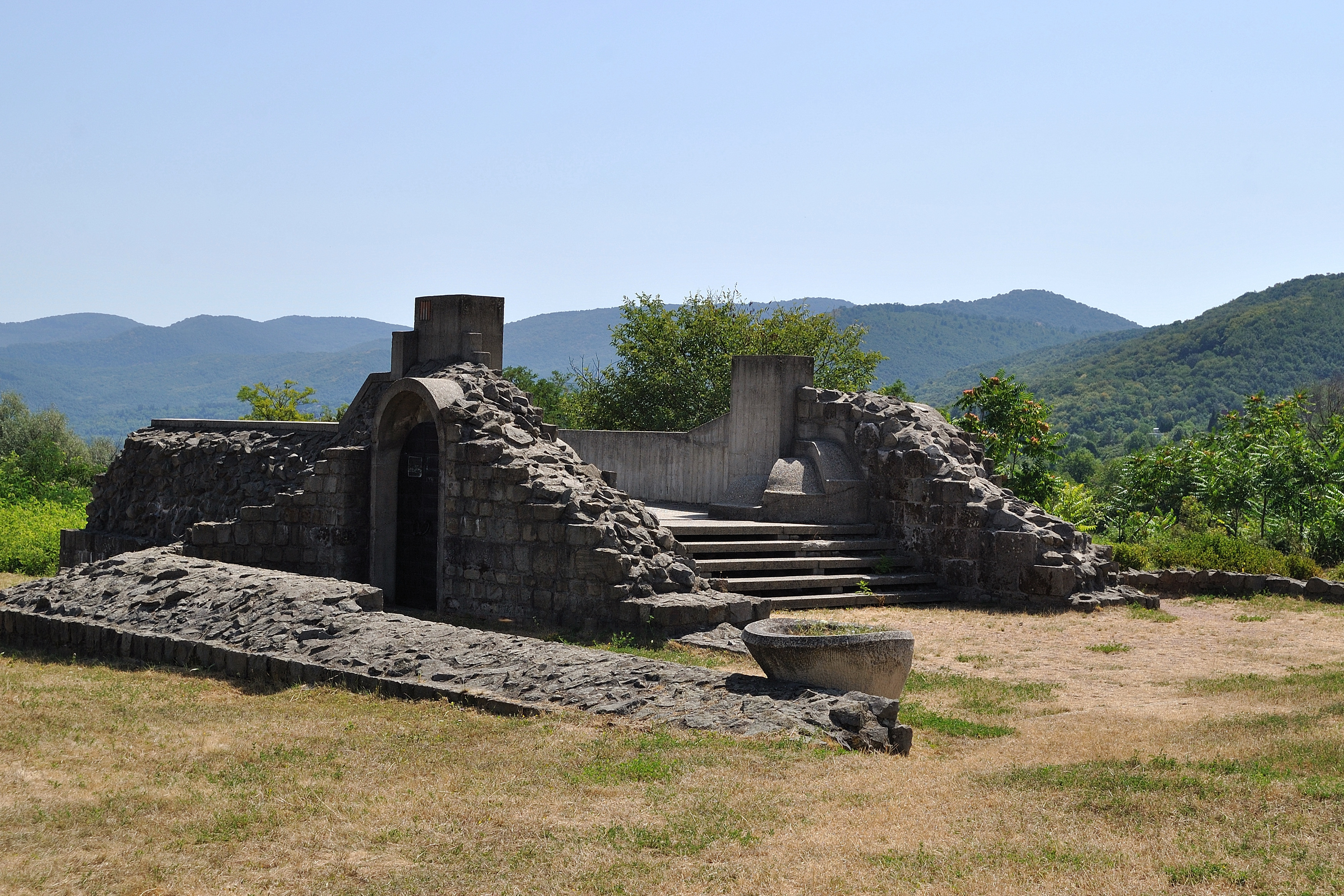
- Ruins of Dömös Chapter

- Flag Coat of arms

- Location of Dömös
- Coordinates: 47.76480°N 18.91437°E
- Country: Hungary
- Region: Central Transdanubia
- County: Komárom-Esztergom
- District: Esztergom

Area
  - Total: 23.97 km^{2} (9.25 sq mi)

Population (1 January 2025)
  - Total: 1,148
  - Density: 47.89/km^{2} (124.0/sq mi)
- Time zone: UTC+1 (CET)
  - Summer (DST): UTC+2 (CEST)
- Postal code: 2027
- Area code: (+36) 33
- Website: www.domos.hu

Dömös is a village in Komárom-Esztergom County in Hungary.

== Setting and geography ==
Dömös is located on the right side of the Danube, 16 km from Esztergom and 45 km from Budapest. Visegrád town is located 5 km east from Dömös. The highway No. 11 cross the village. It has a railway station on the other side of the Danube, on the Budapest – Szob railway line. A shuttle transport on the river.

== History ==
The site has been populated since ancient times. Archaeology revealed men and settlements, instruments and animal bones from hunting and fireplaces dating to the Neolithic. A tomb of a Copper Age man was also found (2500–1900 BC). In the late Bronze Age a 500x500 meter fortress from gounddams (1000 BC). There are guard towers from the Roman Period, which were built along the Danube line of the Pannonia region's border, which formed a frontier of the Roman Empire. (Tófenék). After the Huns, the Avars arrived in 568 and ruled the area until the 9th century. Bronze belt buckles, horse and warrior mounts, ceramics of the Avarian age were excavated from warrior's tombs. (Malom-creek valley).

== Árpád dynasty age ==
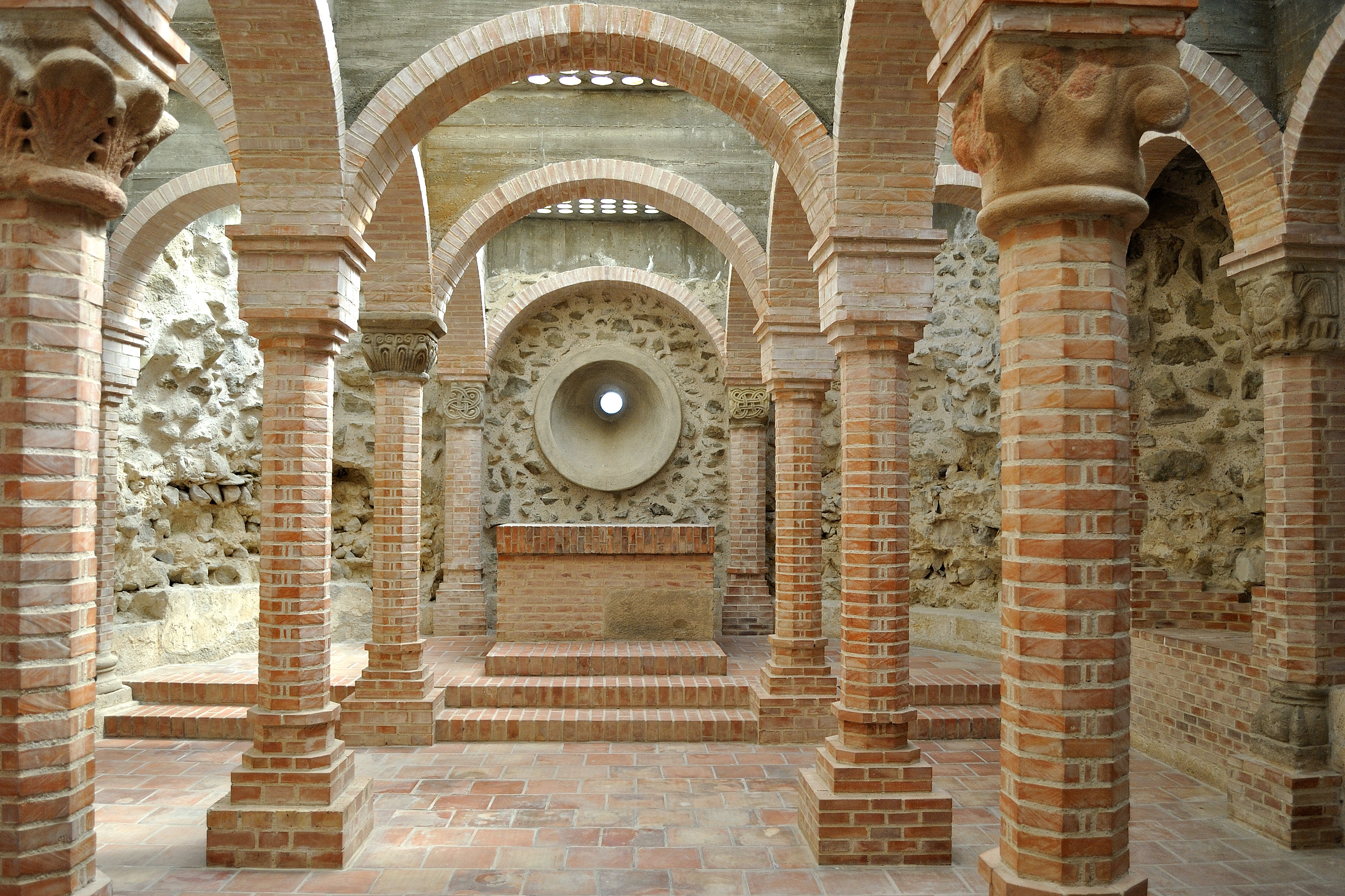
Reconstructed inner space in the Subchurch of the Dömös monastery.

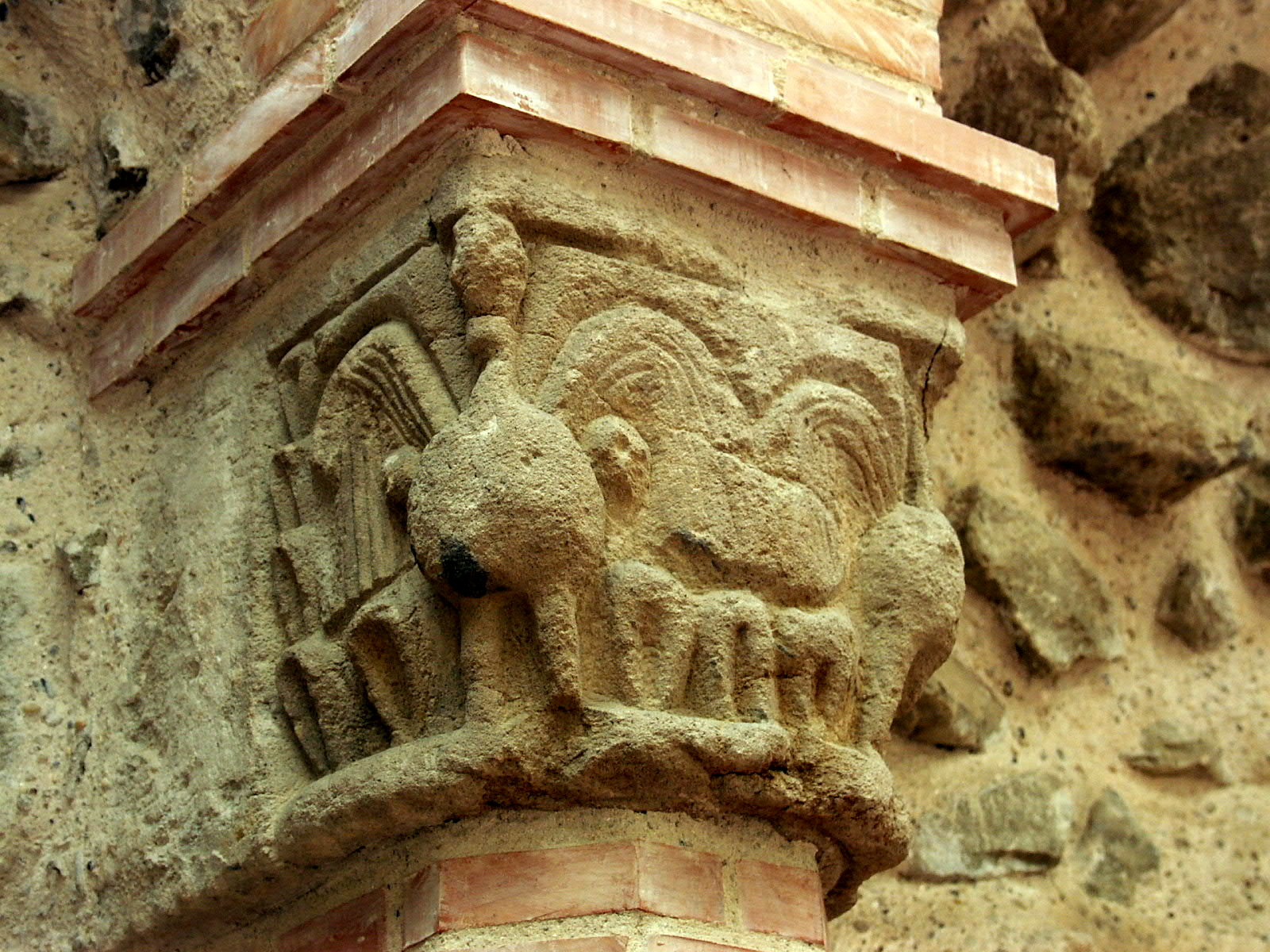
Columnar head with owls in the Subchurch of the Dömös monastery.

There is a groundwork fortress on the top of the Árpád hill from the Hungarian conquest time. The Danube turn gives a good fortification locality and the region was royal domain during the Árpád house kings of Hungary. The region was named Pilis forest. The royal palace and the neighbouring monastery played and important role in the life in the 11th century. Specifically, the life of Béla I of Hungary ended here in 1063. The earliest charter was given out by Ladislaus I of Hungary in 1079. In the 12th century Coloman of Hungary decided about the continuation of the throne for Stephen II of Hungary against the later king Béla II of Hungary. In the Mongolian invasion (1241) the monastery was destroyed, but rebuilt soon. The provost of the monastery also served the king and the royal family. Provost Fülöp was the chancellor of the queen during the times of Béla II of Hungary.

Sigismund, Holy Roman Emperor, who was Zsigmond, king of Hungary, gave the monastery to the dominicant order. (1433-1446). János Hunyadi governor also gave the monastery back to his preferred priest, to Hosszuaszai Bothos István. Pope Alexander VI decided to move the monastery to the diocese of Nyitra. Since that time the Bishop of Nyitra became the provost of Dömös. In 1526 the Turks destroyed the monastery. The ruins stood in the 18th century. The stones from the ruin were used to build the new catholic church of the village.

== Sightseeings ==
The ruins of the Dömös monastery, and the subchurch can be visited. Beautiful heads of columns were preserved and the original carvings can be found in the National Museum in Budapest.
