= Hippolytus (bishop of Vác) =

Hungarian prelate

- Bishop of Vác
- Installed: c. 1156
- Term ended: c. 1157
- Predecessor: Marcellinus (?)
- Successor: Ded

Personal details
- Died: after 1157
- Denomination: Catholic

Hippolytus or Ypolitus (Hungarian: Ipoly) was a prelate in the Kingdom of Hungary in the 12th century, who served as Bishop of Vác from around 1156 to 1157, during the reign of Géza II of Hungary.

== Career ==
Hippolytus became Bishop of Vác sometime after 1139, as his last known predecessor, Marcellinus was last mentioned by sources in that year. Hippolytus appears as a witness in two documents. At first in 1156, when Archbishop Martyrius donated the tithe of surrounding 70 villages to the cathedral chapter of Esztergom. Hippolytus again acted in this capacity in March 1157, when Gervasius, Bishop of Győr interceded with Géza II to grant the collection right of salt duties to the archdiocese at Nána and Kakat (present-day Štúrovo, Slovakia). There, Hippolytus was mentioned without his episcopal see.

== Sources ==
- Galla, Ferenc (1970). "A váci egyházmegye püspökei [The Bishops of the Diocese of Vác]". In Bánk, József (ed.). Váci egyházmegyei almanach Szent István millénium évében (in Hungarian). Roman Catholic Diocese of Vác. pp. 103–201.
- Zsoldos, Attila (2011). Magyarország világi archontológiája, 1000–1301 [Secular Archontology of Hungary, 1000–1301] (in Hungarian). História, MTA Történettudományi Intézete. ISBN 978-963-9627-38-3.

Catholic Church titles
Preceded by Marcellinus (?)	Bishop of Vác; 1156–1157	Succeeded by Ded
