= Denis (bishop of Győr) =

Hungarian bishop

- Bishop of Győr
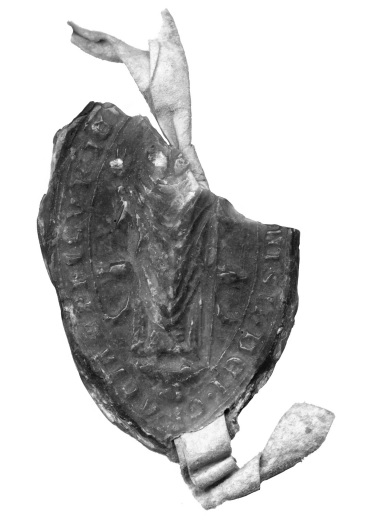
- Seal of Denis, 1279
- Appointed: 1270
- Term ended: 1285
- Predecessor: Farkas Bejc
- Successor: Andrew

Personal details
- Died: 1285/91
- Education: University of Bologna

Denis (Hungarian: Dénes; died after 1285) was a Hungarian prelate in the 13th century, who served as Bishop of Győr from 1270 to 1285.

== Biography ==
Denis was called "frater" ("friar") in a document from 1270, thus he belonged to one of the religious orders (possibly Benedictines or Cistercians). He attended the University of Bologna from 1268 to 1269. He was mentioned as lector of the cathedral chapter of Kalocsa in 1269.

He was made Bishop of Győr in 1270, not long before the death of Béla IV of Hungary, but it is possible that he already held the office from the previous year. He was a confidant of Stephen V of Hungary, who confirmed and transcribed several donations to the Diocese of Győr during his short reign. In 1271, Stephen V also granted the "right of Fehérvár" to Győr, i.e. promoted to the status of free royal town. Upon Denis' request, the monarch extended the right to the subjects of the landholdings of the cathedral chapter (today called Káptalan-Győr).

After the death of Stephen V, the Kingdom of Hungary fell into anarchy, when many baronial groups fought for the supreme power during the nominal rule of the minor Ladislaus IV of Hungary. Under such circumstances, the Diocese of Győr was constantly threatened by the Austrian troops of Ottokar II of Bohemia. Taking advantage of chaotic situation in Hungary, Ottokar's army invaded the borderlands of Hungary in April 1273. The influential prelate, Job Záh arrived to the region with his army and expelled his fellow bishop Denis from the castle of Győr and made himself the captain of the fortress. The Austrians, however, besieged and took the fort. Bishop Job tried to offer resistance in a tower but his enemies set fire on it, thus he was obliged to surrender. Bishop Job was taken in chains into Austria. Ottokar's troops stormed and pillaged the lands of the Diocese of Győr thereafter. When the Hungarian royal army recovered the castle, Denis returned to the town. Thereafter Denis frequently resided in the royal court beside Ladislaus IV and his faction. Following the siege, Denis negotiated with Ottokar over a conclusion of peace. During the 1270s skirmishes, the Győr Cathedral is severely damaged, according to Ladislaus' charter from 1284. Denis took part in the process of reconciliation between Ladislaus and Ottokar beginning since late 1274. In the first months of 1275, he was sent to the Bohemian court to negotiate with the monarch. There, he requested Ottokar II to symbolically adopt the much younger Ladislaus as his son. Denis also represented Ladislaus IV during the negotiations between Ottokar II and Rudolf I of Germany in September 1277.

Denis attended the Synod of Buda in September 1279, convened by the papal legate Philip III, Bishop of Fermo. Denis served as bishop at least until 1285, when he was last mentioned by contemporary records. His immediate successor, Andrew first appeared in this capacity only in 1290 or 1291.

== Sources ==
- Bánk, József, ed. (1968). Győregyházmegyei almanach. Schematizmus Dioecesis Jaurinensis [Almanac of the Diocese of Győr] (in Hungarian). Authority of the Diocese of Győr.
- Győri, Éva (2008). "Győri püspökök a XIII. században [The Bishops of Győr in the 13th Century]". Belvedere Meridionale (in Hungarian). 20 (1–2): 24–43. ISSN 1419-0222.
- Haraszti Szabó, Péter; Kelényi, Borbála (2019). Magyarországi diákok francia, angol, itáliai és német egyetemeken a középkorban, 1100–1526 [Students from Hungary at the Universities of France, England, Italy and Germany in the Middle Ages 1100–1526] (in Hungarian). ELTE Egyetemi Könyvtár és Levéltár; MTA ELTE Egyetemtörténeti Kutatócsoport. ISBN 978-963-489-098-0.
- Rudolf, Veronika (2023). Közép-Európa a hosszú 13. században [Central Europe in the Long 13th Century] (in Hungarian). Arpadiana XV., Research Centre for the Humanities. ISBN 978-963-416-406-7.
- Zsoldos, Attila (2011). Magyarország világi archontológiája, 1000–1301 [Secular Archontology of Hungary, 1000–1301] (in Hungarian). História, MTA Történettudományi Intézete. ISBN 978-963-9627-38-3.

Catholic Church titles
Preceded by Farkas Bejc	Bishop of Győr; 1270–1285	Succeeded by Andrew
