= Philip (bishop of Vác) =

Hungarian prelate

- Bishop of Vác
- Installed: 1262 or before
- Term ended: 1277 or 1278
- Predecessor: Matthias
- Successor: Thomas
- Other posts: Provost of Dömös; Provost-elect of Székesfehérvár

Personal details
- Died: 1277 or 1278
- Denomination: Roman Catholic

Philip (Hungarian: Fülöp; died 1277 or 1278) was a Hungarian prelate in the 13th century, who served as Bishop of Vác from 1262 until his death. He was a confidant of Queen Elizabeth the Cuman, serving her chancellor from 1262 to 1273.

== Early career ==
His origin and parentage is unknown. He was first styled as provost of Dömös in 1257. As a young cleric, he entered the service of Duke Stephen, the son and heir of Béla IV of Hungary. After Stephen was made Duke of Transylvania, Philip served the chancellor of his ducal court from 1257 to 1259. He was a member of his lord's household in Styria in those years, issuing diplomas according to Hungarian chancery practice.

Philip was elected provost of the collegiate chapter of Székesfehérvár in the spring of 1258. His election was never confirmed by the Roman Curia and he was referred to as provost-elect until November 1259. Beside that, he was styled himself vice-chancellor of the royal court in the own charters of the collegiate chapter in 1258 and 1259. Regarding the latter, it is plausible that Philip merely expressed his legal claim based on his position as provost-elect, as the two positions were often combined at that time, since no royal charter refers to him as vice-chancellor. In addition, Smaragd still held the position in September 1258.

== Bishop of Vác ==
Sometime between 1259 and 1262, Philip was elected Bishop of Vác. In October 1261, an unidentified bishop of Vác was granted mandate by Pope Urban IV to judge over a tithe lawsuit between the Pannonhalma Abbey and the cathedral chapter of Veszprém. This data perhaps refers to Philip or his predecessor Matthias, who last appears as bishop in 1259. Philip was first styled as bishop on 5 December 1262, when Duke Stephen took an oath at Poroszló and confirmed his reconciliation with his father, King Béla IV after their brief clash in accordance with the Peace of Pressburg, which was concluded in the autumn of 1262 with the mediation of archbishops Philip Türje of Esztergom and Smaragd of Kalocsa, in addition to the attendance of Philip, Benedict, Provost of Szeben and John, Provost of Arad. Philip took part in the process as a confidant of Stephen, who adopted the title of rex iunior as a consequence of the treaty. Philip served as chancellor of Stephen's consort, Elizabeth the Cuman from 1262 at least until 1265, but it is plausible that he held the office until 1270, when Stephen ascended the Hungarian throne.

In 1266, he acted as a co-judge on behalf of rex iunior Stephen in the lawsuit between the Diocese of Veszprém and the relatives of the late Zlaudus Ják over the two castles of Tátika. In December of the same year, Pope Clement IV ordered Philip and his superior Philip Türje to install Stephen Báncsa as the new Archbishop of Kalocsa. Philip attended the funeral of Stephen's sister, the Dominican nun Margaret on 21 January 1270. Thereafter, Pope Gregory X commissioned Philip Türje, Philip and the abbot of Zirc to investigate her miracles in order to prepare Margaret's canonization. This committee was set up in late 1271 and after a year and a half of work, it submitted the protocol to Rome. After Stephen V ascended the Hungarian throne in May 1270, Philip became chancellor of the queen, effectively retaining his former position in the court of Elizabeth who became queen consort after her husband's coronation. He served in this capacity until August 1272, Stephen's death and thus Elizabeth's widowhood. In July 1271, Philip was one of the ecclesiastical guarantors of the Peace of Pressburg which concluded the war between Stephen V and Ottokar II of Bohemia took place in that year. In May 1272, Pope Gregory X assigned Philip Türje, Philip of Vác, Bruno of Olomouc and John of Prague to do everything possible to preserve peace and to comply with the terms of the treaty.

After the death of Stephen V in August 1272, Philip continued to serve Elizabeth as her chancellor now in the dowager queen's court. He held this position until July 1273, when he became chancellor of the queen's court after the coronation of Isabella of Sicily, the spouse of Ladislaus IV of Hungary, holding the dignity until his death in 1277. Additionally, Philip administered Nógrád County as ispán at least from 1272 to 1274. It is possible he held this position until his death too. Philip was the first prelate in Hungary who was appointed as judge-delegate by the Roman Curia, when he received a papal mandate from Pope Gregory X in June 1274 in a lawsuit involving the Pannonhalma Abbey and Denis Péc, who had caused damage to the abbey's property in Győr County. Philip died sometime between November 1277 and May 1278. He was succeeded as bishop by Thomas.

== Sources ==
- Barabás, Gábor (2023). Delegated Papal Jurisdiction in Arpadian Hungary. Bishops – provosts – papal chaplains. Arpadiana XVI., Research Centre for the Humanities. ISBN 978-963-416-405-0.
- Galla, Ferenc (1970). "A váci egyházmegye püspökei [The Bishops of the Diocese of Vác]". In Bánk, József (ed.). Váci egyházmegyei almanach Szent István millénium évében (in Hungarian). Roman Catholic Diocese of Vác. pp. 103–201.
- Kertész, Balázs (2022). A székesfehérvári káptalan archontológiája és oklevéladó tevékenysége az Árpád-korban [The Archontology and Diploma Issuing Activity of the Chapter of Székesfehérvár in the Age of Árpáds] (in Hungarian). Városi Levéltár és Kutatóintézet. ISBN 978-963-8406-27-9.
- Rudolf, Veronika (2023). Közép-Európa a hosszú 13. században [Central Europe in the Long 13th Century] (in Hungarian). Arpadiana XV., Research Centre for the Humanities. ISBN 978-963-416-406-7.
- Thoroczkay, Gábor (2012). "A dömösi prépostság története alapításától I. Károly uralkodásának végéig [The History of the Provostry of Dömös from Its Foundation Until the End of the Reign of Charles I]". Fons (in Hungarian). 19 (4). Szentpétery Imre Történettudományi Alapítvány: 409–433. ISSN 1217-8020.
- Zsoldos, Attila (2011). Magyarország világi archontológiája, 1000–1301 [Secular Archontology of Hungary, 1000–1301] (in Hungarian). História, MTA Történettudományi Intézete. ISBN 978-963-9627-38-3.

Catholic Church titles
Preceded by Smaragd	Provost of Székesfehérvár (elected); 1258–1259	Succeeded by Paul Balog (elected)
Preceded by Matthias	Bishop of Vác; 1262–1277	Succeeded by Thomas
Political offices
Preceded by Smaragd	Vice-chancellor; 1258–(1259)	Succeeded by Paul Balog
Preceded by Paul Balog	Chancellor of the Queen; 1270–1272, 1273–1277	Succeeded by Peter Kőszegi
Preceded by Thomas	Ispán of Nógrád; 1272–1274	Succeeded by Aladar Forrói
