= Mihály Endrey-Eipel =

Hungarian bishop

Mihály Endrey-Eipel (born 2 November 1905 in Budapest – 4 July 1977) was a Hungarian clergyman and bishop for the Roman Catholic Diocese of Vác. He became ordained in 1928. He was appointed bishop in 1950. He died on 4 July 1977, at the age of 71.
