= Matthias (bishop of Vác) =

Hungarian prelate

- Bishop of Vác
- Installed: 1254/1259
- Term ended: 1259/1262
- Predecessor: Heimo
- Successor: Philip

Personal details
- Died: after 1259
- Denomination: Catholic

Matthias (Hungarian: Mátyás; died after 1259) was a Hungarian prelate in the mid-13th century, who served as Bishop of Vác in 1259, during the reign of Béla IV of Hungary.

== Career ==
Earlier historiography identified him with Matthias Hermán, who was provost of Szepes. He succeeded Heimo, who is last mentioned as bishop in 1254. Matthias' name occurs only once, when King Béla IV donated Pilis County to his spouse Maria Laskarina in 1259. In October 1261, an unidentified bishop of Vác was granted mandate by Pope Urban IV to judge over a tithe lawsuit between the Pannonhalma Abbey and the cathedral chapter of Veszprém. This data perhaps refers to Matthias or his successor Philip, who first appears as bishop in 1262.

== Sources ==
- Barabás, Gábor (2023). Delegated Papal Jurisdiction in Arpadian Hungary. Bishops – provosts – papal chaplains. Arpadiana XVI., Research Centre for the Humanities. ISBN 978-963-416-405-0.
- Galla, Ferenc (1970). "A váci egyházmegye püspökei [The Bishops of the Diocese of Vác]". In Bánk, József (ed.). Váci egyházmegyei almanach Szent István millénium évében (in Hungarian). Roman Catholic Diocese of Vác. pp. 103–201.
- Zsoldos, Attila (2011). Magyarország világi archontológiája, 1000–1301 [Secular Archontology of Hungary, 1000–1301] (in Hungarian). História, MTA Történettudományi Intézete. ISBN 978-963-9627-38-3.

Catholic Church titles
| Preceded by Heimo | Bishop of Vác; 1259 | Succeeded by Philip |
