= Ded (bishop of Vác) =

Medieval Hungarian bishop

- Bishop of Vác
- Installed: after 1157
- Predecessor: Hippolytus
- Successor: Job (?)

Personal details
- Denomination: Catholic

Ded (also Deda or Didák) was a prelate in the Kingdom of Hungary in the 12th century, who served as Bishop of Vác during the reign of Géza II of Hungary.

== Career ==
Ded was elected Bishop of Vác sometime after 1157, when his predecessor Hippolytus was last mentioned by contemporary records. The name of Ded appears in a single document without the exact date. Accordingly, Géza II ordered Ded of Vác and Chama of Eger to rededicate the Szentjobb Abbey (present-day Sâniob in Romania) with the consent of Lucas, Archbishop of Esztergom. Consequently, the narration occurred sometime between 1158 (Lucas' ascension to the see of Esztergom) and 1162 (the death of Géza II).

The aforementioned document was issued by Géza's son and successor Stephen III of Hungary, who narrated in his charter that the Benedictine monastery of Szentjobb was attacked and plundered by the sons of a certain "Palatine Paul" thereafter. As a result, Archbishop Lucas excommunicated them. The charter was later transcribed by both Béla III of Hungary and Charles I of Hungary and preserved until the 18th century. Its text was published and annotated by Croatian historian Baltazar Adam Krčelić in his work Historiarum cathedralis ecclesiae Zagrabiensis partis primae tomus I, and it is the only surviving text form as the original charter is lost. Historian Tamás Körmendi questioned the validity of the issuance, which suffers from 18th-century misinterpretations, explanations, anachronisms and factual errors made by plausibly Krčelić, thus the authenticity of the original lost royal charter is also uncertain.

According to 18th-century historians István Katona and György Pray, Ded still held the dignity of Bishop of Vác in 1169, but there is no source of that. The next known bishop Job elevated into the position only in 1181.

== Sources ==
- Galla, Ferenc (1970). "A váci egyházmegye püspökei [The Bishops of the Diocese of Vác]". In Bánk, József (ed.). Váci egyházmegyei almanach Szent István millénium évében (in Hungarian). Roman Catholic Diocese of Vác. pp. 103–201.
- Körmendi, Tamás (2003). "Lukács [Lucas]". In Beke, Margit (ed.). Esztergomi érsekek 1001–2003 [Archbishops of Esztergom 1001–2003] (in Hungarian). Szent István Társulat. pp. 59–72. ISBN 963-361-472-4.
- Zsoldos, Attila (2011). Magyarország világi archontológiája, 1000–1301 [Secular Archontology of Hungary, 1000–1301] (in Hungarian). História, MTA Történettudományi Intézete. ISBN 978-963-9627-38-3.

Catholic Church titles
Preceded by Hippolytus	Bishop of Vác c. 1158–1162	Succeeded by Job (?)
