= Ferenc Keszthelyi =

Catholic bishop in Hungary

Ferenc Keszthelyi O. Cist.
- Bishop of Vác
- Church: Catholic Church
- Diocese: Diocese of Vác
- In office: 11 February 1992 – 27 March 2003
- Predecessor: Izidor Marosi
- Successor: Miklós Beer

Orders
- Ordination: 2 April 1951
- Consecration: 21 March 1992 by László Paskai

Personal details
- Born: 16 March 1928 Eger, Heves County, Kingdom of Hungary
- Died: 6 December 2010 (aged 82)

Ferenc Keszthelyi, O. Cist (16 March 1928 – 6 December 2010) was the Roman Catholic Bishop Emeritus of the Roman Catholic Diocese of Vác, Hungary.

Born in Eger, he was ordained on 2 April 1951, aged 23 in the Order of Cistercians. On 11 February 1992, aged 63, he was appointed Bishop of Vác, and ordained the following month.

On 27 March 2003, aged 75, he retired and became Bishop Emeritus. He died on 6 December 2010, aged 82.
