= Andrew (bishop of Győr) =

Hungarian bishop

- Bishop of Győr
- Appointed: 1291
- Term ended: 1294
- Predecessor: Denis
- Successor: Theodore Tengerdi

Personal details
- Died: 1294 or 1295

Andrew (Hungarian: András; died 1294 or 1295) was a Hungarian prelate in the 13th century, who served as Bishop of Győr from 1291 until his death.

== Biography ==
His origin is uncertain, but he was born into a large family. His three brothers earned university degree. Andrew was an educated prelate and skilled in theology and science. He was styled as doctor of canon law in 1283, thus possibly attended the University of Bologna or other Italian universitas. He was provost of Szenttamás (lit. "Saint Thomas" after Thomas Becket), which laid nearby Esztergom. Andrew served as grand provost of Esztergom between 1282 and 1286. Beside that he was referred to as chancellor of the court of Archbishop Lodomer from 1284 to 1286.

Andrew was made Bishop of Győr by February 1291, but according to non-authentic charters, he already held the office in July 1290. He was a confidant of Andrew III of Hungary and supported his efforts in order to strengthen royal power against the powerful lords and oligarchs. He participated in the military campaign against the Duchy of Austria in 1291, when Andrew III invaded Austria, forcing Duke Albert to withdraw his garrisons from the towns and fortresses that he had captured years before. Subsequently, he was a participant of the negotiations, which concluded the war. He attended the provincial synod of Esztergom, convened by Archbishop Lodomer on 6 May 1292. Andrew was last mentioned as a living person by contemporary records in August 1294. He died by April 1295, when his successor, Theodore Tengerdi first appeared as bishop-elect.

== Sources ==
- Bánk, József, ed. (1968). Győregyházmegyei almanach. Schematizmus Dioecesis Jaurinensis [Almanac of the Diocese of Győr] (in Hungarian). Authority of the Diocese of Győr.
- Diós, István (1993). Magyar katolikus lexikon [Hungarian Catholic Lexicon] Vol. I (in Hungarian). Szent István Kiadó. ISBN 963-3607-18-3.
- Győri, Éva (2008). "Győri püspökök a XIII. században [The Bishops of Győr in the 13th Century]". Belvedere Meridionale (in Hungarian). 20 (1–2): 24–43. ISSN 1419-0222.
- Haraszti Szabó, Péter; Kelényi, Borbála (2019). Magyarországi diákok francia, angol, itáliai és német egyetemeken a középkorban, 1100–1526 [Students from Hungary at the Universities of France, England, Italy and Germany in the Middle Ages 1100–1526] (in Hungarian). ELTE Egyetemi Könyvtár és Levéltár; MTA ELTE Egyetemtörténeti Kutatócsoport. ISBN 978-963-489-098-0.
- Zsoldos, Attila (2011). Magyarország világi archontológiája, 1000–1301 [Secular Archontology of Hungary, 1000–1301] (in Hungarian). História, MTA Történettudományi Intézete. ISBN 978-963-9627-38-3.

Catholic Church titles
Preceded by Denis	Bishop of Győr; 1291–1294	Succeeded by Theodore Tengerdi
