= Seraphin Zselizi =

Hungarian cleric

- Provost of Pressburg
- Installed: 1294
- Term ended: 1311
- Predecessor: Haab
- Successor: Philip
- Other post: Provost of Esztergom–Szentgyörgy

Personal details
- Died: March/April 1311
- Denomination: Roman Catholic
- Parents: Demetrius Zselizi; N Türje
- Education: University of Bologna

Seraphin Zselizi (Hungarian: Zselizi Szerafin; died March/April 1311) was a Hungarian clergyman at the turn of the 13th and 14th centuries, who served as provost of Pressburg from 1294 until his death.

== Family and studies ==
Seraphin was born into a noble family which possessed lands in Bars and Nyitra counties in Upper Hungary. According to historian György Györffy, the Zselizi family originated from the Bény branch of the gens (clan) Hont-Pázmány. His parents were Demetrius Zselizi and an unidentified noblewoman from the gens (clan) Türje. His maternal uncle and mentor was Philip Türje, the Archbishop of Esztergom from 1262 to 1272. Seraphin had at least three brothers John, Roland and Joachim. The latter served as archdeacon of Komarnica (or Kamarcsa, present-day Novigrad Podravski, Croatia) in the Diocese of Zagreb in 1269.

Both Joachim and Seraphin entered ecclesiastical career under the patronage of their uncle Philip Türje. They attended the University of Bologna in 1269–1270. Joachim, Seraphin and fellow Hungarian students (Henry of Esztergom, Nicholas of Nyitra and James of Pécs) owed altogether 50 bolognini. In July 1270, they owed 70 bolognini.

== Ecclesiastical career ==
Returning Hungary, Seraphin became a canon of the cathedral chapter of Esztergom. He held this benefice at least from 1274 until his death. In 1274, their relative James, son of Lampert filed a lawsuit against the other members of the Zselizi family, including John and Seraphin, over the division of the ancient family estate Zseliz (present-day Želiezovce, Slovakia) along the river Garam (Hron). Seraphin was styled as deacon of the cathedral chapter of Esztergom in 1282. He served as provost of Esztergom–Szentgyörgy from 1286 to 1293. In this capacity, Seraphin took part in the mediation process in the conflict between James, the provost of Szepes, and the collegiate chapter. In 1293, Seraphin agreed on the division contract of the family estates Zseliz and Mikola (present-day a borough of Želiezovce) with his neighbor Peter Mezőpilis, who handed over 70 acres of land to the provost accordingly, following a brief border conflict between them.

Seraphin was elected provost of Pressburg prior to July 1294, holding the dignity until his death in 1311, while he retained his position of canon in Esztergom too. He represented the collegiate chapter against the city in a lawsuit when he was first styled as provost. Alongside other canons from Esztergom, he acted as a co-judge in Kál in Zala County over a lawsuit regarding the church of Tördemic in 1297. Pope Boniface VIII ordered Seraphin of Pressburg, Stephen, the abbot of Pilis and canon Scholasticus of Esztergom in December 1299 to judge over the lawsuit between Benedict Rád, Bishop of Veszprém and the nunnery in Veszprém Valley concerning the latter's tithe exemption. He was given the same mandate, alongside Stephen of Pilis and Ciprian, the lector of Esztergom, by Pope Boniface sometime before December 1301, when Ciprian complained that the lawsuit had already been postponed twice and had then failed to proceed owing to the absence of his two fellow judges, Seraphin and Stephen, and no deputies had been sent in their places. As a result, Stephen Kéki, the provost of Veszprém had objected to the proceedings. In 1300, Seraphin launched an investigation before the cathedral chapter of Győr against the Szentgyörgyi family, who – according to his own narration – seized and usurped the estate Csukárd (present-day a borough of Vinosady, Slovakia) from the chapter of Pressburg. In the same year, he represented the chapter of Esztergom in a lawsuit. In March 1301, he issued a document on a dowry agreement, which is notable for the fact that it uses all sorts of calendar that were long obsolete in Hungary at that time. In early January 1302, he appointed a minor called Nicholas, son a wealthy local burgher James, to fill the vacated position of fifth canon. Some weeks later, on 24 January, he testified before the court of papal legate Niccolò Boccasini regarding the Szepes chapter's right to elect a provost. On the same day, Seraphin, alongside abbot Nicholas of Pannonhalma, judged over a lawsuit regarding the jurisdiction of the church built in the village Dénesd (present-day a borough of Dunajská Lužná, Slovakia), where the parties agreed. In March 1302, Seraphin and the chapter reached an agreement with city judge Hertlinus and the Pressburg city council on the issue of the method of parish elections.

Seraphin attended the provincial synod convoked by Thomas, Archbishop of Esztergom to Udvard, Komárom County (present-day Dvory nad Žitavou, Slovakia) in May 1307. There, upon the advice of Seraphin, the archbishop permitted to build a chapel in Nyárasd (present-day Topoľníky, Slovakia) in May 1307. Archbishop Thomas ordered Seraphin, together with John, the lector of Esztergom and Pelagius, the provost of Esztergom–Szenttamás, to judge over a conflict between the abbeys of Tihany and Zalavár in the spring of 1308. As deacon of the ceremony, Seraphin assisted Archbishop Thomas at the second coronation of King Charles I of Hungary in Buda on 15 June 1309. Seraphin and his brother Roland handed over a portion in Zseliz to the latter's son-in-law Nicholas Terpényi, the castellan of the archiepiscopal castle of Berzence on 14 March 1311. Seraphin died shortly thereafter; he was referred to as a deceased person by the chapter of Pressburg on 22 April 1311.

== Sources ==
- Barabás, Gábor (2023). Delegated Papal Jurisdiction in Arpadian Hungary. Bishops – provosts – papal chaplains. Arpadiana XVI., Research Centre for the Humanities. ISBN 978-963-416-405-0.
- C. Tóth, Norbert (2019). Az esztergomi székes- és társaskáptalanok archontológiája 1100–1543 [Archontology of the Cathedral and Collegiate Chapters of Esztergom, 1100–1543] (in Hungarian). Magyar Tudományos Akadémia Magyar Medievisztikai Kutatócsoportja. ISBN 978-963-508-913-0.
- C. Tóth, Norbert (2020). A pozsonyi társaskáptalan archontológiája, 1204–1462 [Archontology of the Collegiate Chapter of Pressburg, 1204–1462] (in Hungarian). Subsidia ad historiam medii aevi Hungariae inquirendam 12., National Archives of Hungary. ISSN 1787-9213.
- Györffy, György (1987). Az Árpád-kori Magyarország történeti földrajza, I: Abaújvár, Arad, Árva, Bács, Baranya, Bars, Békés, Bereg, Beszterce, Bihar, Bodrog, Borsod, Brassó, Csanád és Csongrád megye [Historical Geography of Hungary of the Árpáds, Volume I: The Counties of Abaújvár, Arad, Árva, Bács, Baranya, Bars, Békés, Bereg, Beszterce, Bihar, Bodrog, Borsod, Brassó, Csanád and Csongrád] (in Hungarian). Akadémiai Kiadó. ISBN 963-05-4200-5.
- Haraszti Szabó, Péter; Kelényi, Borbála (2019). Magyarországi diákok francia, angol, itáliai és német egyetemeken a középkorban, 1100–1526 [Students from Hungary at the Universities of France, England, Italy and Germany in the Middle Ages 1100–1526] (in Hungarian). ELTE Egyetemi Könyvtár és Levéltár; MTA ELTE Egyetemtörténeti Kutatócsoport. ISBN 978-963-489-098-0.
- Knauz, Nándor (1881). "A pozsonyi prépostság [The Provostry of Pressburg]". Uj Magyar Sion (in Hungarian). 12: 108–130.
- Maléth, Ágnes (2020). A Magyar Királyság és a Szentszék kapcsolata I. Károly korában (1301–1342) [The Relationship of the Hungarian Kingdom and the Holy See in the time of Charles I (1301–1342)] (in Hungarian). Pécsi Tudományegyetem BTK TTI Középkori és Koraújkori Történeti Tanszék. ISBN 978-963-429-500-6.
- Varga, Virág (2024). "A Türje nembeli Szentgrótiak a 13. században és a 14. század első felében [The Szentgróti Family of the Türje Kindred in the 13th Century and the First Half of 14th Century]". In Hunyadi, Sándor; et al. (eds.). Micae Mediaevales XIII (in Hungarian). Eötvös Loránd University. pp. 121–149. ISSN 2062-2198.

Catholic Church titles
| Preceded by Urban | Provost of Esztergom–Szentgyörgy; 1286–1293 | Succeeded by Emeric |
| Preceded by Haab | Provost of Pressburg; 1294–1311 | Succeeded by Philip |
