= Thomas (bishop of Vác) =

Hungarian prelate

- Bishop of Vác
- Installed: 1278
- Term ended: 1289
- Predecessor: Philip
- Successor: Theodore Tengerdi (elected)
- Other posts: Provost of Hánta; Provost of Székesfehérvár

Personal details
- Died: February/June 1289 Margaret Island, Hungary
- Denomination: Roman Catholic

Thomas (Hungarian: Tamás; died between February and June 1289) was a Hungarian prelate in the 13th century, who served as Bishop of Vác from 1278 until his assassination. Simultaneously, he served in the royal court in various positions. He was a faithful confidant of King Ladislaus IV of Hungary.

== Early career ==
Thomas was born into a prestigious noble family. He had four brothers, John, Christopher, Paul and Stephen. John functioned as castellan of Visegrád in 1284, serving under his brother, who held the ispánate of Pilis County during that time. The Bedeković family, which rose to prominence in the Kingdom of Croatia by the 17–18th centuries, descended from one of Thomas' brothers.

His early life and career is narrated by a non-authentic charter, attributing to Ladislaus IV with the date 22 December 1283, which, however, contains factual elements. Thomas and John raised in the court of Béla IV of Hungary, who patronized him in the advancement of his clerical career. Thomas and his brothers acquired a portion in Kemlék in Križevci County (today Kalnik, Croatia) in a courtesy of Béla IV in January 1265. Thomas was styled as royal special notary between 1266 and 1267. Under Béla's reign, Thomas completed diplomatic trips to the Kingdom of Galicia–Volhynia and the Kingdom of Bohemia. For their service in the court, Béla IV donated the lands Bugna near Zalavár in Zala County and Komor (or Kumor) in Varaždin County in the region Zagorje (present-day Bedekovčina, Croatia) to Thomas and his four brothers in 1267. The latter place subsequently became the permanent residence of the Bedeković family. Béla's youngest son, Béla, Duke of Slavonia confirmed the latter donation in 1268. The duke also confirmed his father's another donation regarding the portion in Kemlék to Thomas and his brothers in the same year. Around 1268 and 1269, Thomas and his brothers were granted the right of exception from the jurisdiction of the local ispán in Križevci County; they could appeal directly to the ban of Slavonia. Thomas was referred to as archdeacon of Veszprém in the same period. Béla IV also donated the land Nyulas in Moson County (today Jois, Austria) to Thomas solely.

Thomas served as provost of the collegiate chapter of Hánta from 1270 to 1277 or 1278 (present-day a borough in Kisbér), which laid in the territory of the Diocese of Veszprém. Beside that, he was also a canon of the cathedral chapter of Győr between 1270 and 1271, and was styled as royal familiaris clericus in 1270. With the permission of the new monarch Stephen V of Hungary, Thomas donated the estate Nyulas to the provostry of Hánta in 1270. Otherwise, the king transcribed and confirmed all former royal letters of donations (i.e. Komor, Kemlék, Bugna) to the provost and his brothers in the same year. Still in 1270, Thomas handed over the estate Bugna to his familiaris Tristan, son of William. Later, Thomas, as provost of Hánta, sold the estate Nyulas to Abbot Boniface of Pannonhalma for 20 silver marks with the consent of the chapter of Győr. It is plausible that Thomas compensated his provostry with other land from his family wealth. During the Bohemian–Hungarian War in 1271, Stephen V sent Thomas, along with Paul Balog and Roland Rátót, to the court of Ottokar II of Bohemia in mid-May to negotiate a ceasefire with the Bohemian king. This mission, however, only served to delay time so that Stephen could prepare for the open battle against Ottokar.

== Prelate and royal offices ==
Following the death of Stephen V, Thomas was considered a supporter of Ladislaus IV. The young monarch confirmed him as owner of Kemlék in July 1275. He was referred to as "royal [special or secret] notary and envoy" ("apocrisiarius") and head of the royal chapel (Latin: comes capelle) for a brief time in the first half of 1277. Due to the devastation of the Diocese of Veszprém during the civil war in the previous year, Thomas – citing his faithful service in diplomacy during the reigns of Béla IV, Stephen V and Ladislaus IV – requested Ladislaus to donate the royal estate Ecsi and three lands called Beyr to the provostry of Hánta as compensation for the losses. For his service, Ladislaus IV donated another lands in Moson County to the provostry in the same time. Around August or September 1277, Thomas was elected Provost of Székesfehérvár and also became vice-chancellor of the royal court. He was elected Bishop of Vác by the second week of Pentecost (8 May) in 1278, replacing Philip, who died at the turn of 1277 and 1278. Thomas was present in Csanád (today Cenad, Romania) in June 1278, when the king pardoned the rebellious lord Stephen Gutkeled. He took part in the Battle on the Marchfeld on 26 August 1278.

After papal legate Philip of Fermo arrived to the Kingdom of Hungary in early 1279, Thomas belonged to his accompaniment and resided in Buda. He participated in a general assembly in July 1279, which adopted the so-called Cuman laws in order to baptize and settle the Cumans. The text prescribed that the Cumans should leave their tents and live "in houses attached to the ground". In addition, the laws recorded the place of the final settlement of the Cumans in the land, among others, between the rivers Danube and Tisza. In the latter respect, Philip entrusted Thomas with a baron and two local noblemen to visit each Cuman tribes (or clans) in the region between the two rivers in order to supervise the enforcement of the Cuman laws. Thomas also attended the national synod at Buda in September 1279, convened by the papal legate. For unknown reasons, Philip refused to confirm the election of Gerard as provost of Buda and sent the case to the Holy See in 1280. Years later, in November 1282, Pope Martin IV commissioned Thomas to investigate the circumstances of his election and confirm Gerard to his position.

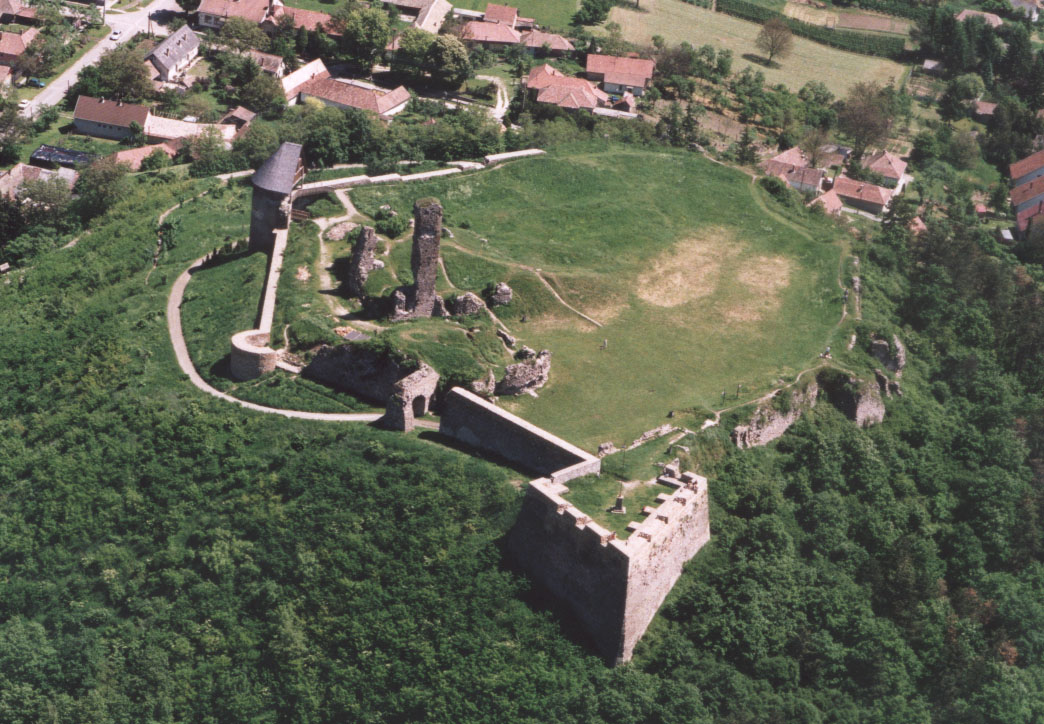
The castle of Nógrád became property of the Diocese of Vác during Thomas' episcopate

By 1280, Thomas and his brothers entered the service of Queen Isabella of Sicily, the spouse of Ladislaus IV. Thomas functioned as chancellor of the queenly court from 1280 to 1284. Beside that he administered Pilis County between 1281 and 1284. During that time, the Pilis royal estate belonged to the property of Isabella. Under Thomas, his brother John served as castellan of Visegrád, an important royal fortress in Pilis County. Thomas and his kinship enjoyed the confidence of both King Ladislaus IV and Queen Isabella, despite the tensions between the royal couple. In December 1283, Thomas and his brothers, comes John, Christopher and Stephen (plausibly Paul was deceased by then) acquired all Slavonian lands and accessories of the disloyal Zaheus, son of Adrian, who was killed when unlawfully laid siege to the castle of comes Germanus, through a royal donation made by the king. In 1283–1284, Thomas, John, Christopher and Stephen (they were called "reginal youth") were granted two villages called Véte in Somogy County, which previously were estates of the queenly tárnoks (treasurers), and Pér near Szalacs (present-day Pir and Sălacea in Romania, respectively) by Queen Isabella. According to the queen's praise, "in his pastoral office, he [Thomas] acts with godly aspiration, following the example of Moses, who went up the mountain to see the glory of God more freely, then went down to the camp to satisfy the needs of the people; he also lived a contemplative life, and then actively participated in the service of God, in royal missions and activities", adopting the decisions of the synod of Buda. Due to their permanent absence from the province, the landholdings of Thomas and his brothers in Slavonia were constantly pillaged and ransacked by the local oligarchic powers, the Kőszegis and Babonići. Therefore, King Ladislaus donated two portions in Gamás in Somogy County to John as a compensation in the autumn of 1284. Thomas was dismissed as ispán in 1284 (or 1285), when Ladislaus IV confiscated the Pilis royal forest and the fort of Visegrád from his alienated wife Isabella, and the county became a royal property again.

Thomas was made chancellor of the royal court in the spring of 1284. His last known predecessor John Hont-Pázmány was last mentioned in this capacity in early 1279, which clearly indicates the regression and decline of the bureaucratic structure. He was frequently called incorrectly vice-chancellor by contemporary sources in the upcoming years; the roles of the two offices were not clear due to the disintegrating government. Ladislaus IV spent the last years of his life wandering from place to place, while Hungary's central government lost power because the prelates and the barons ruled the kingdom independently of the monarch, causing a constant anarchy. The king, who preferred the Cumans' way of life, politically isolated, but Thomas was among the few who kept their loyalty to the monarch and remained members of his dwindling entourage. In August 1285, Thomas rented the fortified archiepiscopal mansion and stone tower on Margaret Island from Archbishop Lodomer of Esztergom for eight years, in order to protect his assets and treasures. Ladislaus IV handed over the royal castle of Nógrád and its lordship to the Diocese of Vác for eternity around 1284 or 1285. Thereafter, local nobles attacked Thomas' nearby village called Heym, causing a damage of 200 marks for him. Ladislaus confiscated the estates from the sons of one of the attackers, Kemény, who was killed during the skirmish, and donated them to Thomas in August 1286. For a brief time, Thomas was owner of the land Bana in Buda, after Ladislaus donated him in 1288, but the bishop turned the donation back after he learned that it was the rightful property of the local collegiate chapter. Prior to his death, Thomas unlawfully seized the village Osztroluka in Zólyom County (present-day Ostrá Lúka, Slovakia) from the original possessor Zyman.

Thomas was last mentioned as a living person in February 1289. Sometime between February and June, Thomas was assassinated within the walls of the aforementioned archiepiscopal fort by an unidentified lord during a harsh dispute because of his alleged pro-Ladislaus and pro-Cuman political positions. He was succeeded as chancellor by Gregory, Bishop of Csanád in June 1289. Ladislaus IV returned the usurped land Osztroluka to Zyman thereafter. After the unsuccessful candidacy of Theodore Tengerdi, Ladislaus was elected as Bishop of Vác by the end of June 1289.

== Sources ==
- Galla, Ferenc (1970). "A váci egyházmegye püspökei [The Bishops of the Diocese of Vác]". In Bánk, József (ed.). Váci egyházmegyei almanach Szent István millénium évében (in Hungarian). Roman Catholic Diocese of Vác. pp. 103–201.
- Karlinszky, Balázs (2016). "Hántai prépost a győri székeskáptalanban. A hántai prépostok középkori veszprémi kanonokságáról Csepelyi Benedek példája alapján [A Provost of Hánta in the Cathedral Chapter of Győr. About the medieval Veszprém prebendary of the provosts of Hánta by the example of Benedek Csepelyi]". In Arató, György; Nemes, Gábor; Vajk, Ádám (eds.). Primus inter omnes. Tanulmányok Bedy Vince születésének 150. évfordulójára (in Hungarian). Győri Egyházmegyei Levéltár. pp. 65–79. ISBN 978-615-5035-13-5.
- Markó, László (2006). A magyar állam főméltóságai Szent Istvántól napjainkig: Életrajzi Lexikon [Great Officers of State in Hungary from King Saint Stephen to Our Days: A Biographical Encyclopedia] (in Hungarian). Helikon Kiadó. ISBN 963-208-970-7.
- Rudolf, Veronika (2023). Közép-Európa a hosszú 13. században [Central Europe in the Long 13th Century] (in Hungarian). Arpadiana XV., Research Centre for the Humanities. ISBN 978-963-416-406-7.
- Szentpétery, Imre (1961). Az Árpád-házi királyok okleveleinek kritikai jegyzéke II. kötet 2–3. füzet, 1272–1290 [A Critical Register of Royal Charters from the House of Árpád, Vol. 2. No. 2–3.] (in Hungarian). Magyar Országos Levéltár.
- Zsoldos, Attila (2005). Az Árpádok és asszonyaik. A királynéi intézmény az Árpádok korában [The Árpáds and their Women: The Institution of Queenship in the Era of the Árpáds] (in Hungarian). MTA Történettudományi Intézete. ISBN 963-8312-98-X.
- Zsoldos, Attila (2011). Magyarország világi archontológiája, 1000–1301 [Secular Archontology of Hungary, 1000–1301] (in Hungarian). História, MTA Történettudományi Intézete. ISBN 978-963-9627-38-3.
- Zsoldos, Attila (2020). The Árpáds and Their People. An Introduction to the History of Hungary from cca. 900 to 1301. Arpadiana IV., Research Centre for the Humanities. ISBN 978-963-416-226-1.

Catholic Church titles
Preceded by Demetrius	Provost of Székesfehérvár (elected); 1277–1278	Succeeded by John Hont-Pázmány (elected)
Preceded by Philip	Bishop of Vác; 1278–1289	Succeeded by Theodore Tengerdi (elected)
Political offices
Preceded by John Hont-Pázmány	Head of the royal chapel 1277	Succeeded by Lucas
Preceded by John Hont-Pázmány	Vice-chancellor; 1277–1278	Succeeded by John Hont-Pázmány
Preceded by Ladislaus	Chancellor of the Queen; 1280–1284	Succeeded by Ladislaus
Preceded by Joachim Gutkeled	Ispán of Pilis; 1281–1284	Succeeded by Eyza
Preceded by John Hont-Pázmány	Chancellor; 1284–1289	Succeeded by Gregory
