= Ágoston Roskoványi =

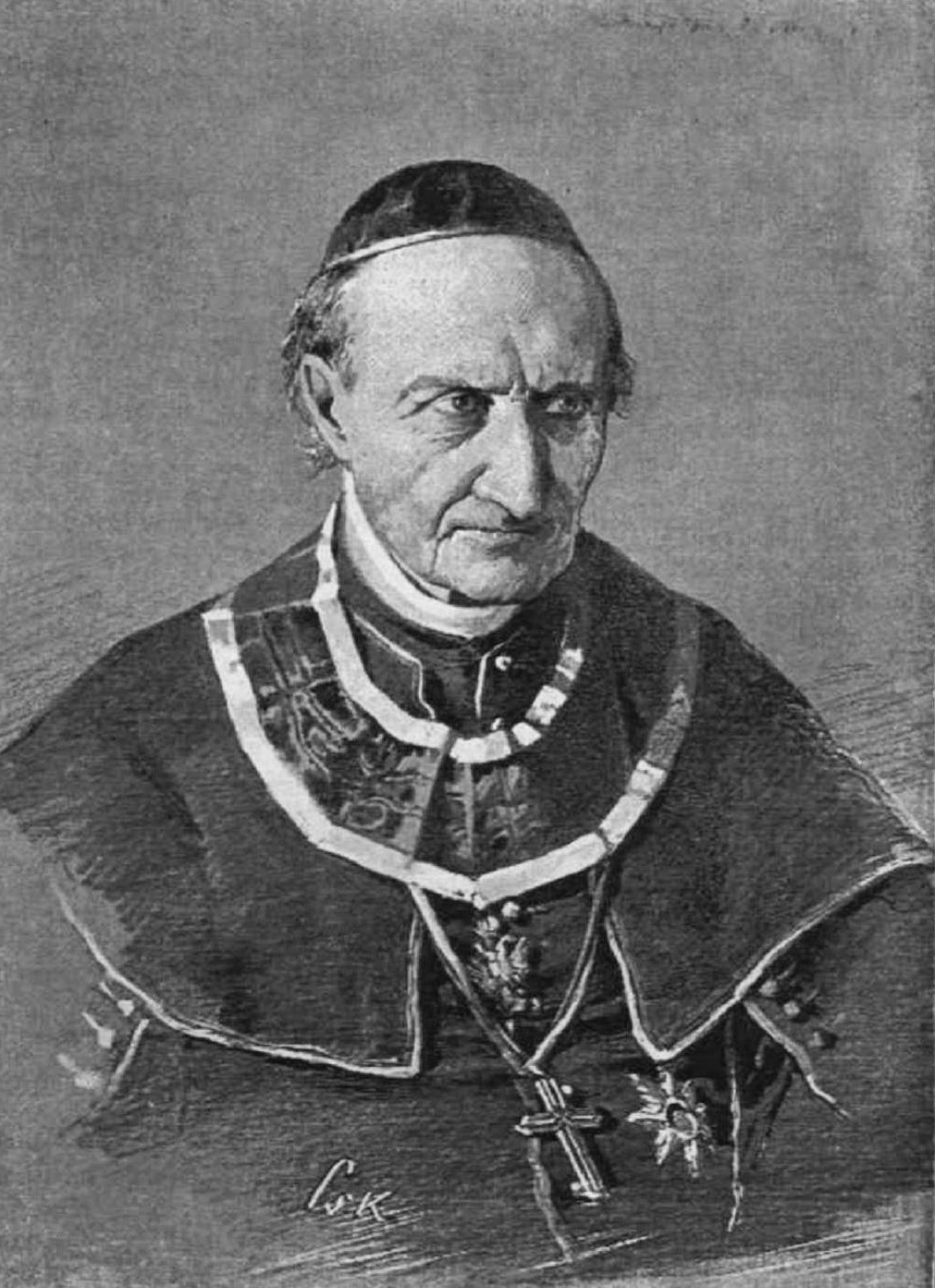
Ágoston Roskoványi

Count Augustinus Roskoványi (7 December 1807 – 24 February 1892) was a Roman Catholic Bishop of Nyitra (in today Nitra, Slovakia) in Hungary, doctor of philosophy and theologian.

== Biography ==
He was born at Szenna in Somogy County, Hungary on 7 December 1807; died on 24 February, 1892. He took his gymnasial course in the college of the Piarists at Kisszeben from 1817 to 1822, studied philosophy at Eger, 1822–24, theology in the seminary for priests at Pest, and completed his training at the Augustineum at Vienna.

After his ordination to the priesthood in 1831 he was shortly engaged in pastoral duties, then went to the seminary at Eger as prefect of studies, became vice-rector of the seminary, and in 1841 rector. In 1836 he was made a cathedral canon of Eger, in 1839 received the Abbey of Saár, in 1847 became auxiliary bishop, in 1850 capitular vicar, in 1851 Bishop of Vác and in 1859 Bishop of Nyitra. Roskoványi was also made a Roman count, prelate and assistant at the papal throne. His charity is shown by the foundations he established, valued at several hundred thousand gulden.

== Works ==
Roskoványi wrote a number of ecclesiastical works, including:

- De primatu Romani Pontificis ejusque juribus (Augsburg, 1839; 2nd ed., Agram, 1841)
- De matrimoniis mixtis (5 volumes, Fünfkirchen, 1842; Pesth, 1854, 1870 1)
- De matrimoniis in ecclesia catholica (2 volumes, Augsburg, 1837–40)
- Monumenta catholica pro independentia potestatis ecclesiasticae ab imperio civili (14 volumes Funfkirchen, 1847; Pesth, 1856, 1865, 1870–71)
- Coelibatus et breviarium, duo gravissima clericorum officia, etc. (7 volumes, Pesth, 1867, 1875)
- Romanus Pontifex tamquam primas ecclesiae, etc. (16 volumes, Neutra and Comaromii, 1867, 1878)
- Beata Virgo Maria in suo conceptu immaculata (12 volumes, Budapest, 1873–4; Neutra 1877)
