= Kvetoslavov =

Kvetoslavov Úszor
- Municipality
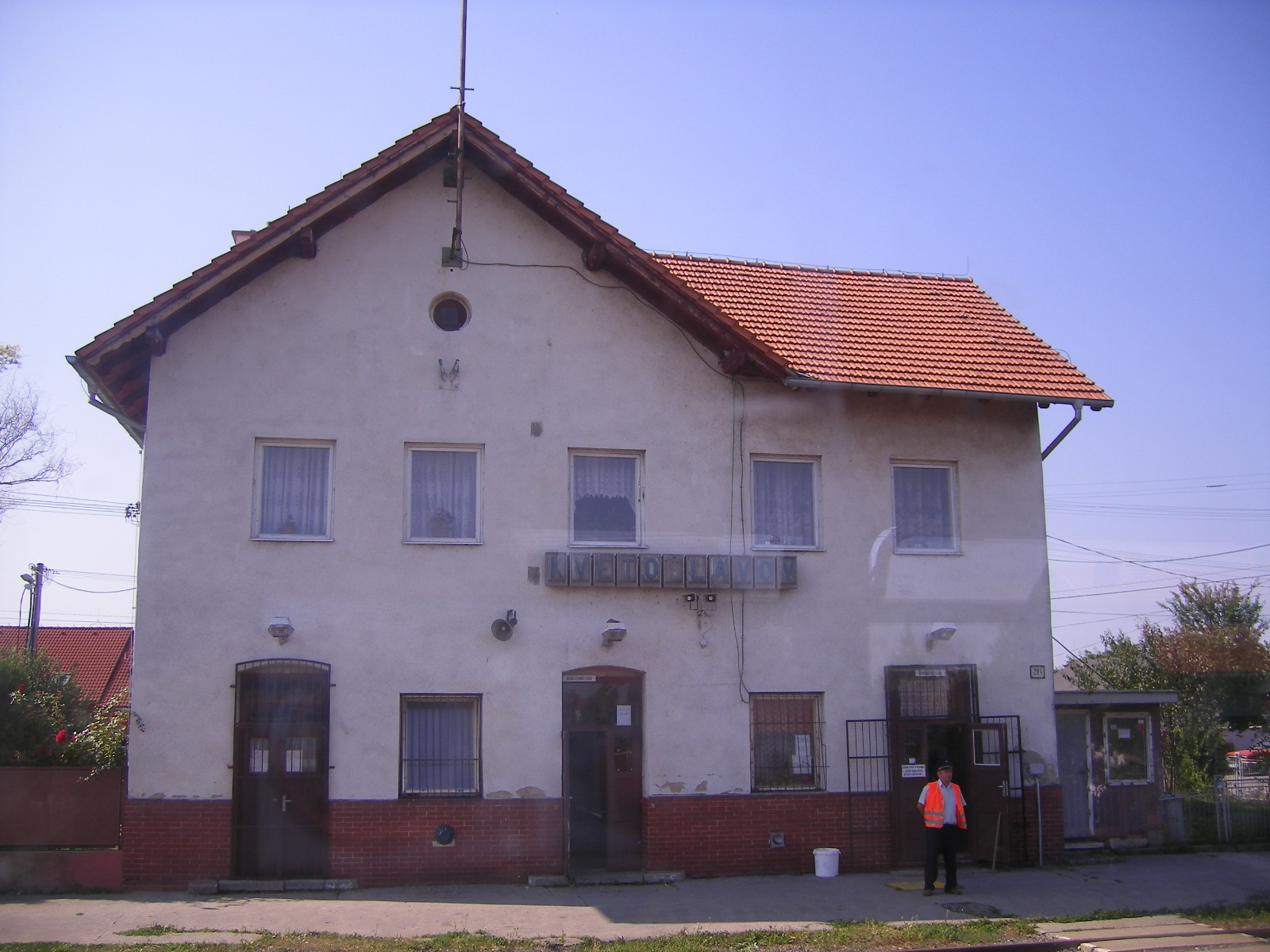

- Flag

- Location of Kvetoslavov in the Trnava Region Location of Kvetoslavov in Slovakia
- Coordinates: 48.06°N 17.34°E
- Country: Slovakia
- Region: Trnava Region
- District: Dunajská Streda District
- First mentioned: 1230

Government
  - Mayor: Soňa Franková (Ind.)

Area
  - Total: 8.09 km^{2} (3.12 sq mi)
- Elevation: 125 m (410 ft)

Population (2025)
  - Total: 2,216

Ethnicity
  - Slovaks: 46,69 %
  - Hungarians: 45,99 %
- Time zone: UTC+1 (CET)
  - Summer (DST): UTC+2 (CEST)
- Postal code: 930 41
- Area code: +421 31
- Vehicle registration plate (until 2022): DS
- Website: www.obeckvetoslavov.sk

Kvetoslavov (Hungarian: Úszor, pronounced [ˈuːsor]) is a village and municipality in the Dunajská Streda District in the Trnava Region of south-west Slovakia.

== Geography ==
The municipality lies at an altitude of 125 metres (410 ft) and covers an area of 8.09 km^{2} (3.12 sq mi) (2025).

== History ==
In historical records, the village was first recorded in 1230 as "Vzor".

Until the end of World War I, it was part of Hungary and fell within the Somorja district of Pozsony County. After the Austro-Hungarian army disintegrated in November 1918, Czechoslovak troops occupied the area. After the Treaty of Trianon of 1920, the village became officially part of Czechoslovakia. In November 1938, the First Vienna Award granted the area to Hungary and it was held by Hungary until 1945. After Soviet occupation in 1945, Czechoslovak administration returned and the village became officially part of Czechoslovakia in 1947.

As a part of a forced population exchange initiated by Czechoslovakia, approximately one third of the village’s Hungarian population was expelled to Hungary by Czechoslovak authorities and were replaced by ethnic Slovaks from southern-Hungary.

== Population ==
Population statistic (10 years)
Year	1995	2005	2015	2025
Count	754	862	1207	2216
Difference		+14.32%	+40.02%	+83.59%

Population statistic
Year	2024	2025
Count	2110	2216
Difference		+5.02%

It has a population of 2216 people (31 December 2025).

=== Ethnicity ===
Census 2021 (1+ %)
Ethnicity	Number	Fraction
Slovak	1408	80.73%
Hungarian	291	16.68%
Czech	47	2.69%
Not found out	47	2.69%
Total	1744	

In year 2021 was 1744 people by ethnicity 1408 as Slovak, 291 as Hungarian, 47 as Czech, 47 as Not found out, 10 as Russian, 9 as Ukrainian, 9 as Other, 8 as Rusyn, 4 as Bulgarian, 3 as Jewish, 3 as Italian, 3 as Romani, 2 as German, 1 as Turkish, 1 as Polish, 1 as Greek, 1 as Croatian and 1 as Albanian.

Note on population: The difference values of population numbers in the table "Population statistic" and in the sections "Ethnicity" & "Religion" is caused by the use of various statistical methods.

=== Religion ===
Census 2021 (1+ %)
Religion	Number	Fraction
Roman Catholic Church	755	43.29%
None	745	42.72%
Evangelical Church	75	4.3%
Not found out	51	2.92%
Greek Catholic Church	37	2.12%
Total	1744	

In year 2021 was 1744 people by religion 755 from Roman Catholic Church, 745 from None, 75 from Evangelical Church, 51 from Not found out, 37 from Greek Catholic Church, 13 from Calvinist Church, 12 from Baptists Church, 11 from Other, 11 from Ad hoc movements, 8 from Other and not ascertained christian church, 6 from United Methodist Church, 5 from Paganism and natural spirituality, 5 from Apostolic Church, 3 from Jewish community, 3 from Christian Congregations in Slovakia, 2 from Buddhism, 1 from Eastern Orthodox Church and 1 from Jehovah's Witnesses.

1379 people (79.1%) of Slovak nationality, 265 people (15.2%) Hungarians and 43 (2.5%), other nationality.

There were 262 people according to the 1910 census. In 2001 – 822 people and at the end of 2008 estimate by the Statistical Office had the village's population at 932 people. Roman Catholicism is the major religion of the village, its adherents numbering at 85.30% of the total population.

== Transport ==
Kvetoslavov lies on railway number 131 connecting Bratislava with Komárno. Newly built speedway R7 runs just outside of the village where interchange is only kilometer away.

Airport Kvetoslavov is also located in the village.
