= Vác Cathedral =

Coordinates: 47.7759°N 19.1314°E

Assumption Cathedral
- Nagyboldogasszony székesegyház
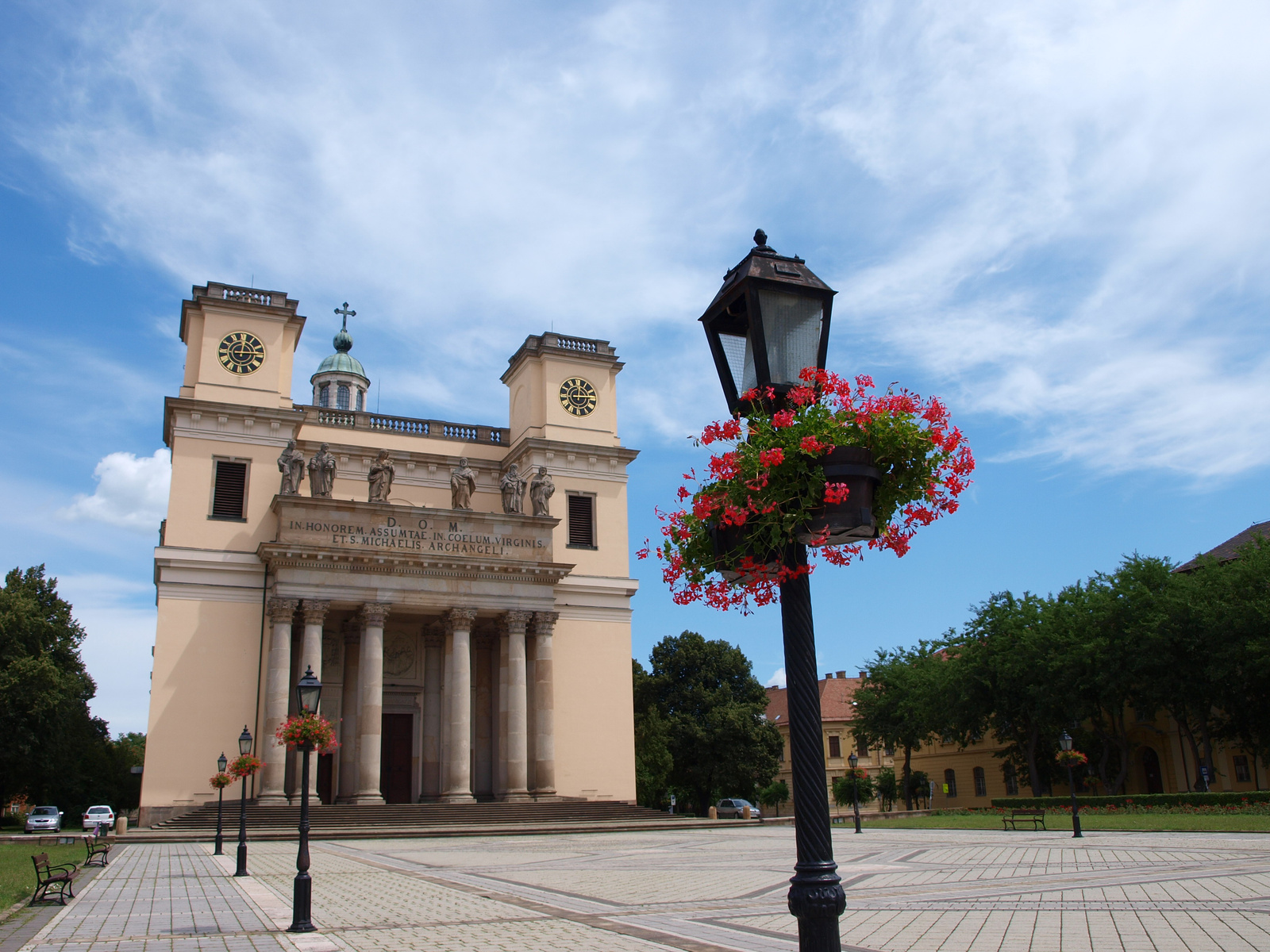
- Assumption Cathedral
- Location: Vác
- Country: Hungary
- Denomination: Roman Catholic Church

The Cathedral of the Assumption of the Blessed Virgin and St Michael the Archangel (Hungarian: Nagyboldogasszony székesegyház), commonly known as Vác Cathedral, is a religious building in the Catholic Church that serves as the cathedral of the Diocese of Vác. It is located in the city of Vác in Hungary.

The diocese was founded in 1004 under Stephen I. The present church is the fifth structure on this site. The first cathedral was built in 1074, at the same site of the present, but was destroyed in the fourteenth century, during the invasions of the Mongols. During the Ottoman occupation of Hungary the last remnants of the wall collapsed. Some of the residue is still visible today. Only after the departure of the Ottomans was it possible to build a new church.

Construction work began in 1761. Already in 1772 the cathedral was consecrated. The work continued until its completion in 1777. In 1944 during World War II a Soviet bomb hit the dome without actually detonating so a cool church parishioners remember what considered a "miracle".

== See also ==
- Roman Catholicism in Hungary
- List of cathedrals in Hungary

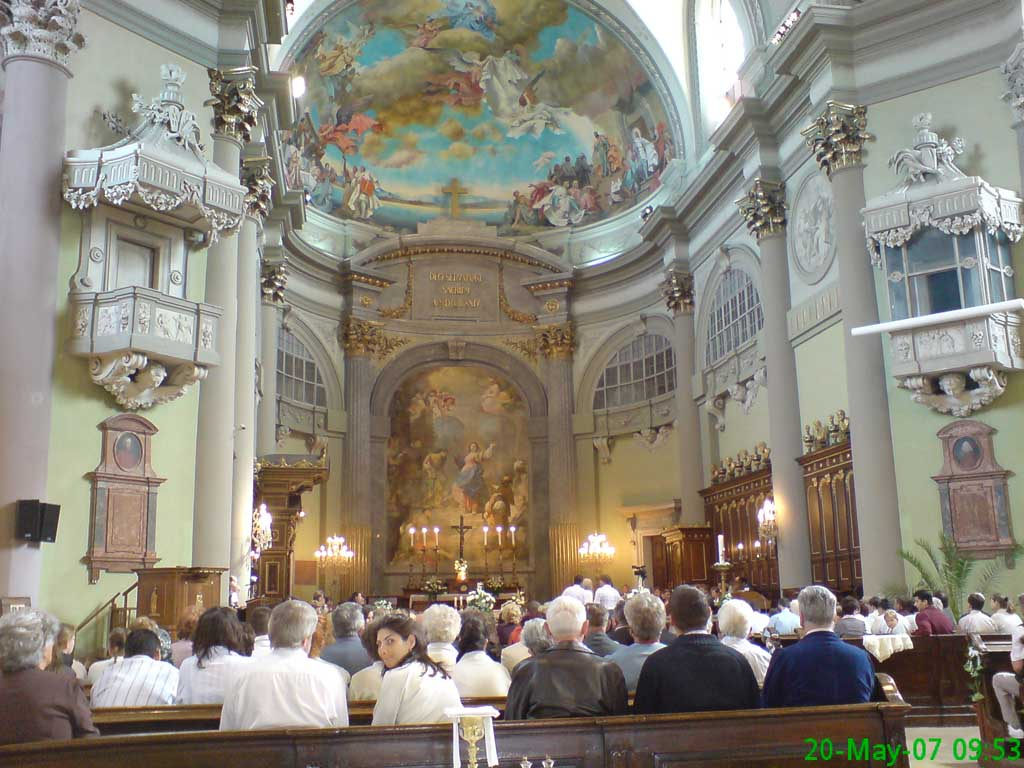
Internal view
