= Dömös Chapter =

Collegiate chapter during the Kingdom of Hungary

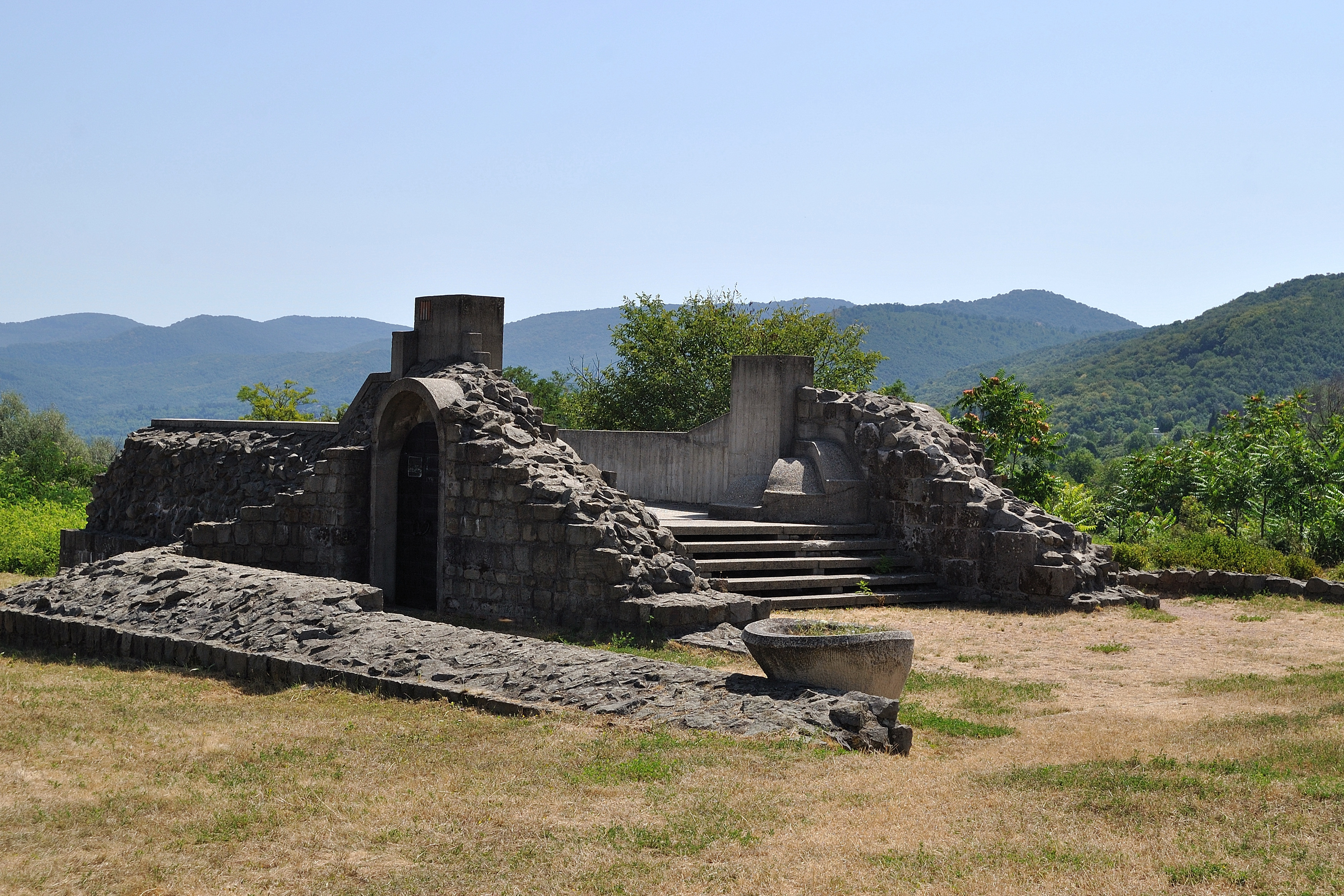
The ruins of the Dömös Chapter at Dömös (Hungary)

The Dömös Chapter was a collegiate chapter, established around 1107, in the Kingdom of Hungary. It was dedicated to Saint Margaret of Antioch.

== Establishment ==
Duke Álmos – the younger brother of Coloman the Learned, King of Hungary – established the collegiate chapter at Dömös around 1107. According to historian György Györffy, the duke set up the chapter after he returned from his pilgrimage in the Holy Land, taking a relic of Saint Margaret of Antioch with him. Scholar László Koszta writes that Duke Álmos had established the chapter, dedicated to Saint Margaret, before he departed for the pilgrimage.

== Sources ==
- Koszta, László (1994). "Dömös". In Kristó, Gyula; Engel, Pál; Makk, Ferenc (eds.). Korai magyar történeti lexikon (9–14. század) [Encyclopedia of the Early Hungarian History (9th–14th centuries)] (in Hungarian). Akadémiai Kiadó. pp. 172–173. ISBN 963-05-6722-9.
- Györffy, György (1998). Az Árpád-kori Magyarország történeti földrajza, IV: Liptó, Máramaros, Moson, Nagysziged, Nógrád, Nyitra, Pest és Pilis megye [Historical Geography of Hungary of the Árpáds, Volume I: The Counties of Liptó, Máramaros, Moson, Nagysziged, Nógrád, Nyitra, Pest és Pilis] (in Hungarian). Akadémiai Kiadó. ISBN 963-05-7504-3.
- Kiss, Gergely (2013). Királyi egyházak a középkori Magyarországon [Royal Churches in Medieval Hungary] (in Hungarian). Pécsi Történettudományért Kulturális Egyesület. ISBN 978-963-642-442-8.
- Thoroczkay, Gábor (2012). "A dömösi prépostság története alapításától I. Károly uralkodásának végéig [The History of the Provostry of Dömös from Its Foundation Until the End of the Reign of Charles I]". Fons (in Hungarian). 19 (4). Szentpétery Imre Történettudományi Alapítvány: 409–433. ISSN 1217-8020.
