= Benedict III =

Benedict III may refer to:

- Benedict III (archbishop of Esztergom) (died 1276)
- Pope Benedict III (died 858), Pope of the Catholic Church
