= Peter Kőszegi =

Hungarian bishop

- Bishop of Veszprém
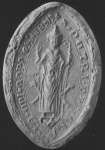
- Seal of Peter Kőszegi
- Installed: 1275
- Term ended: 1289
- Predecessor: Paul Balog
- Successor: Benedict Rád

Personal details
- Died: May 1289 Veszprém, Hungary
- Denomination: Roman Catholic
- Parents: Henry I Kőszegi

Peter Kőszegi (Hungarian: Kőszegi Péter; killed May 1289) was a Hungarian prelate in the 13th century, who served as Bishop of Veszprém from 1275 until his death. He was also unrecognized Archbishop-elect of Esztergom between 1277 and 1278. As a member of the powerful Kőszegi family, he subordinated his diocese to his family's political interests in order to extend their influence over Western Hungary.

== Background ==
Peter was born in the second half of the 1240s into the influential and wealthy Kőszegi family, as one of the four sons of the powerful lord Henry I Kőszegi. His three brothers – Nicholas I, Ivan and the much younger Henry II – were elevated into high dignities during the age of the late Árpáds.

When the minor Ladislaus IV of Hungary ascended the Hungarian throne in 1272, the kingdom fell into anarchy and many groupings of barons fought against each other for supreme power. Peter's father Henry was one of the key figures in that period, who entered alliance with the Gutkeleds and the Geregyes, forming one of the two main baronial groups, while the other one was dominated by the Csák and Monoszló clans. Henry was killed in the Battle of Föveny in late September 1274; thereafter his enemy Peter Csák gathered an army and marched into Western Hungary against the Kőszegis' domain in the autumn of 1274, but he couldn't break they power once and for all.

== Episcopal career ==
It is possible he is identical with that Peter, who served as provost of the collegiate chapter of Vasvár in 1274. Peter first appeared in contemporary records in May 1275, when he was elected Bishop of Veszprém. Pope Gregory X confirmed his election sometime before June 1275. Prior to that, his family had no interests in Veszprém County, but the Ugod branch of the Csák kindred possessed landholdings and castles in the region. Peter's election occurred under political pressure, when the Kőszegis regained their influence in the royal council by mid-1275. Under such circumstances, the town of Veszprém and the surrounding lands became a buffer zone between the two rivaling families, the Kőszegis and the Csáks. In early 1276, Peter Csák and his allies launched a massive military campaign against the Kőszegi and Gutkeled dominions. Their troops plundered and devastated the territory of the Diocese of Veszprém. During the attack, 68 canons, priests and clergymen were killed, several others were tortured and robbed, while all the treasures of the Veszprém cathedral chapter, including the library and archives of its school were looted and burnt. The canonical university was never rebuilt after Peter Csák's campaign. According to contemporary records, this was "the worst barbaric and most destructive attack" in Hungary since the Mongol invasion. Despite that, Peter Kőszegi retained his position, and stayed in the royal court at the end of July 1276. To compensate for destroyed church property, King Ladislaus, his mother Queen Elizabeth the Cuman and his consort Queen Isabella of Sicily made several donations to the Diocese of Veszprém in the following months.

Beside his bishopric, Peter was also styled traditionally as chancellor of Queen Isabella in 1277, and later from 1284 to 1285 (or possibly till his death in 1289). In this capacity, Peter handed over his village Szentbékkálla to the cathedral chapter in exchange for the settlements Aracs (today a borough of Balatonfüred), Örményes and Udvari in April 1277. Sometime later in that year (before November), he was dismissed as queenly chancellor. Peter returned the tithe of Paloznak to the chapter in August 1277, he is not styled as chancellor in the document. It is plausible, he lost his office because of his involvement in his family's rebellion against Ladislaus IV at the turn of 1277 and 1278. The Kőszegis even invited the king's distant relative Andrew the Venetian to the Hungarian throne in 1278. The self-styled Duke of Slavonia confirmed the privileges of the cathedral chapter of Veszprém upon Peter's request during his stay in Kehida in May 1278. Peter confirmed the collection right of tithe for the monastery of nuns located in the valley of Veszprém in February 1279, upon the request of abbess Agnes. He donated his palace at Veszprém to archdeacon Colynus for lifelong use in April 1279.

Following the death of Archbishop-elect Benedict, some canons of the cathedral chapter of Esztergom elected Peter Kőszegi as his successor on 13 March 1277. Beyond his brothers and their allies, neither Ladislaus IV nor the other baronial groups acknowledged the process, while Nicholas Kán (King Ladislaus' confidant) also contested the election, referring to his status of archbishop-elect from the previous years. In order to solve the situation, Pope John XXI summoned both prelates to Rome, but they refused to attend. Soon, Pope John died on 20 May 1277, and Pope Nicholas III succeeded him after a six-month vacancy. The new pope summoned both Nicholas Kán and Peter Kőszegi to the Roman Curia on 27 January 1278. Peter Kőszegi refused to travel personally, but sent his protege Paul Balog in order to receive papal support for his case. On 1 June 1278, Pope Nicholas declared the see of Esztergom vacant and ordered a new election. Thereafter, Pope Nicholas III appointed Lodomer as the new Archbishop of Esztergom on 13 June 1279, ending a seven-year period of vacancy. After Ladislaus reconciled with the Kőszegis in March 1279 upon the mediation of papal legate Philip of Fermo, Peter joined the entourage of the papal legate, along with the other prelates of the realm. To increase his wealth and dominance, Peter also unlawfully usurped the tithe from the monastery of nuns located in the valley of Veszprém, despite his former promise. As a result, Agnes petitioned to the court of papal legate Philip, who ruled in favor of the monastery and rebuked Peter Kőszegi.

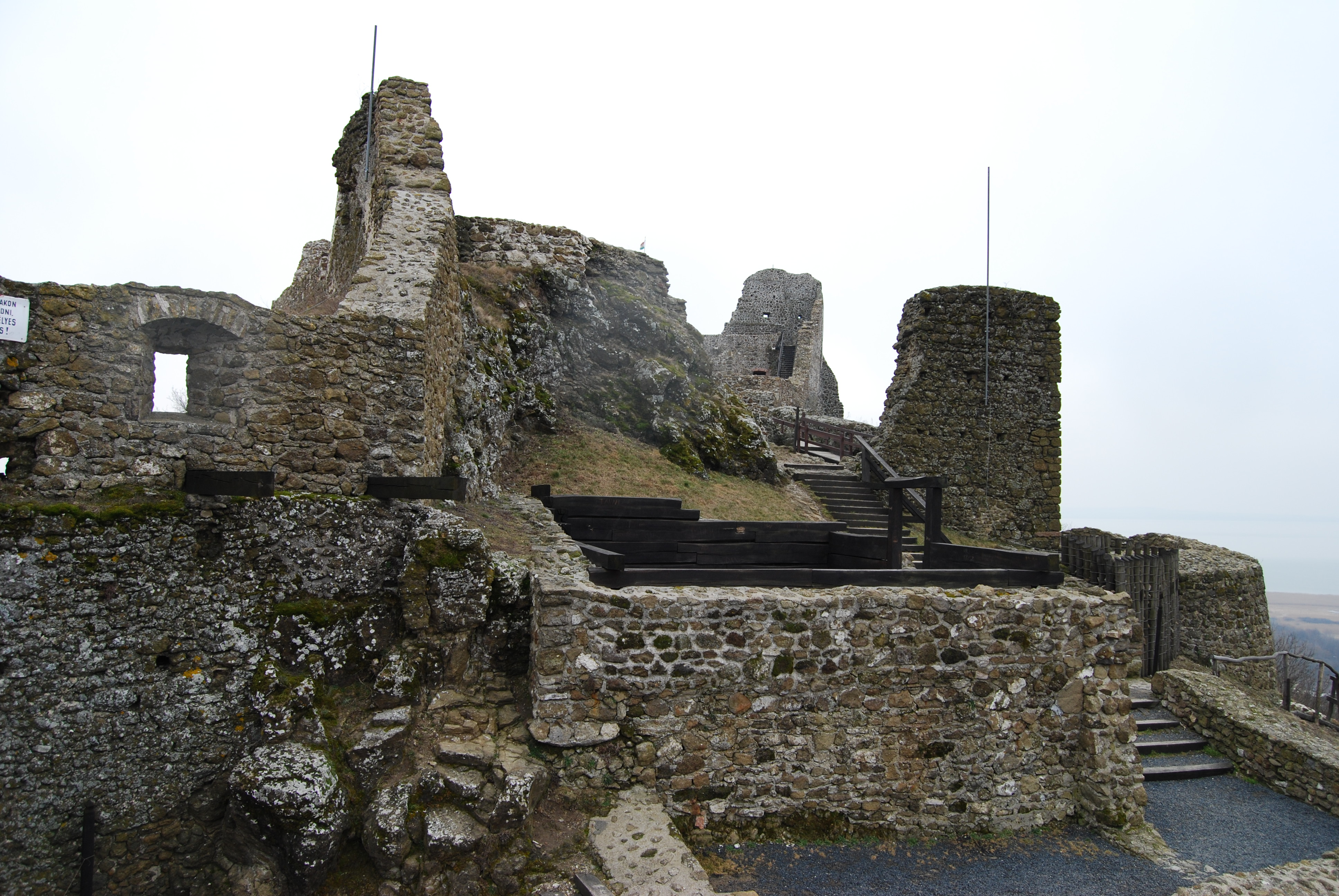
The ruins of the fort of Szigliget

On 21 May 1280, Peter Kőszegi excommunicated Nicholas Pok and his three brothers, who had participated in Peter Csák's looting raids against the Diocese of Veszprém. In the upcoming years, the Pok brothers continued to plunder the Transdanubian estates of the bishopric, for instance they attacked and ravaged the church property in Tapolca, Csököly and Görgeteg around 1278, while also devastated the episcopal village Hegymagas in Zala County, slaughtering the local population. In retaliation, besides the punishment of excommunication, Peter Kőszegi's troops raided the family monastery of the Pok clan in the namesake village near Győr. He ordered to transfer its treasury, relics and jewelry to St. Michael's Cathedral of Veszprém. In 1285, he personally led his episcopal army in the siege of the castle of Szigliget, also owned by the Pok kindred. There, he confiscated the seized religious relics and values, including chasubles, books and gems for his diocese. Some historians connect and merge the two events, and consider the treasury of the Pok monastery were transferred to Szigliget Castle sometime after the Mongol invasion. Peter was present in October 1280 at Ozalj Castle along the river Kupa, when his brothers Nicholas, who was made Ban of Slavonia in that time, and Ivan concluded peace with their local enemies, the Babonići and Frankopans.

During his episcopate, Peter Kőszegi subordinated his diocese and its resources to his family's political interests in order to extend their influence over Western Hungary. During the royal campaign against Ivan Kőszegi at the turn of 1283 and 1284, Peter provided help to his brother and sent his episcopal banderium. Nicholas, Henry, and – despite his clerical position – Bishop Peter stormed into Southern Transdanubia and jointly invaded and besieged the episcopal town of Pécs in March 1284. When Albert I, Duke of Austria led a military campaign against Ivan Kőszegi, who constantly pillaged the Austrian and Styrian lands from his province, his army intended to besiege Borostyánkő (present-day Bernstein, Austria) in 1285, but Ivan asked for help from his three brothers, including Peter, who recruited an army of 1,000 people. The brothers jointly routed Albert's army. Around 1288, Rudolf of Hoheneck, the Archbishop of Salzburg promised Peter and Ivan that he was willing to offer assistance them against Duke Albert, and without their knowledge he will not reconcile with the members of the House of Habsburg. Peter Kőszegi and John Hont-Pázmány, Archbishop of Kalocsa stayed in Dióslápa (present-day Szentgáloskér) in Somogy County in August 1288, possibly as members of an ad hoc court. In response to Ivan's incursions, Duke Albert launched a massive royal campaign ("Güssing Feud"; German: Güssinger Fehde) with his 15,000-size army against the Kőszegis and their familiares' castles and forts in the spring of 1289. Ivan Kőszegi again sought assistance from his brothers, because the Austrians captured at least 30 fortresses and settlements along the western borders within weeks. Peter Kőszegi tried to gather a relief army to recapture Rohonc (Rechnitz). Therefore, he convened an assembly of his familiares in his diocese in May 1289, possibly in the seat Veszprém. However the Transdanubian lords were hesitant to participate in a private war against Duke Albert, rejecting the bishop's personal and family interests. During the emerging dispute, an offended noble stabbed and killed Peter Kőszegi with his sword, according to the narration of the Austrian chronicle Continuatio Vindobonensis.

== Sources ==
- Beke, Margit (2003). "Kán nembeli II. Miklós [Nicholas II from the kindred Kán]". In Beke, Margit (ed.). Esztergomi érsekek 1001–2003 [Archbishops of Esztergom 1001–2003] (in Hungarian). Szent István Társulat. pp. 121–125. ISBN 963-361-472-4.
- Gutheil, Jenő (2008). Az Árpád-kori Veszprém [Veszprém During the Age of Árpáds] (in Hungarian). Lichtneckert, András. ISBN 978-963-06-5550-7.
- Kádár, Tamás (2021). "Püspökgyilkosság Veszprémben. Kőszegi (II.) Péter veszprémi püspök pályája [Murder of a Bishop in Veszprém. The Career of Peter (II) Kőszegi, Bishop of Veszprém]". Veszprémi Szemle (in Hungarian). 23 (4). Veszprémi Szemle Várostörténeti Közhasznú Alapítvány: 16–38. ISSN 1217-5358.
- Szűcs, Jenő (2002). Az utolsó Árpádok [The Last Árpáds] (in Hungarian). Osiris Kiadó. ISBN 963-389-271-6.
- Varga, Béla (2009). Veszprém város lexikona [A Lexicon of the City of Veszprém] (in Hungarian). ISBN 978-963-06-7941-1.
- Zsoldos, Attila (2011). Magyarország világi archontológiája, 1000–1301 [Secular Archontology of Hungary, 1000–1301] (in Hungarian). História, MTA Történettudományi Intézete. ISBN 978-963-9627-38-3.

Peter House of Kőszegi Born: ? Died: May 1289
Catholic Church titles
| Preceded by Paul Balog | Bishop of Veszprém; 1275–1289 | Succeeded by Benedict Rád |
| Preceded by Benedict (elected) | Archbishop of Esztergom (elected, contested by Nicholas Kán); 1277–1278 | Succeeded by Lodomer |
Political offices
| Preceded by Philip | Chancellor of the Queen; 1277 | Succeeded by Ladislaus |
| Preceded by Ladislaus | Chancellor of the Queen; 1284–1285 (or 1289) | Succeeded by Benedict Rád |
