= Nicholas Kán =

Hungarian prelate

- Archbishop-elect of Esztergom
- Installed: 1273; 1276
- Term ended: 1273; 1278
- Predecessor: Philip Türje (1st); Benedict (2nd)
- Successor: Benedict (1st); Lodomer (2nd)
- Other post: Provost of Transylvania

Personal details
- Died: December 1279
- Denomination: Roman Catholic
- Parents: Ladislaus I Kán

Nicholas from the kindred Kán (Hungarian: Kán nembeli Miklós; died December 1279) was a Hungarian prelate in the second half of the 13th century, who served as Archbishop-elect of Esztergom in 1273, and from 1276 until 1278. Simultaneously, he held various posts in the royal chancellery. As a loyal partisan of queen regent Elizabeth, he was an active participant in the feudal anarchy, when groupings of barons fought against each other for supreme power during the minority of king Ladislaus IV. For which, papal legate Philip of Fermo excommunicated him.

== Early life ==
Nicholas was born into the Transylvanian branch of the gens (clan) Kán, as the son of Ladislaus I Kán, Palatine of Hungary and unidentified noblewoman. His grandfather was Julius I Kán, the founder of the branch. Nicholas had two brothers, Ladislaus II, who functioned as Voivode of Transylvania and Judge royal twice, and Julius III, who possibly was killed in the 1260s civil war. Nicholas also had a sister, name unknown, who married Alexander Aba. They were the parents of Demetrius Nekcsei and ancestors of the Nekcsei family.

In contemporary records, his name is referred to with the honorary title of "magister", demonstrating his education and skills in science. By the early 1260s, he joined the court of the king's eldest son Duke Stephen, who governed Transylvania and adopted the title of junior king. Stephen's relationship with his father Béla IV deteriorated by the early 1260s. While Nicholas' brothers Ladislaus and Julius betrayed Stephen and defected to the royal court in 1264, Nicholas remained loyal to the duke, even after the emerging civil war between father and son. For his service, Duke Stephen appointed him provost of Transylvania in 1265, holding the office until 1276. In the next year, when Smaragd of Kalocsa died, Nicholas succeeded him as chancellor of Stephen's court. He issued two royal charters in this capacity. However, as a royal charter issued in 1267 narrates, Nicholas soon left Stephen's province to join Béla's partisans. Although confidence was never restored between Béla and Stephen, the political situation has stabilized by the last regnal years of the old monarch. Soon, Nicholas became a confidant of Stephen's spouse, Queen Elizabeth the Cuman. In 1272, he is referred to as her vice-chancellor, but it is possible that he already held the office under the direction of chancellor Philip, Bishop of Vác in the queenly court since 1270, when Stephen V ascended the Hungarian throne.

== In the feudal anarchy ==
When the minor Ladislaus IV was crowned king in Székesfehérvár around September 1272. In theory, the 10-year-old Ladislaus ruled under his mother's regency, but in fact, baronial parties administered the kingdom. As a supporter of queen dowager Elizabeth, Nicholas Kán became vice-chancellor of the royal court, held the position until February 1273. Meanwhile, the episcopal see of Esztergom remained vacant after the death of Archbishop Philip Türje in late 1272. Elizabeth was trying to achieve the election of her protege with all the means. When the cathedral chapter of Esztergom convened between 12 February and 1 March, Nicholas Kán's army surrounded the building, locked the canons and deprived them of food and water with the tacit consent of Elizabeth. Under such conditions, the intimidated canons elected Nicholas as Archbishop of Esztergom. Additionally, he also became royal chancellor and ispán (count) of Pilis County for a short time in May 1273, when Queen Elizabeth temporarily regained her lost influence over the royal council due to the Bohemian invasion. However Pope Gregory X and most of the later liberated canons refused to acknowledge the validity and legality of his election. When the Kőszegi family and their allies deprived Elizabeth and his courtiers from the power in June 1273, they declared the episcopal see as sede vacante again. As Elizabeth never regained her central position and decayed into nominal regency, Nicholas Kán lost his political influence for years. The canons of Esztergom elected Benedict as the new archbishop in February 1274, who held the dignity until his death in November 1276. According to historian Sándor Hunyadi, Benedict was already elected in February or March 1273, but Nicholas Kán usurped his position by force (see above). Thereafter, both prelates claimed the dignity for themselves simultaneously.

Nicholas arbitrarily adopted the title of archbishop and vice-chancellor already in December 1276. However, some canons nominated Peter Kőszegi, an influential member of the rival baronial group to the position in March 1277. Pope John XXI summoned Nicholas to Rome per Lodomer, Bishop of Várad (today Oradea, Romania) the same month, but Nicholas refused to attend. After conducting an investigation, Pope John listed Nicholas' crimes in his letter in 1277. Accordingly, "the canons of Esztergom elected him as archbishop under the influence of threats, he kept them locked up in the cathedral all day, hungry and thirsty. In 6 years, he did not appear in Rome for a single summons. His violence manifested itself in several areas. He was accused of looting, arson, murder, and lack of education". Pope John died on 20 May 1277, and Pope Nicholas III succeeded him after a six-month vacancy. Nicholas retained his virtual position and became chancellor again. Nicholas participated in the general assembly at Rákos in May 1277, which declared Ladislaus to be of age. Later Stephen Báncsa, Archbishop of Kalocsa, who acted as de facto head of the Catholic Church in Hungary, summoned an ecclesiastic congregatio in Buda and excommunicated the leaders of the Saxon rebellion, which devastated the province of Transylvania. Ladislaus IV commissioned Nicholas Kán, who gained significant room for maneuver against Peter Kőszegi in these months, to lead a royal punitive expedition against the Saxons in Szeben region in 1278, in the same time with the defeat of the Geregye dominion in Tiszántúl, while the king launched a massive royal campaign against the Kőszegis in Transdanubia at the same time. Nicholas' army captured the rebellious Nicholas Geregye's fortress at Adorján (now Adrian in Romania) in the first half of 1278, and marched into Transylvania, where defeated the Saxon rebels by early summer.

Pope Nicholas III summoned both Nicholas Kán and Peter Kőszegi to the Roman Curia on 27 January 1278. Nicholas refused to travel personally to Rome citing the journey as risky and referred to the peace to be concluded between Ottokar II of Bohemia and Ladislaus IV, but sent his emissaries, priest Karacin, archdeacon Benedict of Békés and cleric Nicholas. The list of his insignificant emissaries proves that the majority of the cathedral chapter of Esztergom supported Peter's candidacy. On 1 June 1278, Pope Nicholas decided not to confirm either nomination, instead, he wished to appoint the archbishop himself in accordance with the canon law. The vacancy of the episcopal see was declared again. The pope called Nicholas as a "reckless man, who burnt churches, ousted and looted the canons, appropriated the seal of the cathedral chapter in a guilty way, and, in fact, he never asked for confirmation of his election". It is possible that the pope also excommunicated him for the first time somewhat later. Nicholas ignored the pope's decision and continued to style himself as archbishop-elect. He again served as vice-chancellor, holding the position until his death. Beside that, he was also styled as provost-elect of Székesfehérvár from November 1278 to March 1279.

Meanwhile, Pope Nicholas sent Philip, Bishop of Fermo, to Hungary to help Ladislaus IV restore royal power and to fill the position of Archbishop of Esztergom. The papal legate arrived in Hungary in early 1279. Philip was willing to release Nicholas from the excommunication in May 1279, if he resign from the title, return the usurped lands and treasures, and leave Hungary for a pilgrimage to Rome. Pope Nicholas III appointed Lodomer as the new Archbishop of Esztergom on 13 June 1279. Philip of Fermo convened a synod in Buda on 14 September 1279, where adopted the so-called Cuman laws. In October, he excommunicated both Ladislaus IV and his ally, Nicholas Kán, and placed Hungary under interdict. During the confrontation between Ladislaus and Philip, the Hungarian king fled the capital for Semlak in Temes County (Tiszántúl) and settled among the Cumans. Two clerics, Nicholas Kán and Gregory, the Grand Provost of Esztergom joined him (the latter was murdered there soon). Around 9 December 1279, Nicholas fell ill. Feeling of impending death, he confessed his sins and requested his family to take his corpse before the papal legate. After his death, Philip ordered to bury him in the cemetery of the lepers in Buda, as his excommunication had not been released. The news spread that whoever is throwing a stone to the corpse, will receive forgiveness, thus his dead body, which laid in the still uncovered grave, was stoned by the mob just before the sepulture. According to a contemporary report, "in a short time, above the body, there was a set of stones that exceeded the height of a house". Some historians argue, when Ladislaus seized and imprisoned Philip of Fermo in early January 1280, one of his main motivations was the desecration of his loyal prelate's grave.

== Sources ==
- Beke, Margit (2003). "Kán nembeli II. Miklós [Nicholas II from the kindred Kán]". In Beke, Margit (ed.). Esztergomi érsekek 1001–2003 [Archbishops of Esztergom 1001–2003] (in Hungarian). Szent István Társulat. pp. 121–125. ISBN 963-361-472-4.
- Hunyadi, Sándor (2022). "Választott esztergomi érsekek az 1270-es években: Benedek és Kán nembeli Miklós [The elected archbishops of Esztergom in the 1270s: Benedek and Nicholas of the Kán kindred]". Belvedere Meridionale (in Hungarian). 34 (4): 5–17. doi:10.14232/belv.2022.4.1. hdl:10831/112912. ISSN 1419-0222.
- Kertész, Balázs (2022). A székesfehérvári káptalan archontológiája és oklevéladó tevékenysége az Árpád-korban [The Archontology and Diploma Issuing Activity of the Chapter of Székesfehérvár in the Age of Árpáds] (in Hungarian). Városi Levéltár és Kutatóintézet. ISBN 978-963-8406-27-9.
- Markó, László (2006). A magyar állam főméltóságai Szent Istvántól napjainkig: Életrajzi Lexikon [Great Officers of State in Hungary from King Saint Stephen to Our Days: A Biographical Encyclopedia] (in Hungarian). Helikon Kiadó. ISBN 963-208-970-7.
- Zsoldos, Attila (2007). Családi ügy: IV. Béla és István ifjabb király viszálya az 1260-as években [A family affair: The Conflict between Béla IV and Junior King Stephen in the 1260s] (in Hungarian). História, MTA Történettudományi Intézete. ISBN 978-963-9627-15-4.
- Zsoldos, Attila (2011). Magyarország világi archontológiája, 1000–1301 [Secular Archontology of Hungary, 1000–1301] (in Hungarian). História, MTA Történettudományi Intézete. ISBN 978-963-9627-38-3.

Nicholas Genus Kán Born: ? Died: December 1279
Political offices
Preceded by Smaragd	Chancellor of the Junior King; 1266	Succeeded by Stephen Báncsa
Preceded by Benedict	Vice-chancellor; 1272–1273	Succeeded by Benedict
Preceded by Paul Balog	Chancellor; 1273	Succeeded by Paul Balog
Preceded by Benedict	Vice-chancellor; 1276	Succeeded by Demetrius
Preceded by Job Záh	Chancellor; 1277–1278	Succeeded by Job Záh
Preceded by John Hont-Pázmány	Vice-chancellor; 1278–1279	Succeeded by Acho
Catholic Church titles
Preceded by Philip Türje	Archbishop of Esztergom (elected); 1273	Succeeded by Benedict (elected)
Preceded by Benedict (elected)	Archbishop of Esztergom (elected, contested by Peter Kőszegi); 1276–1278	Succeeded by Lodomer
Preceded by John Hont-Pázmány (elected)	Provost of Székesfehérvár (elected); 1278–1279	Succeeded by Anthony
