= Paul Balog (bishop of Veszprém) =

Hungarian bishop

- Bishop of Veszprém
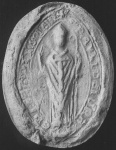
- Seal of Paul Balog, 1272
- Installed: 1263
- Term ended: 1275
- Predecessor: Zlaudus Ják
- Successor: Peter Kőszegi
- Other post: Provost-elect of Fehérvár

Personal details
- Died: January/March 1275
- Denomination: Roman Catholic

Paul from the kindred Balog (Hungarian: Balog nembeli Pál; died between January and March 1275) was a Hungarian prelate in the 13th century, who served as Bishop of Veszprém from 1263 until his death. Simultaneously, he also held various positions in the royal court.

== Ancestry ==
Paul was born around 1227. His parentage is unknown. He had two brothers, including Benedict, who served as ispán of Veszprém County in 1269. He was called Benedict of Árma in 1266, after his ownership of a village in Bars County (present-day an uninhabited waste in Málaš, Slovakia). Paul's another, unidentified brother was the father of his namesake nephew, who was elevated into the dignity of Bishop of Pécs at the turn of the 13th and 14th centuries. Benedict had two sons, Michael and Paul.

Several historians consider that Paul and his family belonged to the Szécsi branch of the gens (clan) Balog, based on the 15th-century Pauline friar Gergely Gyöngyösi's Vitae fratrum Eremitarum Ordinis Sancti Pauli Primi Eremitae, but it is not without doubt. Historian Gyula Pauler claimed Paul originated from the clan Tétény, but his contemporary, genealogist János Karácsonyi, refused this. György Györffy argued the "Árma branch" of the gens Hont-Pázmány consisted of Paul and his brothers, but Pál Engel did not connect them to the widely extended kindred in his genealogical work. Archaeologist Gábor Vékony assumed Paul might be a member of the gens Szalók. Nevertheless, the majority of historians accepted that both prelates with the name Paul came from the Balog kindred.

== Early career ==
According to historian István Hajnal, Paul was identical with that namesake clergyman, who was referred to as royal chaplain and papal vicar in the court of Béla IV of Hungary in 1245. However, that document later proved to be a forgery. It is also possible he is identical with that royal chaplain Paul, who was entrusted by the king to arrange in the possession matters of the gens Hahót in Zala County, assisting the work of ispán Arnold Hahót in 1237 (of course, in this case, the presumed date of birth cannot be maintained). Paul served as lector of the cathedral chapter of Esztergom from around 1251 to 1255, according to Gábor Vékony.

Paul elevated into the position of provost of Pressburg (present-day Bratislava, Slovakia) by November 1256, when he was first mentioned in this capacity. He served as vice-chancellor in the royal court of Béla IV from 1259 to 1262. Paul was elected provost of Fehérvár by December 1260, responsible for issuing royal diplomas. He held both dignities until the summer of 1262, when he was replaced by Farkas Bejc as provost and vice-chancellor.

== Bishop of Veszprém ==
Paul Balog succeeded Zlaudus Ják as Bishop of Veszprém at the turn of 1262 and 1263. He was first styled as bishop by a contemporary document in April 1263. Besides that, he was employed in the retinue of Queen Maria Laskarina, wife of Béla IV. He served as chancellor of the queenly court from 1263 until Queen Maria's death in 1270 (in documents, he bore the title for the last time in 1269). He was the first bishop of Veszprém, who held that office; later, the two positions were often filled by the same prelate.

In 1262 the hermit Eusebius of Esztergom went to Rome with his companions to meet Pope Urban IV to ask him for approval for founding his own order. He had the support of Thomas Aquinas and Cardinal Stephen I Báncsa. The pope first refused to give Eusebius his permission because of financial conditions and asked Paul Balog to examine the monasteries in 1263. Following investigations, a new regula was given the congregation by Paul, fundamentally contributing to the formal formation of the monastic order, the Pauline Fathers or more officially, the Order of Saint Paul the First Hermit. His role was also preserved by the 15th-century Pauline friar Gergely Gyöngyösi in his manuscript. Paul also confirmed the collection right of tithe to the nuns of Veszprém Valley, granted by one of his predecessors, Robert in 1210. In 1265–1266, he launched a lawsuit against the relatives of his late predecessor Zlaudus Ják, who arbitrarily seized the fort of Tátika along with episcopal treasures and charters. King Béla IV restored the previously confiscated revenues and usurped privileges to the Diocese of Veszprém in 1269. The monarch also confirmed the bishop of Veszprém's right of crowning the queen consort of Hungary, which they claimed many times being an established tradition since 1216).

Despite that Paul was a faithful supporter of King Béla IV and Queen Maria in the 1260s (he was referred to as a member of the royal council in 1267), which period was characterized by civil war conditions with their eldest son and heir Duke Stephen, the bishop was able to retain his influence after the death of Béla IV and the coronation of Stephen V in May 1270. It is possible that Paul performed the coronation and anointment of Elizabeth the Cuman as queen consort in the same time, but there is no specific source for that. After a short war between Stephen V and his long-time rival, Ottokar II of Bohemia in the spring of 1271, Paul Balog led a Hungarian delegation to Pressburg, where negotiated with Ottokar's envoy, Bruno von Schauenburg, Bishop of Olomouc. The peace treaty was signed on 2 July 1271.

After the death of Stephen V, Paul Balog was made chancellor in the royal court of the minor Ladislaus IV. He first appeared in this capacity on 15 November 1272. He was deprived from his office and was replaced by Philip Türje some days after 9 December. However, the elderly archbishop died on 18 December, and Paul regained the position by January 1273. He was again dismissed as chancellor two months later, when Nicholas Kán appeared in this capacity. For the third time, Paul was reinstated as chancellor around June 1273 and now, he was able to retain the dignity until his death. These rapid changes also well presented the chaotic years during the minority of Ladislaus IV, when various baronial factions fought for the supreme power. Paul performed the coronation of Ladislaus' spouse Isabella of Sicily as queen consort sometime between 11 and 16 July 1273, according to her reminiscence from 1280. Paul Balog was last mentioned as a living person on 2 January 1275. He died by March, when the position of Bishop of Veszprém was in a vacancy. He was succeeded by Peter Kőszegi around May 1275.

== Identification theory ==
According to the 18th-century historian and librarian György Pray (Dissertationes histori- co-criticae in Annales veteres Hunnorum, Avarum et Hungarorum, 1774), Paul Balog was identical with the chronicler Anonymus (or Master P.), author of the Gesta Hungarorum. Archaeologist Gábor Vékony shared this viewpoint. Consequently, Vékony claimed the work was completed in the second half of the 13th century, unlike the majority of modern scholars, who argued Anonymus was a notary of Béla III of Hungary (r. 1172–1196). The chronicler dedicated his work to a former schoolmate "the most venerable man N", this address implies Anonymus had to be a prelate. Vékony argued Anonymus (Paul) deliberately wrote his "apocryphal gesta" as if he were a contemporary of Béla I of Hungary (r. 1060–1063). The author knew Veszprém, Komárom and the surrounding area well, where from Paul and his family originated. During his tenure as its chancellor, Queen's Chancellery issued a charter for Paul's brother Benedict in 1265, in which the term is included "de genere Turda", referring to the gens Tardos (or Tordos), which owned lands in the same area. Beside that, the name "Turda" appears exclusively in the Gesta Hungarorum. Vékony argued the phraseological similarity (place names, geographical names) between the Gesta Hungarorum and the establishing charter of the abbey of Százd proves that Paul Balog was present, when Béla IV transcribed the latter in 1267. The historian added, similarities between the work and Béla's "Tartar letter" (c. 1248) also proves that Paul belonged to the close retinue of the Hungarian monarch by that time. Vékony found phraseological identities also between the gesta and his regula provided for the Pauline friars in 1263.

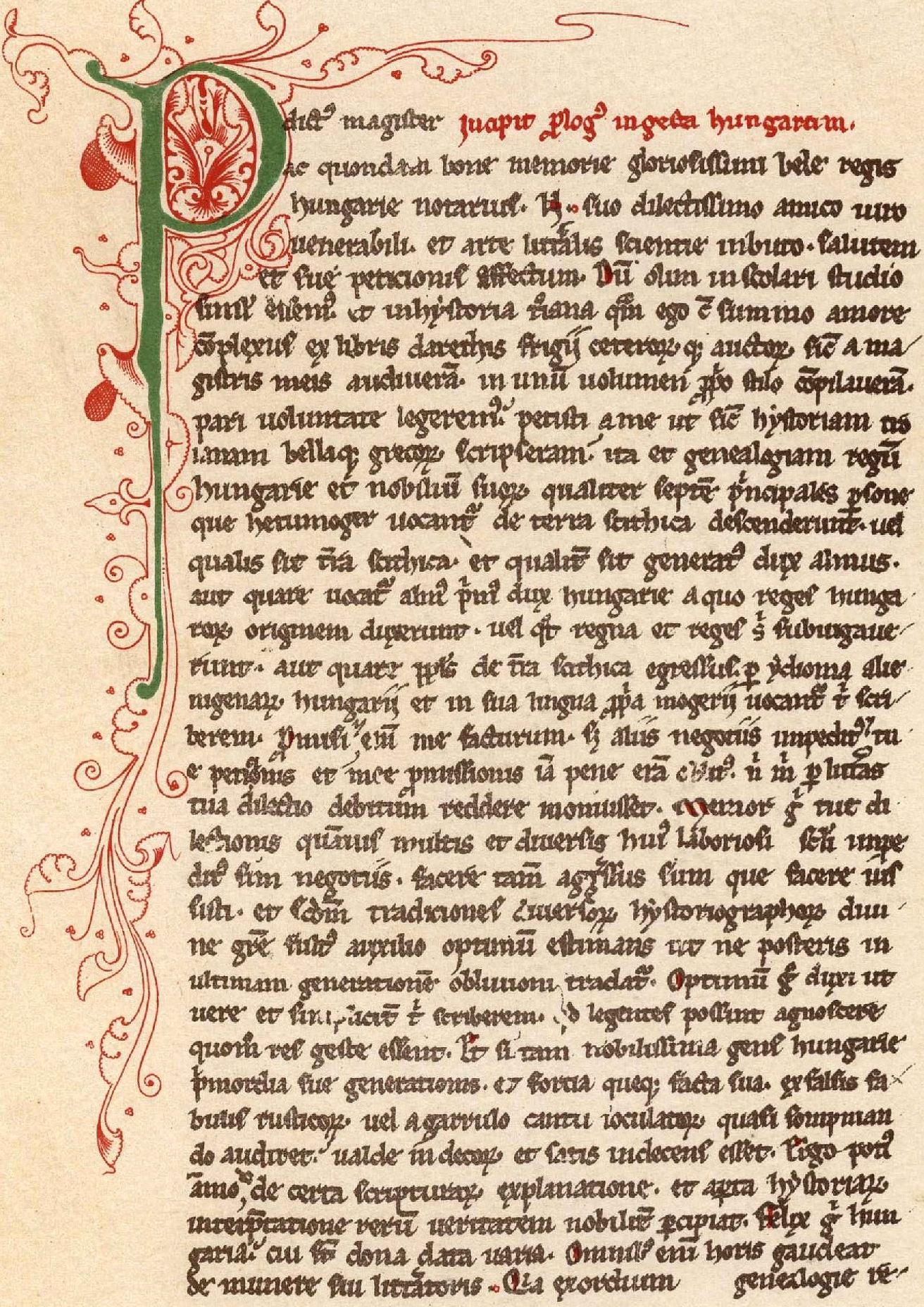
First page of the Gesta Hungarorum

Based on his hypothesis, Vékony considered that Paul Balog attended a foreign universitas sometime between 1237 and 1248. Anonymus had a detailed knowledge of literacy works, for instance, he had found pleasure in reading the Trojan History, a work attributed to Dares Phrygius. During Paul's tenure (perhaps he himself was responsible for its establishment), there was an illustrious cathedral chapter school in Veszprém (but not universitas, as Vékony incorrectly claimed), containing a sizable library and archives. However, Palatine Peter Csák's troops (as enemy of the Kőszegis, thus also Peter Kőszegi, during the 1270s civil war) devastated and pillaged the whole Diocese of Veszprém in 1276, the school was never rebuilt. According to the account of the late Paul Balog's namesake nephew, then a canon at Veszprém, his own damages amounted to around 4,000 marks, including the loss of his books (1000 marks), which he "inherited from his progenitors". Vékony argued these manuscripts and chronicles were initially part of the elder Paul's collection, who used these works for writing the Gesta Hungarorum. Vékony claimed Paul Balog (Anonymus) knew and despised the gesta of his contemporary Ákos. Also a former chancellor in the queenly court, they had personal conflicts each other, in addition to various lawsuits between the Diocese of Veszprém and the Provostry of Óbuda (where Ákos was provost) over numerous possessions. Thus, Paul Balog had to wrote his Gesta Hungarorum after Ákos' work, most presumably in 1273, when he was replaced as royal chancellor by Nicholas Kán for a relatively longer time. Paul's confrontation with his successor (who belonged to the rival baronial group in that time) contributed to that the author of Gesta Hungarorum indicated the gens Kán of "unknown origin" (while magister Ákos derived them from the lineage of gyulas). While Paul was a partisan of the gens Csák during the 1270s feudal anarchy, Ákos stood with their rival, the Kőszegi family (he possibly intentionally placed their arrival to the age of Grand Prince Géza [r. 972–997], emphasizing its ancient origin, while in fact, they only came to Hungary in the 1140s). In addition to Ákos, Vékony claimed that Simon of Kéza, author of the Gesta Hunnorum et Hungarorum knew and used Anonymus' work (against the mainstream position). To substantiate the claim, Vékony argued Simon attended the chapter school of Veszprém between 1273 and 1276 (where read the Gesta Hungarorum), before moving to a foreign universitas. After the devastation of Veszprém in 1276, Anonymus' gesta somehow went abroad and disappeared for centuries.

Several historians, including Gyula Kristó, László Veszprémy and Gábor Thoroczkay did not accept Gábor Vékony's theory, also refusing the Gesta Hungarorum's assumed time of compilation to the time of King Béla IV. In addition, Thoroczkay argued Vékony did not take into account a number of facts which would have contradicted his theory (for instance, that Anonymus had a detailed knowledge of the lands along the upper courses of the river Tisza, in the opposite part of the kingdom from that region, where Paul Balog lived and operated). His text comparisons are arbitrarily selected examples to match the identification of Paul with the chronicler, and there are also phraseological similarities with other documents, which Paul had nothing to do with, as Thoroczkay added.

== Sources ==
- Markó, László (2006). A magyar állam főméltóságai Szent Istvántól napjainkig: Életrajzi Lexikon [Great Officers of State in Hungary from King Saint Stephen to Our Days: A Biographical Encyclopedia] (in Hungarian). Helikon Kiadó. ISBN 963-208-970-7.
- Solymosi, László (1994). "Az Árpád-kori veszprémi püspökök tevékenysége okleveleink tükrében [Activity of the Bishops of Veszprém from the Age of Árpáds on the Basis of Their Charters]". In V. Fodor, Zsuzsa (ed.). Veszprém kora középkori emlékei (Veszprémi Múzeumi Konferenciák 5.) (in Hungarian). Laczkó Dezső Múzeum, Veszprém. pp. 49–62. ISBN 963-7208-42-9.
- Thoroczkay, Gábor (1995). "Az Anonymus-kérdés kutatástörténeti áttekintése (1977–1993). II. közlemény [Research History Overview of the Anonymous Question (1977–1993), Vol. 2.]". Fons (in Hungarian). 2 (2). Szentpétery Imre Történettudományi Alapítvány: 117–173. ISSN 1217-8020.
- Vékony, Gábor (1991). "Anonymus kora és korhűsége IV. [The Age and Contemporariness of Anonymus, Part IV.]". Életünk (in Hungarian). 29 (4): 355–375. ISSN 0133-4751.
- Zsoldos, Attila (2005). Az Árpádok és asszonyaik. A királynéi intézmény az Árpádok korában [The Árpáds and their Women: The Institution of Queenship in the Era of the Árpáds] (in Hungarian). MTA Történettudományi Intézete. ISBN 963 8312 98 X.
- Zsoldos, Attila (2011). Magyarország világi archontológiája, 1000–1301 [Secular Archontology of Hungary, 1000–1301] (in Hungarian). História, MTA Történettudományi Intézete. ISBN 978-963-9627-38-3.

Paul Genus Balog Born: ? Died: January/March 1275
Political offices
Preceded by Philip	Vice-chancellor; 1259–1262	Succeeded by Farkas Bejc
Preceded by Mutimir	Chancellor of the Queen; 1263–1270	Succeeded by Philip
Preceded by Stephen Báncsa	Chancellor; 1272	Succeeded by Philip Türje
Preceded by Philip Türje	Chancellor; 1273	Succeeded by Nicholas Kán
Preceded by Nicholas Kán	Chancellor; 1273–1275	Succeeded by Job Záh
Catholic Church titles
Preceded by Philip (elected)	Provost of Székesfehérvár (elected); 1260–1262	Succeeded by Farkas Bejc
Preceded by Zlaudus Ják	Bishop of Veszprém; 1263–1275	Succeeded by Peter Kőszegi
