= Lodomer =

13th-century Catholic archbishop

- Archbishop of Esztergom
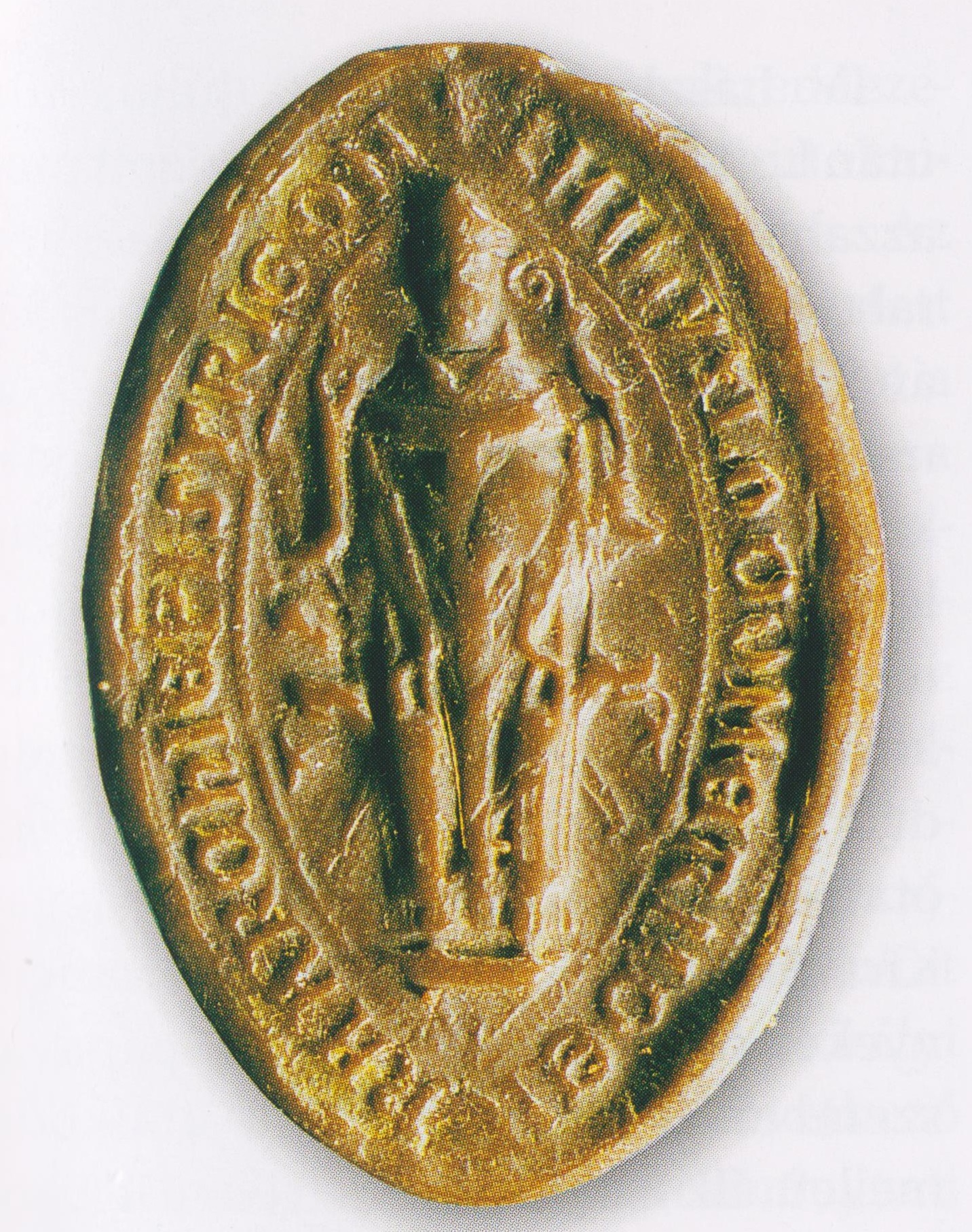
- Seal of Archbishop Lodomer, 1291
- Installed: 13 June 1279
- Term ended: 2 January 1298
- Predecessor: Nicholas Kán
- Successor: Gregory Bicskei
- Other post: Bishop of Várad

Personal details
- Born: c. 1235
- Died: 2 January 1298 (aged c. 63)
- Denomination: Roman Catholic

Lodomer (Hungarian: Lodomér; c. 1235 – 2 January 1298) was a prelate in the Kingdom of Hungary in the second half of the 13th century. He was Archbishop of Esztergom between 1279 and 1298, and Bishop of Várad (now Oradea in Romania) from 1268 till 1279. He was an opponent of Ladislaus IV of Hungary whom he excommunicated for failing to force the Cumans to adopt the Christian way of life. After Ladislaus' death, Lodomer and his suffragans were dedicated supporters of Andrew III of Hungary, who aimed to restore strong royal power against the rebellious lords and oligarchs.

== Theories of origin ==
Lodomer or Ladomer was presumably born in the 1230s, not long before the First Mongol invasion of Hungary. He had an unnamed sister, the mother of Thomas, also an Archbishop of Esztergom, who studied in the University of Padua, courtesy of Lodomer. His ancestry, parentage and kinship relations have long been disputed among historians. Based on alleged "old manuscripts", 18th-century historian Miklós Schmitth claimed Lodomer originated from the territory of the Kievan Rus', and was a relative of Rostislav Mikhailovich and the Rurikids. (Lodomer can be interpreted as a Latinized form of the Slavic name Vladimir.) It is presumable that, in fact, Schmitth deduced that conclusion only from the prelate's forename and its similarity to Ruthenian principality Lodomeria. Referring to a papal letter allegedly from the end of the 13th century, historian János Török also argued in favour of the Ruthenian ancestry in 1853. He argued Lodomer's real name was John and called himself "Lodomericus" ("a man from Lodomeria") after arriving to Hungary. However contemporary scholar Nándor Knauz proved that papal letter was written 100 years later, at the end of the 14th century, and it referred to then archbishop John Kanizsai.

Himself Knauz also dealt with the issue in his large-scale monography Monumenta ecclesiae Strigoniensis. He claimed Lodomer originated from the gens (clan) Monoszló and has put forward three arguments; Archbishop Lodomer called a certain Maurice of Mencshely and Gregory, son of Saul from Monoszló as his blood relatives ("consanguineorum nostrorum") in 1292, when he donated his land of Henye in Zala County to them. When Gregory bought Sásdi (near to Monoszló) in 1297, the cathedral chapter of Veszprém referred to him as Lodomer's nephew ("nepos"). In 1317, Charles I of Hungary mentioned his loyal servant Egidius, son of Gregory, who died without male heir, as a member of the Monoszló clan. Thus Knauz identified Gregory, Lodomer's nephew with Gregory II Monoszló, the father of Egidius. A 1296 charter also mentioned that Gregory related to Bánd and Csaba, members of the gens Atyusz. Lodomer's biographer (2003), theologian Margit Beke supported Knauz's claim, arguing Lodomer issued his last surviving charter in late 1297 in Monoszló, two months before his death. However genealogist János Karácsonyi refused Knauz's theory, as Gregory Monoszló's father was Thomas, as he already outlined the clan's family tree at the turn of the 19th and 20th centuries.

For the first time, Karácsonyi's contemporary Mór Wertner identified Lodomer as a member of the Vázsony kindred, as he considered Bánd and Csaba belonged to that clan too. Later he revised his position and claimed the archbishop was the son of a certain Lawrence, a local landowner in Henye, mentioned by a royal charter in 1237. Historian Attila Zsoldos refused Wertner's argument, as the fact that Lodomer was granted landholding in Henye is not necessarily link to his hypothetical ancestry. Instead, Zsoldos clearly identified Maurice of Mencshely with Maurice Vázsony, the bailiff of Archbishop Lodomer's episcopal court in Esztergom. Zsoldos assumed Lodomer was the brother of Gregory's father, Saul, himself also a son of certain Mika. After philological and canon law considerations regarding the phrase "consanguineus" used by the well-educated Lodomer in 1292, historian Tamás Körmendi argued that Maurice and Gregory were the archbishop's patrilineal relatives – thus Lodomer himself was indeed a member of the Vázsony clan and the son of Mika. Historian Péter Kis considered that there were two Monoszló clans at the end of the era of Árpáds: the first, which originated from today's Podravska Moslavina (Hungarian: Monoszló; in Croatia) and provided influential barons; and the second one, a significantly poorer and minor clan, Lodomer allegedly belonged to this, which came from Monoszló in Veszprém County, near to Vázsony and Mencshely.

== Early career and studies ==
Lodomer is first mentioned by contemporary records between 1257 and 1261, when he functioned as the cantor in the cathedral chapter of Veszprém. Beside his duty to proclaim the Scripture readings used in the Liturgy of the Word, Lodomer was responsible for management of the cathedral school of Veszprém and teaching the clerics and the poor scholars, in accordance with the Canon 18 of the Third Council of the Lateran (1179). Additionally, he led the local place of authentication in this capacity. For this reason, 19th-century scholar Vince Bunyitay considered Lodomer attended the clerical school in Veszprém. This biographical data is largely an assumption, nevertheless Lodomer was already referred to as a magister at the end of the 1250s, reflecting the acquisition of some basics of canonical studies by then. After 1260, Lodomer disappears from the sources for the next three years. As Margit Beke argued he studied canon law and Roman law at the University of Bologna during that period.

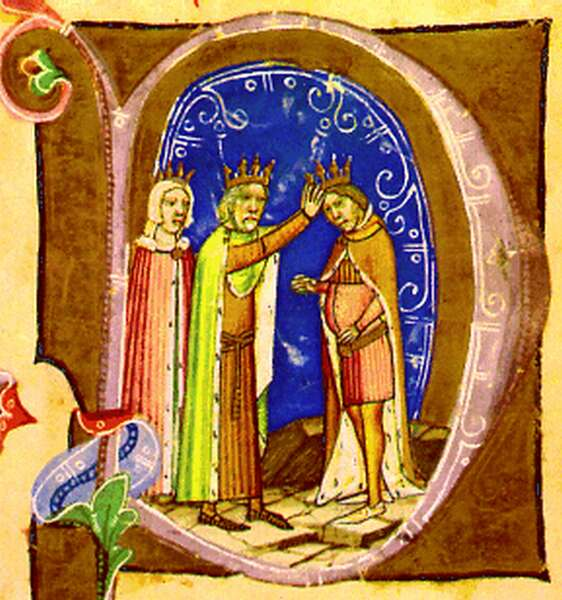
Stephen V is crowned by his father, Béla IV (from the Illuminated Chronicle)

Körmendi noted that Lodomer's letters (missilis), which reflect his deepened legal and philological knowledge, prove that he was one of the most educated Hungarian prelates of the 13th century, thus he certainly attended an Italian universitas, but the exact location and date are uncertain. Considering a standard three-year study leave among the canons, which was secured and encouraged by the Roman Curia, Körmendi agreed that Lodomer studied abroad (most likely in Italy) between 1261 and 1264. Based on the researches of literary historian Rabán Gerézdi (1941), Hungarian historiography claimed that a certain Lodomer, son of comes Denis, who was a student of the University of Bologna on 26 October 1268 according to a register, is identical with the namesake prelate. However, at the latest, Lodomer was already styled as elected and confirmed Bishop of Várad on 9 November, according to a royal charter of Béla IV of Hungary. Nevertheless, Körmendi added if Lodomer is identical with that student, his relationship to the Atyusz kindred becomes more established, as there were two clan members named Denis during his time.

Returning home, Lodomer served as vice-chancellor in the royal court of junior king Stephen from 1264 to 1266, replacing Benedict, who defected to the partisans of Béla IV. Duke Stephen's relationship with his father Béla IV deteriorated by the early 1260s. Lodomer remained loyal to Stephen in the emerging 1260s civil war between the king and the duke, but took on a role of a mediator and conciliator in order to prevent the escalation of their conflict. The motivation of Lodomer's loyalty to Duke Stephen remained hidden. Historian Jenő Szűcs outlined three social groups according to their motivations to join the ducal court. In this sense, Lodomer belonged to that youth with illustrious Transdanubian aristocratic origin, who remained without office due to the influence of older generations in the royal court of Béla IV.

== Bishop of Várad ==
Lodomer was elected Bishop of Várad (today Oradea, Romania) at the latest on 9 November 1268. By then his confirmation was made by Pope Clement IV (died weeks later). Lodomer's last known predecessor Zosimus was last appeared as bishop in contemporary documents on 17 October 1265, when King Béla countersigned his last will and testament. Thus it is possible that Lodomer was already installed as his successor in 1266, after leaving the office of vice chancellery. The Diocese of Várad laid in the territory of Stephen's realm during his election. Lodomer was granted the land of Henye for his advice and mediation role by Béla IV still in that year. When Stephen V ascended the Hungarian throne in May 1270, he granted tax exemption for those serfs and hospes who were subjects of the Diocese of Várad, in addition to free use of mines for the bishopric. The king also permitted that the lands of the extinct local noble families have been transferred to the diocese. Lodomer founded monasteries, clerical schools and provided priests to numerous villages; these all were part of a restoration attempt in the territory of the diocese, which suffered heavy damages during the Mongol invasion decades earlier. According to a charter, Lodomer summoned an assembly, where subjects of the Diocese of Várad took an oath of allegiance before the reliquary of St. Ladislaus. Lodomer was a member of the royal council during the short reign of Stephen V.

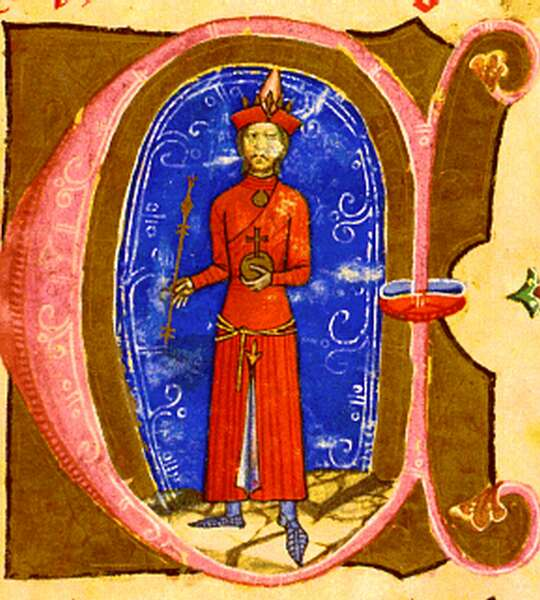
Ladislaus IV as depicted in the Illuminated Chronicle. Initially, Lodomer supported his efforts, but later became his inexorable opponent.

When Stephen V fell ill and died on 6 August 1272, it marked the beginning of the era of feudal anarchy, when two rival baronial groups struggled for power during the minority of Ladislaus IV under his mother, Elizabeth's regency. Initially, Lodomer was a staunch supporter of the young king, who represented the continuation of the desired strong royal power. Following his coronation sometime after September 1272, Ladislaus IV and his escort resided in Várad, when he donated the village of Szőlős in Komárom County to Lodomer. The bishop distanced himself from the conflict between the baronial groups. Nevertheless, Lodomer and his strong ally, Peter Monoszló, who held the dignity of Bishop of Transylvania since 1270, opposed the ambition of the Geregye kindred, which had aspirations to establish dominion independently from the royal power in Bihar County, where the vast majority of the Diocese of Várad located. Consequently, Lodomer apparently became a partisan of the rival Csák–Monoszló league. In May 1277, Lodomer participated in that general assembly of the prelates, barons, noblemen, and Cumans in Rákos (near Pest), which declared the minor Ladislaus IV to be of age and authorized the 15-year-old monarch to restore internal peace with all possible means. In the next month, Ladislaus entrusted Lodomer to lead a six-member diplomatic mission to Vienna to enter into an alliance with Rudolf I of Germany against Ottokar II of Bohemia. They ratified their covenant on 12 July 1277. After the royal army captured the rebellious Nicholas Geregye's fortress at Adorján (now Adrian in Romania), Ladislaus IV held a "general assembly" for seven counties along the River Tisza near Cenad (today Cenad, Romania) in early summer of 1278. Lodomer and other prelates were involved in the meeting, where the rebellious Geregyes were executed and the Gutkeled clan swore loyalty to the monarch. Lodomer and the clergy supported Ladislaus' efforts to restore royal power against the oligarchs, but the assembly at Csanád proved to be a short-lived consolidation.

The influence of Lodomer in the Roman Curia has increased by the second half of the 1270s. Pope Innocent V appointed him to preside that church committee, which investigated and supervised the beatification process of the late princess Margaret, daughter of Béla IV. The committee resumed its work in 1276 after a four-year forced break since the death of Philip Türje, Archbishop of Esztergom (1272). The necessary investigations were taken up between 1271 and 1276, 74 miracles were ascribed to her intercession, most of them referring to curing illnesses, even someone coming back from the dead. Among those giving testimony were 27 people for whom miracles had been wrought. Margaret was beatified still in that year, but canonization process was not successful, it took place only centuries later.

The episcopal see of Esztergom was virtually vacant since 1272. After the death of Stephen Báncsa, Archbishop of Kalocsa in 1278, Lodomer became the most illustrious prelate in the Hungarian clergy, thanks to his political and church relationships in Rome and his outstanding literacy. Two representants of the rival baronial groups, Nicholas Kán and Peter Kőszegi fought for the position of archbishop of Esztergom. Pope Nicholas III summoned them to Rome in June 1278. Nicholas refused to confirm either nomination, instead, he decided to appoint the archbishop himself in accordance with the canon law. Meanwhile, Nicholas sent Philip, Bishop of Fermo, to Hungary to help Ladislaus restore royal power and to fill the position of Archbishop of Esztergom. The papal legate arrived in Hungary in early 1279. The clergy, including Lodomer became Philip's strongest ally, which also meant that they turned against Ladislaus in the long term. With the mediation of the papal legate, Pope Nicholas III appointed Lodomer as the new Archbishop of Esztergom on 13 June 1279. The Roman Curia sent his pallium on 7 May 1280, confirming the appointment.

== Archbishop of Esztergom ==
=== Ladislaus' opponent ===
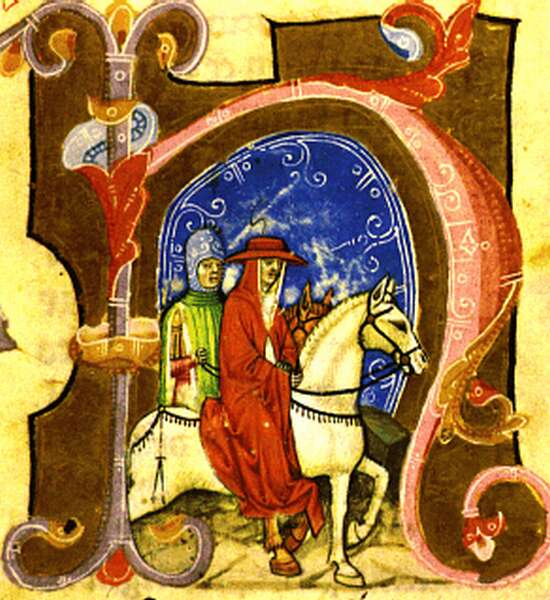
Papal legate Philip of Fermo arrives Hungary as depicted in the Illuminated Chronicle

The arrival of papal legate Philip deepened the turmoil in Hungary. Initially, with the legate's mediation, Ladislaus IV concluded a peace treaty with the Kőszegis. Bishop Philip soon realized, however, that most Cumans were still pagans in Hungary. He extracted a ceremonious promise from the Cuman chieftains of giving up their pagan customs, and persuaded the young King Ladislaus to swear an oath to enforce the keeping of the Cuman chieftains' promise. An assembly held at Tétény passed laws which, in accordance with the legate's demand, prescribed that the Cumans should leave their tents and live "in houses attached to the ground". Following that the papal legate convened a synod in Buda on 14 September 1279, where Archbishop Lodomer, his closest ally Archbishop John Hont-Pázmány and the other bishops attended. The Cumans did not obey the laws, however, and Ladislaus, himself a half-Cuman, failed to force them. In retaliation, Philip excommunicated him and placed Hungary under interdict in October. Ladislaus joined the Cumans and appealed to the Holy See, but Pope Nicholas III refused to absolve him. Under such circumstances, Lodomer's primacy was overshadowed by the papal legate, who had no regard for local political conditions, forcing the Hungarian prelates to decide between the Hungarian monarch and the Roman Curia. Following Ladislaus' step, when the Cumans seized and imprisoned Philip of Fermo in early January 1280 on his demand, Lodomer and the bishops, who expressed "the liberty of the Church", turned against the royal power, and became his relentless opponents. Soon, Ladislaus was also captured. In less than two months, both the legate and the king were set free following mediation negotiations by Lodomer, and Ladislaus took a new oath to enforce the Cuman laws.

When Bishop Philip of Fermo left Hungary in the autumn of 1281, Lodomer attempted to restore political consolidation, which existed for a short time in 1277–78, before the violent intervention of the Roman Curia. He offered the support of the Hungarian Church to Ladislaus and interceded to Pope Martin IV in order to invalidate some of the radical measures and decisions of papal legate Philip. Lodomer also recognized the king's right of patronage over Hungarian church properties and dignities. Lodomer's hope to retake the king to the Christian affiliation has become real, when a Cuman army invaded the southern parts of Hungary in autumn 1282, and Ladislaus vanquished the invaders's army in the Battle of Lake Hód. According to Pope Martin's letters with optimistic tone throughout in 1282 and 1283, Lodomer "carefully, wisely and relentlessly contributed" in the reconciliation efforts between the monarch and the Holy See. For instance, Ladislaus and Lodomer jointly convened a general congregatio near Szeged in October 1282. However Lodomer's efforts failed by the end of 1283, when Ladislaus was unable to defeat the Kőszegi family. As historian Jenő Szűcs noted, the young king adopted an "anachronistic autocratic" system, omitting the royal council, nobility and church. Ladislaus abandoned his wife, Isabella, and settled among the Cumans by the end of the year. The contemporary public mood is well characterized by that fact when the Second Mongol invasion occurred during the winter of 1285–86, many of his subjects accused Ladislaus of inciting the Mongols to invade Hungary. In fact, Ladislaus employed Mongol prisoners of war, known as nyögérs, when he subjugated a rebellion in the Szepesség in September 1285.

Lodomer persuaded Ladislaus to convene a general assembly in the early summer of 1286 in order to reconciliation between the king and the powerful Kőszegi family, who plundered villages and regions in Transdanubia in recent years. There Ladislaus provided one-year grace period to the Kőszegis and their familiares. In September 1286, the king managed a self-coup, expelling members of the Kőszegi–Borsa baronial group from the royal council. Neglecting the Kőszegis' rival, the Aba clan, Ladislaus IV appointed his own loyal soldiers and lesser nobles to the high positions. As regards Lodomer, he finally finished the intent of reconciliation, when Ladislaus imprisoned his wife and granted all her revenues to his Cuman mistress, Aydua. At the command of Pope Honorius IV, Lodomer intended to declare a crusade against the Hungarian king and his Cuman subjects, and Honorius also intended to send letters to the neighboring monarchs to support the archbishop in that effort. However, the pope's death in April 1287 prevented this goal. When Ladislaus left Buda to prepare a military campaign against the Kőszegi–Borsa league, Lodomer liberated Queen Isabella from her captivity at Rabbits' Island in September 1287. After that the queen moved to Esztergom and established her own court there under the protection of Lodomer and his troops. Then the archbishop summoned the prelates, the barons, and the noblemen to an assembly in Buda in November 1287 (called universitas) and excommunicated Ladislaus. Lodomer here also entrusted Peter Monoszló to recover the arbitrarily confiscated queenly estates surrounding Beszterce (present-day Bistrița, Romania) from the town's magistrate. Supported by the cardinals, Lodomer appealed to such a parliament to gain legitimacy for measures against Ladislaus IV.

In response, the infuriated king stated that "beginning with the archbishop of Esztergom and his suffragans, I shall exterminate the whole lot right up to Rome with the aid of Tartar swords", according to Lodomer's highly dubious report. The barons captured Ladislaus in the Szepesség in January 1288. Although his partisans soon liberated him, he, similarly to the "legendary Proteus", as Lodomer described him in his letter, acquiesced in concluding an agreement with the archbishop in March 1288. The king granted a right to collect customs duties to the cathedral chapter of Esztergom. Lodomer absolved Ladislaus on condition that the king would live in accordance with Christian morals. The monarch promised not to seek contact with the Tatars (Mongols), not to appoint non-Christians to office, and to distance himself from the group of lords whom Lodomer called "disgraceful Catholics" (e.g. Makján Aba and Mojs Ákos). The king also promised to take back his wife, Isabella. However, Ladislaus broke his promise in the next month, when imprisoned opponent lords in Buda. He also abducted his sister, Elizabeth, prioress of the Dominican Monastery of the Blessed Virgin on Rabbits' Island, and gave her in marriage to a Czech aristocrat, Záviš of Falkenstein. According to Archbishop Lodomer, Ladislaus even stated, "If I had 15 or more sisters in as many cloistered communities as you like, I would snatch them from there to marry them off licitly or illicitly; in order to procure through them a kin-group who will support me by all their power in the fulfillment of my will".

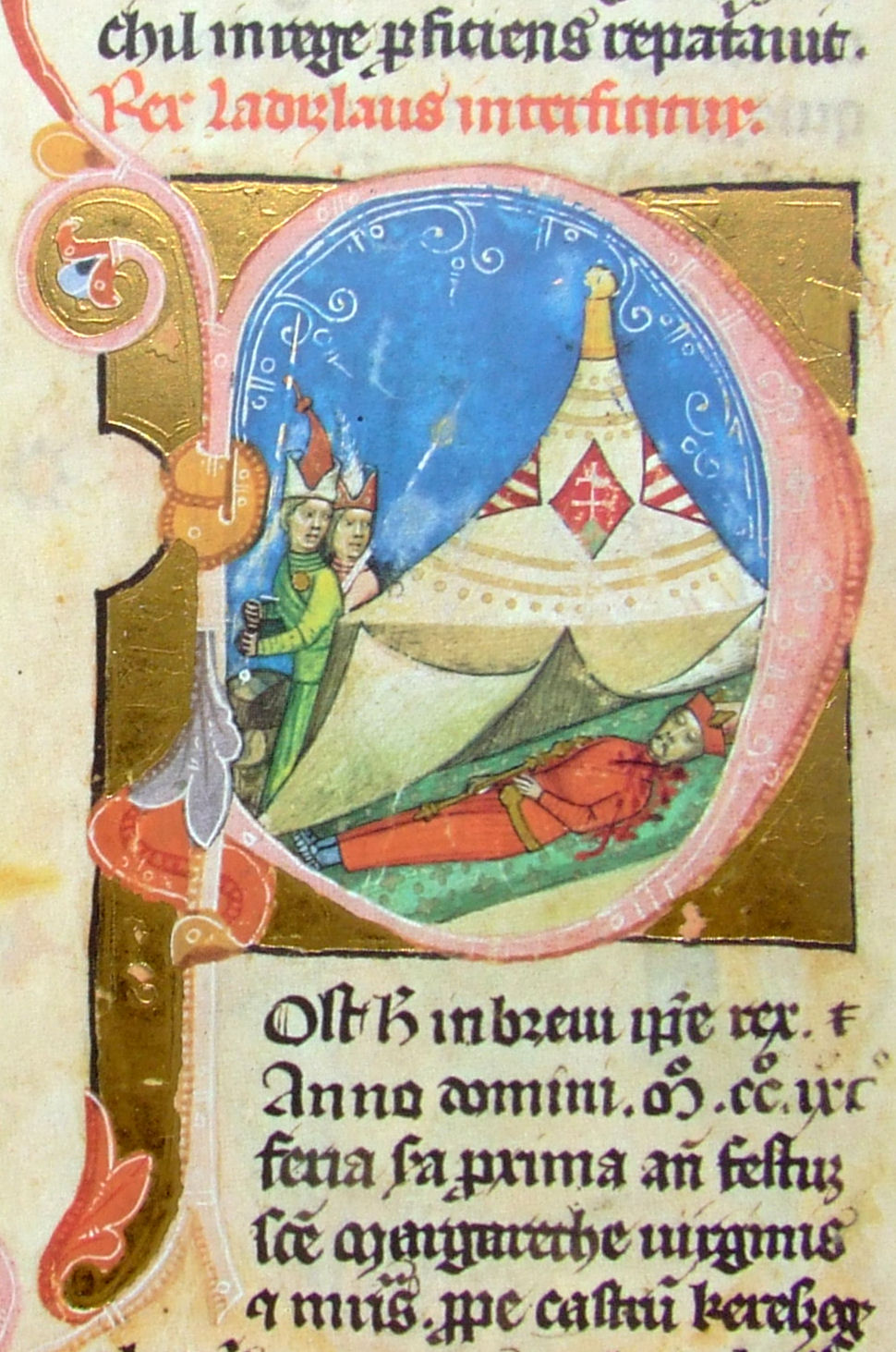
Cuman assassins murder Ladislaus in Körösszeg (Cheresig, Romania) on 10 July 1290

On 8 May 1288, Lodomer described the above mentioned events in his letter to Pope Nicholas IV. He listed the king's violations, scandals and his complaints regarding the chaotic situation in the kingdom. Beside the king, Lodomer deeply condemned the behavior of Elizabeth too, calling her "antimonialis" instead of "sancti", who encouraged his brother to commit the kidnapping and broke her own monastic vow. Additionally, he considered the too close relationship between Záviš's two wives to be scandalous (Kunigunda and Elizabeth were cousins). Two of his 1288 documents were discovered by French historian Charles-Victor Langlois. He sent the two letters to János Karácsonyi in 1908, who translated and first published in 1910. Two other letters were found in the collection of Pietro della Vigna. All of them are primary sources for the political history of Hungary in the Age of Late Árpáds, in addition their literary value. Historian Kornél Szovák argued the individual style, the usage of terminology, and literary motifs prove that Lodomer personally wrote the letters. Szovák analyzed that Lodomer (or his chancellor) used his legal and theological knowledge as an argumentative weapon against Ladislaus. For instance, when quoted Ladislaus IV, who allegedly replied to Lodomer with the sentence "For me, I am the law and I do not tolerate that the laws of such priests constrain me", in response to criticisms, is a reference to the Bible, which described the pagans' way of life with the same phrases, and Pope Innocent III's decretals, which determined "the liberty of the Church" from secular powers. According to the archbishop, Ladislaus copulated with his favorite concubine, Aydua, whom the archbishop described as a "poisonous viper", in public. Lodomer cited antique works (the tale of Proteus, poems of Horace, Ovid and Livy's Ab Urbe Condita Libri), in addition to such recent Christian texts, like Bernard of Clairvaux's De consideratione, regarding the theory of "two swords". Consequently, Lodomer's accounts about the events in the 1280s are quite questionable.

The two archbishops, Lodomer and John Hont-Pázmány compromised with the most powerful oligarchs, who divided the royal positions among them, while Ladislaus spent the last years of his life wandering from place to place, having lost all of his influence and support. To counterbalance the royal court's recent ideological basis, the Gesta Hunnorum et Hungarorum and to emphasize the role of the Christian king, Lodomer commissioned an unidentified Augustinian friar to write the rhythmic story of Stephen I of Hungary, the founder of the Christian kingdom. According to literary historian László Mezey, the poem deliberately contrasts Stephen, a Christian monarch with Attila, a pagan ruler, highlighting that the Hungarians were saved from the yoke of the tyrant Attila by Saint Stephen. Lodomer participated in the assembly of Föveny in June 1289, which ended without results. Following that the archbishop urged Pope Nicholas IV to proclaim a crusade against Ladislaus and the Cumans. Lodomer turned away from the king for good, when Ladislaus authorized Duke Albert of Austria to launch a military campaign against the Kőszegis' territories throughout 1289, which violated Hungary's sovereignty since the Austrians invaded and conquered vast territories along the western border. With the consent of Lodomer, the Kőszegis offered the crown to the king's distant relative Andrew the Venetian, who arrived to Hungary in early 1290. Lodomer later backed down from the plan, perhaps realizing that the claimant to the throne did not have a broad base of supporters, so he did not want to involve Hungary in an unnecessary civil war. Thereafter, the arriving Andrew was captured by Arnold Hahót and surrendered him to Duke Albert. In response, Ladislaus prepared a war to Transdanubia, however he, who had always been partial towards his Cuman subjects, was assassinated by three Cumans at the castle of Körösszeg (now Cheresig in Romania) on 10 July 1290. It is plausible that Lodomer was not involved in organizing the murder.

=== Andrew's ally ===
Following the assassination, Lodomer subsequently dispatched two Williamite monks to Vienna to inform Andrew of the king's death. With the monks' assistance, Andrew left his prison in disguise and hastened to Hungary. Upon his arrival, Archbishop Lodomer crowned Andrew III king in Székesfehérvár on 23 July 1290. The lords and prelates swore loyalty to Andrew only after he issued a charter promising the restoration of internal peace and respect for the privileges of the nobility and the clergymen. The document was formulated by Lodomer himself. Andrew convened a national assembly to Óbuda in the first days of September 1290, where he promised to preserve the rights and privileges of the nobility. Although, the Kőszegis and Lodomer jointly invited Andrew III to the Hungarian throne, their motivation was different: the oligarchs wanted a new controllable and weak-handed ruler to lead the kingdom instead of the unpredictable Ladislaus, while Lodomer and his suffragans were aimed to strengthen the royal power to put an end to the political anarchy. Lodomer and John Hont-Pázmány welcomed the arriving Queen Fenenna in Upper Hungary; she became the first wife of Andrew III before the end of 1290.

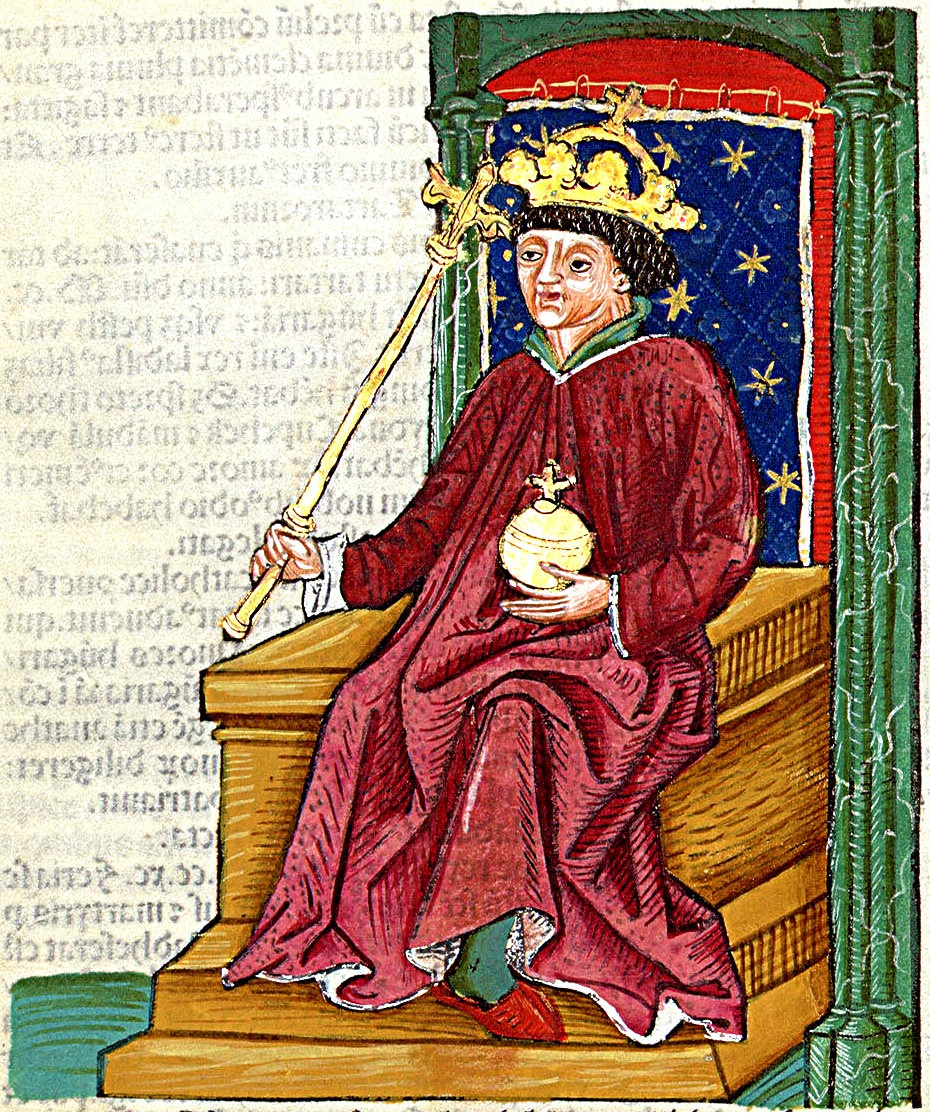
Andrew III depicted in the Chronica Hungarorum

Under Lodomer, the prelates became the strongest supporters of Andrew's reign, which decade was described as the "era of the early estates of the realm in Hungary" by historian József Gerics. Andrew and Lodomer were looking for an alliance with the lower nobility against the most powerful oligarchs to prevent the disintegration of the unified state. They also kept it in mind that they wished to keep the power aspirations of the Holy See and the Holy Roman Empire outside. The 34 articles of the Diet of Óbuda reflect all these efforts. Their goal was to strengthen royal power, not to ensure the freedoms of the estates. The most important stipulation was the restoration of church property rights after two decades of confiscations and turmoil, in addition to the demolition of illegally built forts and castles. According to József Gerics, Lodomer and his suffragans acted royal advisers beside Andrew, excluding the barons of the realm, who, however, continued to participate in the decisions of the royal court as subsequent royal charters prove it. Lodomer, who was considered the advocate of the Roman Curia's interventions during the reign of Ladislaus IV in the 1280s, confronted with the Holy See after Andrew's coronation. Lodomer and his colleagues became the strongest pillars of the royal power, to protect the national sovereignty of the kingdom even against the pope's aspirations. On 31 January 1291, Pope Nicholas IV sent a letter to Lodomer, in which he expressed disappointment that the archbishop abandoned his previous "good habit" of continuous correspondence to inform the Holy See about the domestic conditions in Hungary. The pope noted "you've become almost a different person, who, to be addicted to a preventable indolence, did not inform the Holy See neither about the king's death, nor the situation of the country, nor the huge turmoil and nor the pretenders to the throne".

In 1291, Andrew III invaded Austria, forcing Albert to withdraw his garrisons from the towns and fortresses that he had captured years before. Lodomer participated in the campaign, leading his episcopal army. Following that Lodomer and John Hont-Pázmány, together with a Williamite monk, negotiated with Albert's envoys Bernhard of Prambach, Bishop of Passau and Leopold, Bishop of Seckau about the conditions for peace. The Peace of Hainburg, which concluded the war, was signed on 26 August, and three days later Andrew and Albert of Austria confirmed it at their meeting in Köpcsény (now Kopčany in Slovakia). In accordance with Lodomer's goal, the peace treaty prescribed the destruction of the fortresses that Albert of Austria had seized from the Kőszegis earlier. Lodomer and the three other prelates used the terminology of the Roman and canon laws in the arenga of the document. The text describes the model of the perfect Christian ruler in Lodomer's eyes: "[...] for the powerful monarchs of the countries, who are not restricted by law, the greatest glory is [...] if they voluntarily obey the laws, and they embrace the right-inspiring, blessed compulsion in accordance with the voice of the Holy Writ".

The Peace of Hainburg resulted that the Kőszegis rose up in open rebellion against Andrew in spring 1292, acknowledging Charles Martel, as King of Hungary, whose claim was also supported by the Holy See. In response, Lodomer excommunicated Ivan Kőszegi, expressing his opposition to the Roman Curia and its protege, the Angevins. Thirteen years earlier, he still subjected himself to Philip of Fermo and the pope's interests despite his better conviction, which caused the failure of the consolidation attempt. The royal troops subdued the rebellion by July, but the Kőszegis captured and imprisoned Andrew during his journey to Slavonia in August. Andrew was liberated within four months, after his supporters sent their relatives as hostages to the Kőszegis. Despite Lodomer's theoretical activity, Hungary was in a state of constant anarchy during Andrew's reign. The Kőszegis, the Csáks, the Borsas and other powerful families autonomously governed their domains, rising up nearly every year in open rebellion against Andrew in the second half of the 1290s. Andrew III again declared war against the Kőszegi brothers in August 1296, and Archbishop Lodomer excommunicated them. The archbishop personally participated in the military campaign with his banderium, but Andrew and his occasional ally, Albert could not subdue them.

In his last months, Lodomer resided in Monoszló, then Budafelhévíz (today a borough in the 2nd district of Budapest). He held a synod on 14 December 1297. He sent his last letter on 28 December. According to Pauline historian Gergely Gyöngyösi's Vitae fratrum Eremitarum Ordinis Sancti Pauli Primi Eremitae (1496), Lodomer died on 2 January 1298. John Hont-Pázmány became the leading figure of the royal council. The subsequent 1298 laws, which circumscribed the feudal institutions, reflected Lodomer's political will, but the delicate balance was broken between Andrew III and the prelates after his death, despite Archbishop John's efforts. With the election of the pro-Angevin Gregory Bicskei as Lodomer's successor, the consistency between the clergy also eliminated.

=== His ecclesiastical lordship ===
Lodomer held at least four provincial synods (1286, 1292, 1294 and 1297) during his 19-year episcopate. He permitted the burghers of Szepes Castle (today Spiš in Slovakia) in 1280 to secede from the affiliation of the St. Ladislaus parish and build a church for themselves, maintaining the suzerainty of the Archdiocese of Esztergom. Alongside Andrew III and other prelates, he was present at the consecration of the Franciscans' Virgin Mary Church in Pressburg (present-day Bratislava, Slovakia) on 26 March 1297, celebrated by vicar James. Pope Clement IV subordinated the Augustine monastery of Titel to Esztergom in 1294. Lodomer donated the Saint Vitus Basilica of Esztergom to the Williamite friars to defend themselves during the second Mongol invasion. Lodomer approved the regulation of the Order of Saint Paul the First Hermit around 1297.

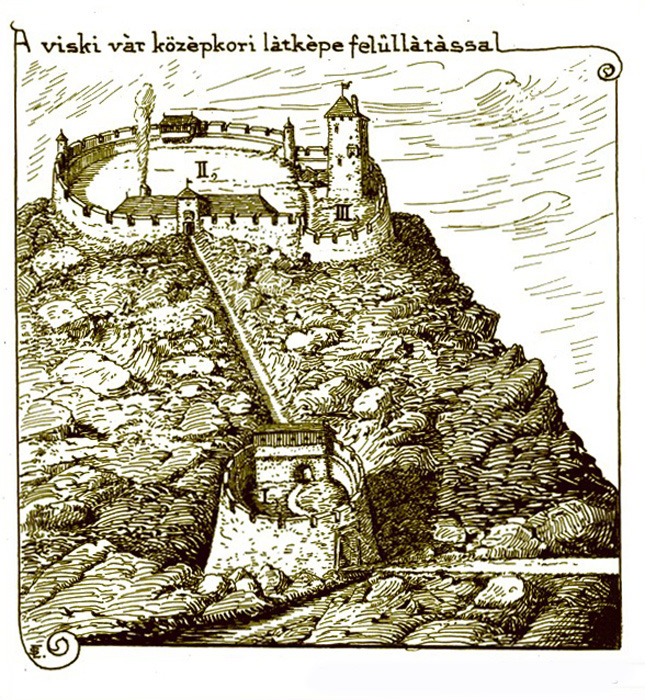
Reconstruction drawing of Visk Castle (today ruins in Vyshkovo, Ukraine)

During Lodomer's episcopate, Ladislaus IV donated the land of Örmény (a former borough of Esztergom) to the Order of Saint Augustine in 1281, where they established a monastery and conducted theological and artistic studies. The land donation was confirmed by Andrew III in his letter of coronation oath. In 1283, Ladislaus permitted that those nobles who died without legitimate heirs, could leave their fortune to the Esztergom Basilica. Additionally, the king granted the privilege of the exemption from mining income to the archdiocese and its chapter. The king placed the castle warriors of Pat under the jurisdiction of Lodomer in 1284. In 1288, Ladislaus obliged the traders, who arrived from Regensburg and Vienna, to pay custom to the chapter of Esztergom, when passing through the city. However there were several reports, that the traders avoided Esztergom and took their goods directly into Buda. As a result, Lodomer excommunicated some merchants in the next year. He had also conflicts with those butchers, who relocated their slaughterhouses from Esztergom in order to avoid paying the duty. After 1282, Ladislaus IV donated several lands to the Archdiocese of Esztergom: Óny in Pozsony County (1283), Szakállas (present-day a borough of Kameničná, Slovakia) in 1285, while Queen Isabella donated Billeg in Komárom County (today a borough of Naszály) in 1284. After their confrontation in the next year, Ladislaus IV did not donate any more property to the archdiocese and Lodomer. Beside the monarch, secular nobles also donated lands to the archdiocese under Lodomer. For instance, Bartholomew Szemere bequeathed his estate Guta with two fishponds (in Komárom County, today Kolárovo, Slovakia) in 1281. Royal donations reappeared after 1290, when Andrew III ascended the Hungarian throne. Andrew III donated the village Nándor in Esztergom County but without the local conditional nobles (to avoid conflict) upon Lodomer's request in 1291. After his coronation, Andrew III donated several landholdings to his ally Lodomer, including the town of Rozsnyóbánya (present-day Rožňava in Slovakia) with its revenues of silver mine (urbura) in 1291, on the grounds that Bernold von Tellesbrunn caused damage of 20,000 marks to the archdiocese during the 1291 Austrian–Hungarian war. He was also granted the village of Mocsa in Komárom County by Queen Fenenna in the same year, for the celebration of her coronation.

There is no record that Lodomer ever bought a landholding during his episcopate, unlike his predecessors, but exchanged estates ten times, according to the contemporary records. Historian Péter Kis considers Lodomer's unusually more active role in the secular domestic politics caused significant additional expenditure to the archbishopric. In addition, due to the conditions of feudal anarchy in the second half of the 13th century, the income sources of the archdiocese dwindled. During Lodomer's appointment, the city of Esztergom has not paid tithes to the chapter for two years. The archdiocese was also suffered from acts of domination. In the 1280s, a neighboring lord, Thomas Hont-Pázmány (son of Abraham, from the clan's Szentgyörgyi branch) constantly plundered the estates of the archbishopric, unlawfully confiscating its revenues and tithes. According to an estimation, he caused a damage of altogether 3000 marks with his raids. With the intercession of the powerful oligarch Matthew III Csák, Lodomer had to settle for 300 marks of silver compensation. Sometime before 1287, Thomas and his brother Abraham also handed over the estate Gyorok in Nyitra County (today a borough of Nové Zámky, Slovakia) to the archdiocese as part of the compensation. Since the former archbishop Philip Türje was robbed at his coronation, Ladislaus IV compensated the loss of the archdiocese at that time, donating the estate Szakállas in 1285. As a compensation for previous damages, Lodomer acquired the castle of Visk (today Vyshkovo, Ukraine) from the sons of James Cseszneki. He obtained the estate Nevelen in Nógrád County in a similar manner from the Hont-Pázmány kindred, as a compensation for the pillaging of Vadkert. He also acquired portion in Úrkuta in Esztergom County in 1292 from Apor Péc, who also caused damage to the archbishop's holdings. The Rátóts pillaged 11 villages of the archdiocese in the early 1290s. As a result, Andrew III confiscated their estate Kemence in Hont County and donated it to Lodomer in 1293. The Hont-Pázmánys (sons of Casimir) looted 15 archiepiscopal estates around the same time. Therefore, vice-judge royal Martin persuaded them to hand over the estates Bény and Kéménd (today Bíňa and Kamenín in Slovakia, respectively) in 1295. However, Ugrin Hont-Pázmány was only willing to give up the latter estate.

The acquisition and sale of landholdings were consciously organized: Lodomer expanded his influence over the territories in Esztergom, Komárom and Nyitra (Nitra) counties that surrounded his seat in Esztergom in order to defend the archbishopric's interests against the neighboring powerful lords during the era of anarchy. Lodomer sought to create a coherent lordship through property exchanges. In 1280, he exchanged portion in Hetény (today Chotín in Slovakia) for Födémes and Szőlős in Komárom County with his confidant Mikó Szécs. In the same year, he was involved in a transaction with Andrew Hatvani too, exchanging the estate Levancstelki in Nógrád County for portions in Hatvan (today Palotás). Lodomer also acquired Farnad in Esztergom County (today Farná, Slovakia) for two portions (Lócsa and Porosztolnok) in the lordship of Saskő (today Šášovský hrad in Slovakia) in Bars County and 70 marks with the same method from Thomas and Orbász Báncsa in 1283. Before his death, Matthew II Csák bequeathed the estate Béla in Komárom County to the archbishopric, but John, son of Paul, former ban of Macsó seized the village, causing a damage of 100 marks to Lodomer. As a compensation, John and his brothers handed over portions in Födémes in Nyitra County to the archbishopric. In 1284, Lodomer returned the estates to them in exchange for Béla. Lodomer also exchanged the acquired Gyorok for Bogdány in Komárom County and 200 marks with the Hont-Pázmány clan in 1287. Lodomer exchanged portions in Örmény for Újváros (boroughs within Esztergom) with his own cathedral chapter in 1289. According to the document, the archbishop wanted to establish a mill and gardens there. In 1294, Lodomer was granted a portion in the village of Búcs in Esztergom County (today Búč, Slovakia) from the Tengerdi family in exchange for his fortified manor in the northern part of Margaret Island. In 1295, Benedict Rád, the bishop of Veszprém renounced the tithes due to him in the villages Háros, Födémes, Csút and Kocsola in favor of the provost of Csút (in present-day Budafok). In exchange, Benedict was granted Csát in Tolna County along with 17 possessions in Somogy County by Lodomer, who, thus, received Nyárhíd with its toll in Nyitra County (today a borough of Nové Zámky). Lodomer expanded this estate, when acquired another portion from Ernye Hont-Pázmány, who, in exchange, obtained Surány in Nyitra County (today Šurany, Slovakia) in 1297. In that year, the archbishop also exchanged Prácsa in Pozsony County (today Vajnory, a borough of Bratislava, Slovakia) for Tardoskedd with its fair in Nyitra County (today Tvrdošovce, Slovakia). Still in the end of 1297, Lodomer exchanged his estates Püspöki and Velkenye (today Vlkyňa, Slovakia) in Gömör County for Szakácsi and Udal in Bars County with Dominic Rátót, in order to establish a coherent lordship in that county too.

Adapting to the new situation, Lodomer was the first archbishop, who established an ecclesiastical familia, through which he could exercise his military and political influence. There are some data about the Nobles of the Church, the personnel of his court in Esztergom; his first identified bailiff was Pasca of Cseke (mentioned in 1280), who soon was replaced by Maurice Vázsony, Lodomer's relative around 1284. A certain Andrew Ajka was referred to as the archiepiscopal court's palatine in 1291, while Michael of Mencshely was styled as "master of the bakers" (Latin: magister paniferorum). A third member, Stephen, son of Fulkus was a castle warrior in Komárom Castle, who joined Lodomer's court "with his estates and privileges" in 1284 in order to protect his wealth against the oligarchs. He was granted the "conditional noble" status. The lands of his servants and soldiers laid in Bars and Hont counties along the estates of the archdiocese to perform their defense function against the eastward attacks from the powerful Transdanubian oligarchs, primarily Matthew III Csák and the Kőszegi brothers, while the familial lands with looser structure in Komárom and Pozsony counties existed with the aim to support potential westward royal campaigns against the provincial lords.

== Sources ==
- Beke, Margit (2003). "Monoszló nembeli Lodomér [Lodomer from the kindred Monoszló]". In Beke, Margit (ed.). Esztergomi érsekek 1001–2003 [Archbishops of Esztergom 1001–2003] (in Hungarian). Szent István Társulat. pp. 128–134. ISBN 963-361-472-4.
- Berend, Nora (2001). At the Gate of Christendom: Jews, Muslims and "Pagans" in Medieval Hungary, c. 1000-c.1300. Cambridge University Press. ISBN 978-0-521-02720-5.
- Engel, Pál (2001). The Realm of St Stephen: A History of Medieval Hungary, 895–1526. I.B. Tauris Publishers. ISBN 1-86064-061-3.
- Gerics, József (1987). A korai rendiség Európában és Magyarországon [The Early Society of Estates in Europe and Hungary] (in Hungarian). Akadémiai Kiadó. ISBN 963-05-4218-8.
- Homonnai, Sarolta (2003). "Lodomér esztergomi érsek [Lodomer, Archbishop of Esztergom]". In Szentpéteri, József (ed.). Szürke eminenciások a magyar történelemben (in Hungarian). Kossuth Kiadó. pp. 16–19. ISBN 963-09-4499-5.
- Hunyadi, Sándor (2023). "Lodomér esztergomi érsek birtokszervezői tevékenysége [The Land Managing Activities of Archbishop Lodomer of Esztergom]". In Hunyadi, Sándor; et al. (eds.). Micae Mediaevales XI (in Hungarian). Eötvös Loránd University. pp. 53–66. ISSN 2062-2198.
- Hunyadi, Sándor (2024). "Lodomér esztergomi érsek politikai pályájának egyes vonatkozásai. A királyi hatalom és a főpapi igények kérdése az 1290. évi törvények tükrében [Aspects of the political career of Archbishop Lodomér of Esztergom. The question of royal power and ecclesiastical demands in the light of the 1290 laws.]". Belvedere Meridionale (in Hungarian). 36 (2): 54–70. ISSN 1419-0222.
- Kis, Péter (2000). "Az esztergomi érsekek uradalomszervezése a XIII. század második felében [The Organization of Lordships by the Archbishops of Esztergom in the Second Half of the 13th Century]". In Piti, Ferenc; Szabados, György (eds.). "Magyaroknak eleiről". Ünnepi tanulmányok a hatvan esztendős Makk Ferenc tiszteletére (in Hungarian). Szegedi Középkorász Műhely. pp. 225–248. ISBN 963-482-500-1.
- Körmendi, Tamás (2016). "Lodomér pályafutása váradi püspöksége előtt [The Career of Lodomer Before His Episcopate of Várad]". In Zsoldos, Attila (ed.). Nagyvárad és Bihar az Árpád-kor végén (Tanulmányok Biharország történetéből 3.) (in Hungarian). Varadinum Kulturális Alapítvány. pp. 83–99. ISBN 978-973-0-21419-2.
- Rudolf, Veronika (2023). Közép-Európa a hosszú 13. században [Central Europe in the Long 13th Century] (in Hungarian). Arpadiana XV., Research Centre for the Humanities. ISBN 978-963-416-406-7.
- Szovák, Kornél (1991). "Lodomér érsek leveleiről [Concerning the Letters of Archbishop Lodomer]". In Bárdos, István; Beke, Margit (eds.). Egyházak a változó világban (in Hungarian). József Attila Megyei Könyvtár. pp. 141–143. ISBN 963-7631-453.
- Szűcs, Jenő (2002). Az utolsó Árpádok [The Last Árpáds] (in Hungarian). Osiris Kiadó. ISBN 963-389-271-6.
- Zsoldos, Attila (2003). "III. András". In Szovák, Kornél; Szentpéteri, József; Szakács, Margit (eds.). Szent István és III. András [Saint Stephen and Andrew III] (in Hungarian). Kossuth Kiadó. pp. 119–227. ISBN 963-09-4461-8.
- Zsoldos, Attila (2011). Magyarország világi archontológiája, 1000–1301 [Secular Archontology of Hungary, 1000–1301] (in Hungarian). História, MTA Történettudományi Intézete. ISBN 978-963-9627-38-3.

Political offices
| Preceded by Benedict | Vice-chancellor of the Junior King; 1264–1266 | Succeeded by Peter Monoszló |
Catholic Church titles
| Preceded by Zosimus | Bishop of Várad; 1268–1279 | Succeeded by Thomas |
| Preceded by Nicholas Kán & Peter Kőszegi (elected) | Archbishop of Esztergom; 13 June 1279 – 2 January 1298 | Succeeded by Gregory Bicskei (elected) |
