= Philip III (bishop of Fermo) =

Italian prelate

Philip
- Bishop of Fermo
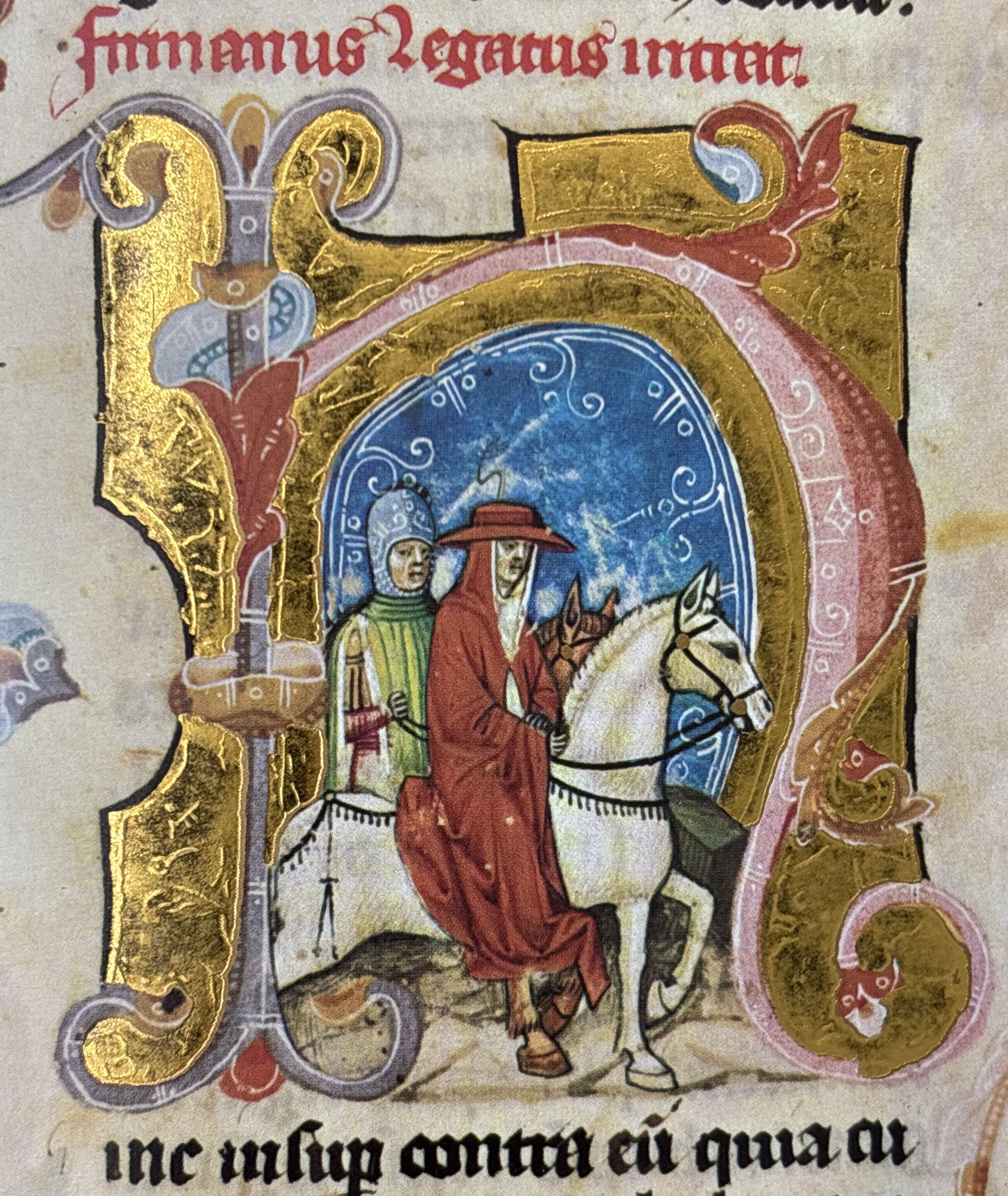
- The arrival of papal legate Philip to the Kingdom of Hungary in early 1279, as depicted in the mid-14th century Illuminated Chronicle
- Installed: 24 March 1273
- Term ended: 1300 or 1301
- Predecessor: Gerard
- Successor: Alberico Visconti
- Other post: Provost of Mantua

Personal details
- Died: 1300 or 1301
- Denomination: Roman Catholic

Philip (Italian: Filippo; died in 1300 or 1301) was an Italian prelate in the 13th century, who served as Bishop of Fermo from 1273 until his death.

Pope Nicholas III appointed him papal legate to Hungary, Poland and the neighboring lands in late 1278, to help King Ladislaus IV of Hungary restore royal power. His activity between 1279 and 1281 – mostly regarding the persecution of the Cumans – significantly interfered in Hungarian domestic politics and, contrary to his original mandate and intent, contributed to the deepening of feudal anarchy and the suppression of royal power against the emerging oligarchs.

== Bishop of Fermo ==
His origin, studies and early career are unknown. Polish historian Kazimierz Gołąb incorrectly identified him with "Philippus comes de Casate", an alleged deacon of Milan and papal chaplain, combining his person with the future cardinal Comes Glusiano de Casate based on a misunderstanding of the address of a papal letter (see below) to both of them in 1278. Nevertheless, Polish historiography accepted Gołąb's claim. Based on his knowledge of canon law, it is possible he attended the University of Bologna. Prior to his episcopate, Philip served as Provost of Mantua. He is addressed by Pope Gregory X as bishop-elect of Fermo in a letter of 24 March 1273, which describes the circumstances of his election by six of the canons of the cathedral chapter. His election was confirmed by Pope Gregory on that day.

On 31 March 1278, Pope Nicholas III entrusted Philip and Comes de Casate to carry out visits to monasteries, hospitals, churches and chapels under his direct papal jurisdiction in Rome. In March 1280, Pope Nicholas informed Philip – who resided Hungary by then – that he asserted the right of appointment for the vacant diocese of Modena and offered him the position and his transfer from Fermo to Modena in his absence. Philip, however, wished to remain the less significant Bishop of Fermo and held this dignity until his death. Philip was probably counting on his creation as cardinal, which motivated him to refuse the post. After his return from Eastern Europe to Italy, Philip kept a low profile and devoted the last years of his life to the improvement of the administration of the Diocese of Fermo: for instance, by introducing the office of vicar general and raising church discipline to a higher level. The content of these measures was primarily pastoral work, and not political sphere, which was clearly relegated to the background.

He died after a long illness in 1300 or 1301. His successor Alberico Visconti was transferred to the see by Pope Boniface VIII on 28 February 1301.

== Papal legate ==
=== Appointment ===
Since, because his manner of life was Cuman and not Catholic, the legate of the Apostolic See, Philip of Fermo arrived against him [Ladislaus IV] and demanded that the shaving of the beard and the cutting of the hair in a manner contrary to Hungarian custom, and the wearing of Cuman caps which was now a habit in Hungary, should be abandoned. He also commanded the king under pain of excommunication that he should hate the heathen, love the Christian rites and respect the marriage-bed. But having effected nothing with the king, he returned home.

— Illuminated Chronicle

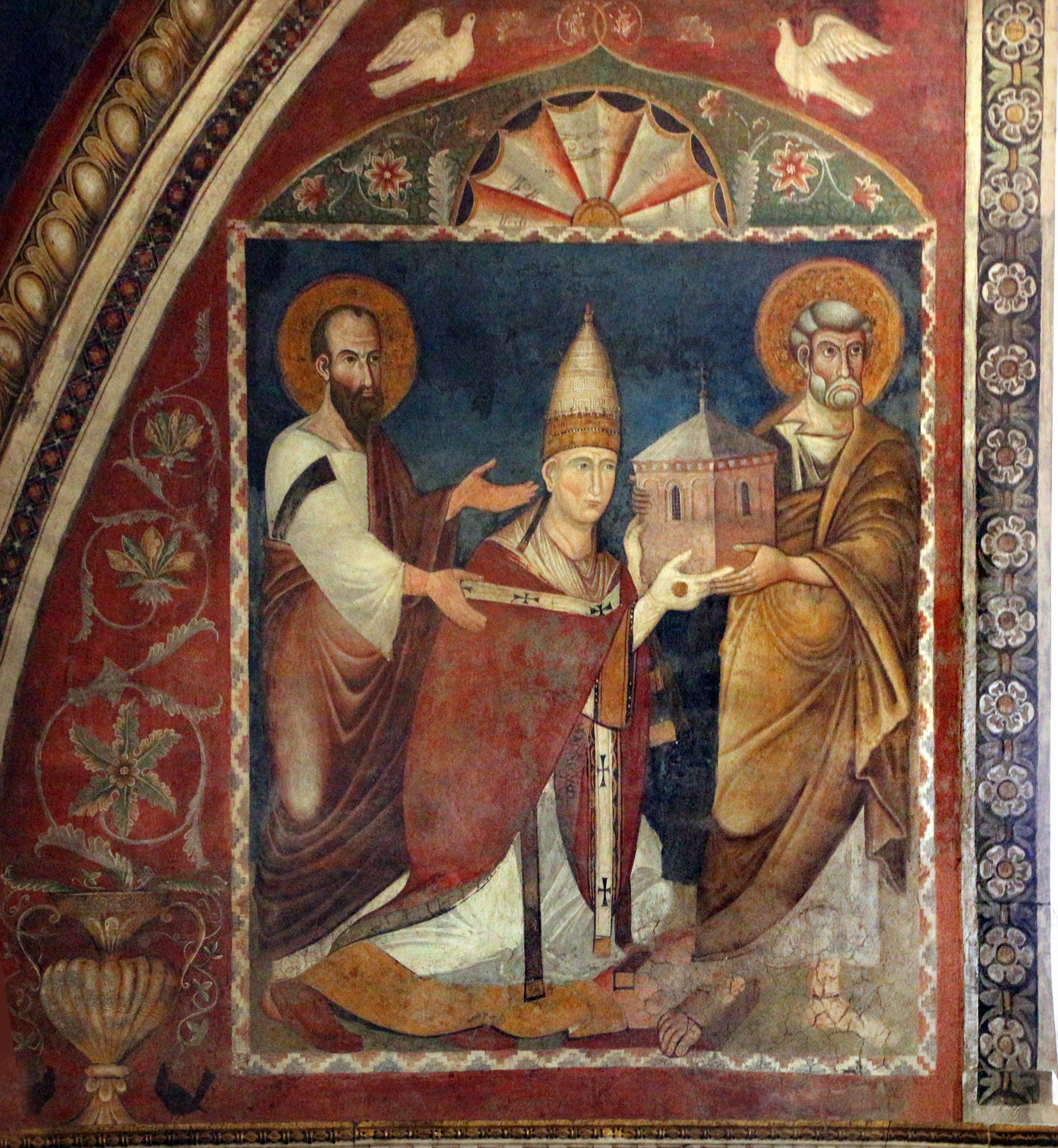
13th century fresco depicting Pope Nicholas III

Pope Nicholas III appointed Philip as papal legate with "full jurisdiction" (legationis officio plene) to Hungary and its adjacent territories, Poland, Dalmatia, Croatia, Bosnia, Serbia, Galicia–Volhynia and Cumania ("ac Polonie, Dalmatie, Croatie, Rame, Servie, Lodomirie, Galitie et Cumanie partibus illi conterminis") on 22 September 1278. Despite Philip was not a member of the College of Cardinals, he was granted the rank legatus a latere, consequently he was the "alter ego" of the pope and thus possessed full plenipotentiary powers. This reflects the importance that the pope attached to the legation. Even the 14th-century Illuminated Chronicle depicts the arriving Philip with a cardinal's insignia: the illustrator could not conceive of such an important legation without the legate being a cardinal. As a result of his rank legatus a latere, Philip was mandated to donate church benefice; he could appoint his clergy as canons in any chapter; he was authorized to grant indulgence; he could also enforce the imposition of his measures with censure (i.e. excommunication, interdict and suspension), in addition to lifting those punishments. Immediately after his appointment, Philip became de facto head of the Catholic Church in Hungary and was able to convene and preside provincial and national synods. He also acted as the supreme appeals forum for church litigation cases. The pope marked his chief duty in assisting King Ladislaus IV of Hungary to consolidate his authority and restore royal power, in addition to defend the rights and freedoms of ecclesiastical institutions against tyrannical secular lords. Philip was also instructed to strive to enforce canon law in Hungary and the neighboring countries. Beyond that, one of his main tasks was to settle the situation of the Archdiocese of Esztergom, which had been sede vacante for 7 years.

The timing of sending the papal legate to Hungary can be traced back to uncertain reasons. Although, the kingdom fell into feudal anarchy in 1272, when the minor Ladislaus was crowned king, and in the following years baronial groups fought for supreme power which also affected serious damage to ecclesiastical property (for instance, the Diocese of Veszprém was ravaged and devastated in 1276), by the time Philip was appointed, Ladislaus IV had achieved significant results in the field of political consolidation: after he was declared to be of age in May 1277, he successfully eliminated the dominion of the Geregye clan, while forcing the powerful Kőszegi family to retreat temporarily. Simultaneously, the joint German–Hungarian army decisively defeated the Bohemians and killed the archenemy King Ottokar II of Bohemia at the Battle on the Marchfeld in August 1278. The 14th-century Illuminated Chronicle emphasizes that Philip came into Hungary specifically due to Ladislaus's non-Christian habits and mores, but there is no trace of this in contemporary sources before the legate's arrival, so the chronicle pointed out this reason retrospectively. Historian Jenő Szűcs argued the papal documents containing the appointment also do not mention any objectionable behavior of the king. Jenő Szűcs and Attila Zsoldos considered the Holy See revived those Gregorian aspirations, which claimed Hungary was a papal fief as Saint Stephen "received the governance and crown" from the Pope in the 11th century, as papal legate Philip declared, when he opened the national synod in Buda. Based on Ottokar aus der Gaal's Steirische Reimchronik ("Styrian Rhyming Chronicle"), historian Viktória Kovács considered the appointment of a papal legate could have been preceded by a request in Hungary. Presumably, some members of the country's ecclesiastical and secular elite were dissatisfied with the king's consolidation efforts and did not trust the monarch. Bruno von Schauenburg, the Bishop of Olomouc (and King Ottokar's advisor) in 1272 already informed Pope Gregory on the "dangerous situation" of Christianity in Hungary, for which he made the Cumans primarily responsible. According to a near-contemporary Austrian chronicle, the Continuatio Vindobonensis, Philip was sent to Hungary not just to convert the Cumans but to "recall the Christian Hungarians, who had nearly forgotten the Christian life [...] to the Catholic faith".

=== Hungary ===
Philip of Fermo traveled via the Adriatic Sea to Zadar in Dalmatia, according to the Steirische Reimchronik. He already resided in Vienna on 28 December 1278. He arrived the Kingdom of Hungary in early 1279; he issued his first known charter in the capital Buda on 28 February 1279. According to Pope Nicholas' letter, Ladislaus IV unsuccessfully tried to prevent him from crossing the Hungarian border. With the legate's mediation, Ladislaus IV concluded a peace treaty with the rebellious Kőszegis and their familiares in March 1279. Philip considered this development as a successful completion of his political task, because of his "lack of information in good faith".

==== Church affairs ====
Pope Nicholas III mentioned in a 7 October 1278 letter that Catholics had disappeared from the Diocese of Cumania (or Milkovia) because no bishop lived there since the destruction of the episcopal see during the Mongol invasion of Hungary. The pope urged Philip to investigate the situation in the former bishopric. Already in December 1278, when he was still in Vienna, Philip confirmed several former letters of donation of King Andrew II of Hungary and former popes to the Teutonic Order regarding their claim in Burzenland (Barcaság) in Transylvania, which reflect the fact that the expulsion of Teutonic Knights from Hungary was still on the agenda in papal diplomacy. In May 1280, the community (universitas) of the Transylvanian Saxons requested Philip to lift interdict which was imposed to their lands because of the Saxon rebellion and destruction of the Diocese of Transylvania in 1277; he was willing to do so on the condition of rebuilding the St. Michael's Cathedral, the bishop's palace and chapel. Around the same time, Philip also excused brothers Mikod and Emeric Kökényesradnót from their oath to make a pilgrimage to the Holy Land, in exchange to finance the reconstruction of the cathedral.

The archiepiscopal see of Esztergom was virtually sede vacante since the death of Philip Türje in late 1272. Filling the position has become one of the battlegrounds of the feudal anarchy that began this year. By the time of the arrival of papal legate Philip, two representatives of the rival baronial groups, Nicholas Kán and Peter Kőszegi fought for the position. Pope Nicholas III summoned both of them to the Roman Curia in January 1278, but they refused to attend. On 1 June 1278, Pope Nicholas wished to appoint the archbishop himself in accordance with the canon law and declared the see of Esztergom vacant, ordering a new election. Nicholas Kán ignored the pope's decision and continued to style himself as archbishop-elect, as a result he was excommunicated. Philip was willing to release Nicholas from the excommunication in May 1279, if he resign from the title, return the usurped lands and treasures, and leave Hungary for a pilgrimage to Rome. With the contribution of Philip, Pope Nicholas III appointed Lodomer as the new Archbishop of Esztergom on 13 June 1279. On the same day, the pope instructed Philip to investigate the circumstances and regularity of the election of John Hont-Pázmány as the Archbishop of Kalocsa, which took place in the previous year. Subsequently, Philip refused to confirm the election of Thomas as the Bishop of Várad (successor of Lodomer), because he was not ordained priest within a year after his election as provost of Vasvár despite the regulation of the Second Council of Lyon (1274). The chapter of Várad successfully demonstrated that the rule applied only to the provosts of pastoral chapters, while Vasvár was a collegiate chapter. There were also uncertainties around the election of Gerard, the provost of Buda, who replaced John Hont-Pázmány in this position. For unknown reasons, Philip refused to confirm his election and sent the case to the Holy See. Years later, in November 1282, Pope Martin IV commissioned Comes de Casate, the Cardinal-Priest of SS. Marcellinus and Petrus to investigate the affair.

In the midst of adoption of the so-called Cuman laws (see below), Philip convened a national synod attending all prelates of the realm – archbishops Lodomer, John Hont-Pázmány and their suffragans – to Buda in September 1279. By the time, the relationship between Ladislaus and the papal legate became tense because of the Cuman question: the Hungarian monarch tried to prevent the ecclesiastical council from being held. Accordingly, he instructed Walter, the judge of Buda and the burghers not to allow the prelates gathering for the synod to enter the castle and not to feed them and their entourage (familiae eorumdem). However, the people of Buda did not want to embroil into conflict with the Holy See, thus Bishop Philip kept the council undisturbed, which was ended on 14 September 1279. The synod of Buda settled the internal affairs of the church in Hungary. Its regulations covered all strata of the ecclesiastical society, regulated their duties, behavior, and dress. They dealt with ecclesiastical judiciary, the application and observance of canon law, the increase of the authority of the Catholic Church, and the imposition of ecclesiastical punishments against those who violate the freedom of the church and the privileges and immunity of ecclesiastical persons from secular judicial courts. Upon Philip's request, the synod also prescribed restrictive measures against non-Christian subjects: Jews were obliged to wear a red circular patch over their breast on the left side of their outer garment, Muslims a similar sign in yellow. The synod also prescribed that any Christian transacting business with a Jew or Muslim not so marked, or living in a house or on land together with any Jews and Muslims, should be refused admittance to the Church services, and that a Christian entrusting any office to a Jew or Muslim should be excommunicated.

Philip was mandated to donate church benefice. He appointed several parishioners and rectors during his tenure as papal legate. In August 1282, after his departure, Pope Martin IV permitted King Ladislaus to exercise his right of patronage without interference in those churches, where Philip formerly had appointed office-holders, which suggests there may have been clashes over certain appointments between the monarch and the papal legate. Philip's mandate allowed him to appoint fifteen clerics of his legate's court to any chapters, whether or not he has exercised this right is unknown. According to historian Elemér Mályusz, this right partly contributed to the rise of foreign clergy in Hungary. Upon the request of the collegiate chapter of Szepes in February 1279, Philip confirmed the enactment of Matthias Hermán, a late provost of Szepes to create the positions of officers of the chapter (lector, cantor and custos). During his tenure as papal legate between 1279 and 1281, Philip functioned as the supreme ecclesiastical court of appeal in Hungary. He judged over various lawsuits regarding disputes of jurisdiction to collect tithes, for instance in Kalderbach in Szepes County between the Szepes chapter and the Virgin Mary parish church in Szepesváralja (today Spišské Podhradie, Slovakia). He also investigated the case, when Timothy, Bishop of Zagreb excommunicated the residents of the queenly estates Virovitica and Lipovac (present-day a borough of Gradina) refused to pay tithe to the Diocese of Zagreb in 1280. Following the verdict of his protege Archbishop Lodomer, Philip confirmed the privilege of the monastery of nuns located in the valley of Veszprém to collect local tithe, which was unlawfully usurped by Bishop Peter Kőszegi. In June 1281, he transcribed and confirmed the foundation charter of the Premonstratensian abbey of Turóc, issued by King Béla IV of Hungary in 1251.

==== The Cuman question ====
Shortly after his arrival to Hungary, papal legate Philip was shocked at the presence of thousands of pagan Cumans in the kingdom. Thereafter, Philip marked as his main political-diplomatic task in persuading King Ladislaus IV to withdraw support from the Cumans and in converting them into Christianity. Cumans were important militarily to the royal authority and political stability: disturbing the cause of the Cumans in this way was neither timely nor desirable, as the impatient and violent action of the papal legate in order to convert the Cumans to Christianity and end their nomadic traditions threatened this strategic alliance. On 23 June 1279, Philip convened an assembly to Buda with the participation of the monarch, barons and prelates of the realm, and the Cumans' two chieftains, Usuk and Tolon. During the meeting, the papal legate extracted a ceremonious promise from the Cuman chieftains of giving up their pagan customs, and persuaded the young King Ladislaus to swear an oath to enforce the keeping of the Cuman chieftains' promise. The monarch vowed to settle the Cumans to permanent settlements, to end their violence against Christians, and to return the church and secular estates occupied by the Cumans to their owners. Philip summoned a general assembly (generalis congregatio) to Tétény (today a borough of Budapest) in July 1279, where further laws were set down on 5 or 10 August 1279. In accordance with the legate's demand, the text again prescribed that the Cumans should leave their tents and live "in houses attached to the ground". In addition, the laws recorded the place of the final settlement of the Cumans between the Maros (Mureș) and Körös (Criș) rivers, along the rivers Tisza and Körös, in addition the land between the rivers Temes (Timiș) and Maros, establishing the autonomous Kunság. The charter also stated that the Cuman lords and nobles enjoy the same liberty as the other nobles of the country, are similarly exempt from uninvited accommodation of the royal court, and are obliged to go to war in person as they are at the king's call. Philip was empowered to send investigators (the local bishop, a baron and two local noblemen) to each Cuman tribes (or clans), whose function was to supervise the enforcement of the Cuman law, whilst the Hungarian monarch would hold seven hostages from each clans as an assurance.

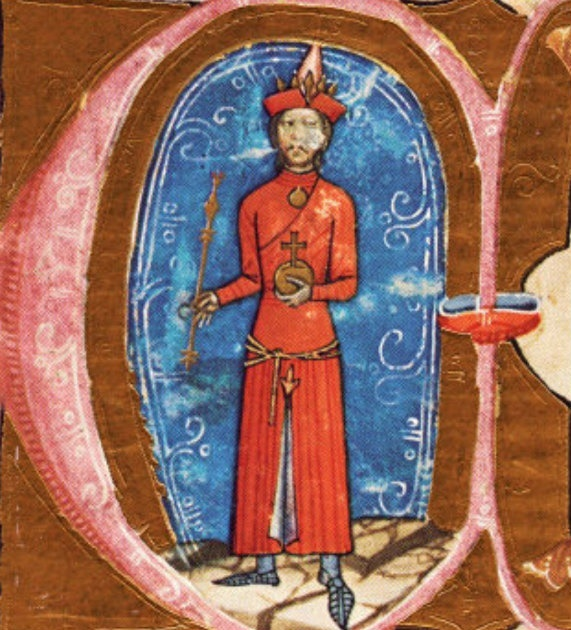
Ladislaus IV in traditional Cuman attire, depicted in Illuminated Chronicle

Some historians considered the 23 June 1279 regulations as the First Cuman Law, while others – e.g. Jenő Szűcs – argued it contained only a "draft" or the legate's dictations for the only Cuman law, a second text as the only binding law issued on 5 or 10 August 1279. András Pálóczi Horváth referred to the August regulations as the Second Cuman Law. Gyula Pauler argued, after the promulgation of the first text, the king and the Cumans managed to persuade Philip to change some of its requirements, and so the second text was promulgated, superseding the first. Pálóczi Horváth considered the attending Cuman chieftains – Alpra and Uzur – managed to obtain certain compromises, as the second document also contained their privileges beside their obligations. In contrast, Nora Berend argued the first text (23 June) is the only authentic binding law, while the second text (5 or 10 August), which contained the Kunság as a separate political entity within the county system, is an 18th-century forgery: accordingly, it was produced to justify ancient liberties against normative pressures. Other scholars believe that the document is a reasonably faithful copy of King Ladislaus' writ, with only some modifications.

Historian Jenő Szűcs considered the rise of Cuman question were made "artificially", which proved to be "fatal", which upset the delicate balance between the monarch, the Hungarian barons and prelates, and the Cumans. Their persecution ultimately shattered the foundations of internal consolidation, which has achieved results in the previous two years. Szűcs emphasized the bishops were forced to bow their heads before Philip's "authoritarian violence", some of the nobility was defeated by demagoguery, and the rebellion matured among the Cumans. Consequently, the young king drifted into an unresolved conflict situation at once: if he did not want to get into a vacuum, one of his choices was worse than the other. For Ladislaus IV, fulfilling the papal will would have been a political suicide. Much of it may have been due to the military power of the Cumans who were stably behind him, and the settlement and Christianization of the Cumans would naturally have led to its loss. At the same time, "the denial of the ecclesiastical will, on the other hand, meant embracing exclusion from the Christian world, which was also tantamount to the complete impossibility of exercising power."

Implementation of the laws was delayed, however, because the commoners from the Cuman tribes did not obey the laws, and Ladislaus IV, himself a half-Cuman, failed to force them, despite his oath that he would even start a war against the Cumans if the law was sabotaged. In retaliation, Bishop Philip excommunicated him and some of his strongest allies, for instance Nicholas Kán, and placed Hungary under interdict in early October 1279. According to Nora Berend, Ladislaus' behaviour shifted the focus from Hungary's non-Christians to the king's person during the conflict, even though Ladislaus was himself a Christian. After the proclamation of the ecclesiastical censure, the king was forced to retreat and promise again to enforce the Cuman law in the first half of the month. The confrontation caused a rift within the baronial elite, which led to the reorganization of the royal council, while the prelates submitted themselves to the will of the Holy See, even though the restoration of royal power was in their best interests. However, reconciliation between Ladislaus and Philip proved to be only temporary, and the Hungarian monarch left the capital for Semlak in Temes County (Tiszántúl) and settled among the Cumans, finally choosing the latter in his intractable dilemma. Two clerics, former archbishop-elect Nicholas Kán and Gregory, the Grand Provost of Esztergom joined him, possibly along with other faithful courtiers. Ladislaus IV even appealed to the Holy See, but the pope refused to absolve him from the excommunication. On 9 December 1279, Pope Nicholas III sent a letter to the king, in which he rebuked him for his resistance and for his pagan customs and Cuman concubines (thus Aydua, the most famous of them). The pope also sent letters to all barons, prelates and churches of the realm in which he called for support for the policies of papal legate Philip.

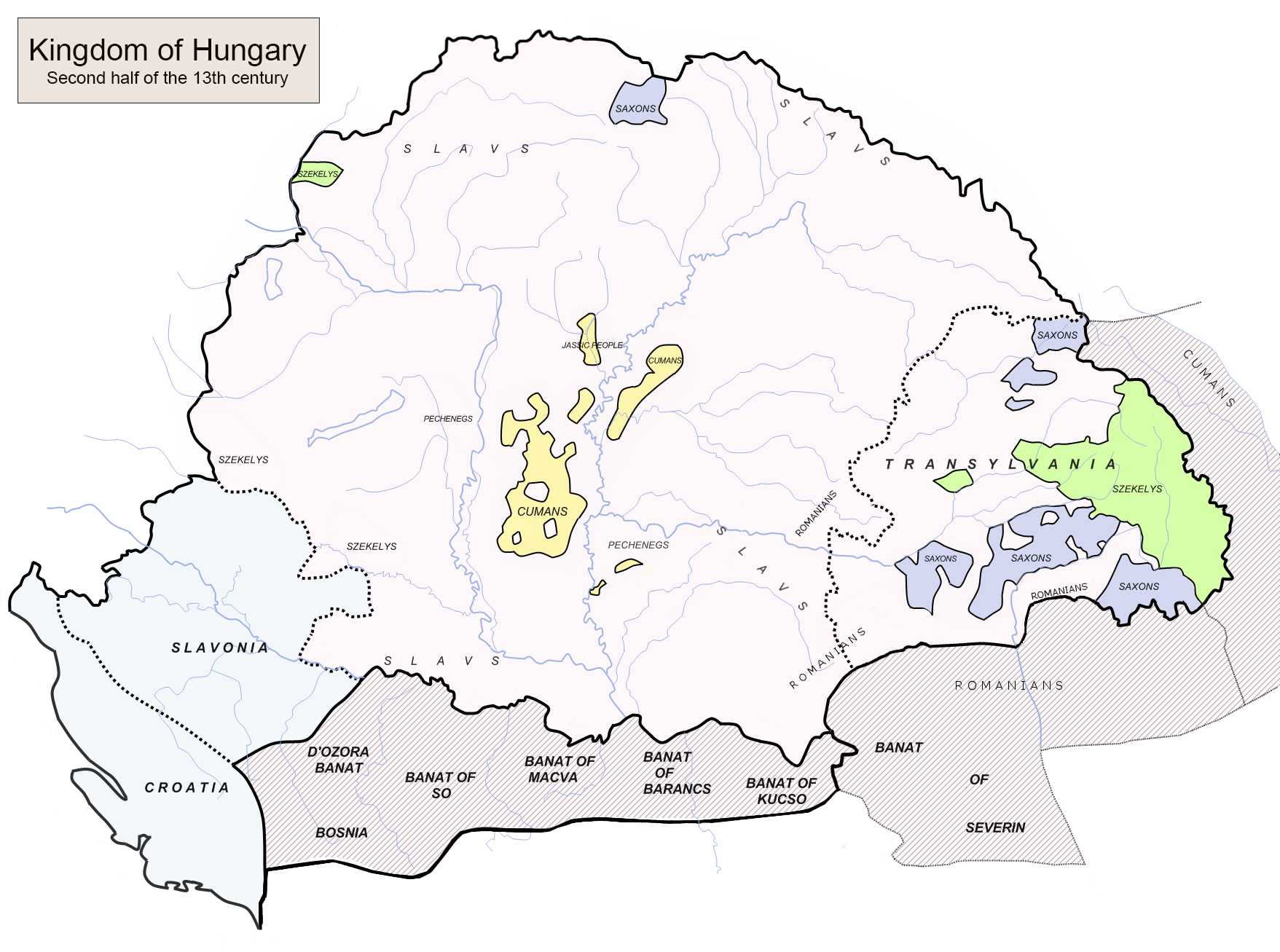
Local Cuman autonomies (yellow) following the adoption of the Cuman laws in 1279–1280

By that time, Nicholas Kán fell ill and fled the entourage of the king (before that, Gregory was already murdered). Feeling of impending death, he confessed his sins and requested his family to take his corpse before the papal legate. After his death, Philip ordered to bury him in the cemetery of the lepers in Buda, where his corpse was stoned, as his excommunication had not been released. Ladislaus was enraged by the incident and his confidants captured and imprisoned Philip of Fermo in late December 1279 or early January 1280. Thereafter, Ladislaus handed over the legate to the Cumans. The Steirische Reimchronik preserved that the Cumans "took him [Philip] to the place where they used to shoot with an arrow, they wanted to shoot arrow into him and shed his blood". This escalation completely alienated the Hungarian lords from the monarch: as a result, they – under the leadership of Palatine Matthew Csák – decided to imprison the king. Sometime after 17 January 1280, when Ladislaus stayed in Beszterce near Transylvania (present-day Bistrița, Romania), Voivode of Transylvania Finta Aba captured Ladislaus and handed him over to Roland Borsa, who held the king in custody. Both parties corresponded abroad in order to resolve the conflict. Upon the request of Charles I of Sicily, Pope Nicholas III sent his envoys to Hungary. As a result, both the legate and the king were set free within a month, in February 1280. Subsequently, Paschasius, the Provost of Pressburg (today Bratislava, Slovakia) mediated the peace between Ladislaus and Philip. The Steirische Reimchronik incorrectly claims that immediately after his liberation, Philip left Hungary for Italy, and "arriving to Zadar, he swore to God that the king and all of his men could become a pagan from his apart, he would no longer set foot on Hungarian soil". Ladislaus IV took a new oath to enforce the Cuman laws.

For the rest of his tenure as papal legate, Philip was no longer actively involved in the political affairs of the kingdom, but the escalation of the Cuman question had long-lasting consequences for the history of Hungary. Many Cumans decided to leave Hungary instead of obeying the legate's demands. This fundamentally endangered the effectiveness of the Hungarian military capability. Ladislaus gathered an army around October 1280 and chased the outgoing Cumans as far as Szalánkemén (now Stari Slankamen in Serbia) and also crossed the border at the Carpathians. Ladislaus IV successfully persuaded the Cumans to return to Hungary during the military campaign to Transalpina under unknown circumstances. Two years later, however, rebellion broke out around July 1282 among the Cumans who were forced to return earlier. They looted and pillaged the region between the rivers Tisza and Maros. This conflict elevated into the Battle of Lake Hód in September or October 1282. András Pálóczi Horváth emphasized the Cumans' defeat at Lake Hód resulted "a reduction in the Cuman population in Hungary, and with this their economic and military strength was also greatly diminished", which highly affected the efficiency of the royal authority. Royal power completely collapsed for the remaining part of Ladislaus' reign, while the oligarchs began to administer their provinces independently of the king. The era of feudal anarchy lasted until the 1320s.

=== Poland ===
Before his departure to Silesia, Philip already dealt with Polish affairs, while resided in Hungary. For instance, in May 1280, he confirmed the privileges of the diocese of Kruszwica and Włocławek, as well as the privileges of the Cistercian abbey of Wąchock in October 1280. Pope Nicholas entrusted Philip to confirm the election of local canon Włościbor as the new Archbishop of Gniezno in December 1279, despite Philip formerly referred the matter to the Holy See due to his busy schedule in Hungary. Sometime later (before December 1281), archbishop-elect Włościbor resigned from his position before the presence of Philip. Historian Gyula Pauler claimed that Philip traveled to Silesia for a while in June 1281, where he convened a synod in Włocławek in July 1281. Vilmos Fraknói considered the provisions of the council were one by one in line with the resolutions of the 1279 council of Buda. Viktória Kovács argued there is no trace of the convening of the hypothetical synod in the sources, nor of the legate's stay in Poland at this time.

In fact, Philip left Hungary sometime after 6 September 1281. According to the Annales Polonorum, his departure was not voluntary: "the king [Ladislaus IV] took him and, shaming him, put him on a chariot and brought him out of the country, because he had done much wrong to this king named Ladislaus"." On 21 October 1281, the papal legate already dated his charter from the Austrian town Hainburg an der Donau. He arrived to Silesia in the following months: he resided in Wrocław from February to April 1282, but also issued charters in Milicz, Wieluń, Henryków and Lipowa throughout the year. He unsuccessfully tried to mediate in the violent dispute between Thomas II, bishop of Wrocław and Duke Henry IV the Righteous over the prerogatives of the Church in Silesia. Philip left Poland in late summer or early autumn 1282. As a papal legate, he issued his last surviving charter in Vienna on 10 September 1282, when, upon the request of the local convent of the Teutonic Order, transcribed and confirmed that non-authentic charter of King Béla IV of Hungary allegedly from May 1244, in which the Teutonic Knights were granted lands in Nyitra County.

== Sources ==
=== Primary sources ===
- Bak, János M.; Veszprémy, László; Kersken, Norbert (2018). Chronica de gestis Hungarorum e codice picto saec. XIV [The Illuminated Chronicle: Chronicle of the deeds of the Hungarians from the fourteenth-century illuminated codex]. Budapest: Central European University Press. ISBN 978-9-6338-6264-3.

=== Secondary sources ===
- Berend, Nora (2001). At the Gate of Christendom: Jews, Muslims and "Pagans" in Medieval Hungary, c. 1000–c.1300. Cambridge University Press. ISBN 978-0-521-02720-5.
- Eubel, Konrad (1913). Hierarchia Catholica Medii Aevi (in Latin). Vol. 1. Monasterii Sumptibus et typis librariae.
- Gołąb, Kazimierz (1960). "Biskup Filip z Fermo i jego statuty legackie z 1279 r. [Bishop Philip of Fermo and his Legate Statutes from 1279]". Roczniki Historyczne (in Polish). 26. Poznań Society for the Advancement of Arts and Sciences: 255–264. ISSN 0324-8585.
- Jerzak, Norbert (2017). "Udział biskupa Filipa z Fermo we wrocławskim sporze pomiędzy biskupem Tomaszem II a księciem Henrykiem IV [The Participation of Bishop Philip of Fermo in the Wroclaw's Dispute between Bishop Thomas II and Prince Henry IV]". Wrocławski Przegląd Teologiczny (in Polish). 25 (2). Pontifical Faculty of Theology of Wrocław: 127–146. ISSN 1231-1731.
- Kovács, Viktória (2019). "Alter ego domini papae Nicolai III. Fülöp fermói püspök, szentszéki legátus magyarországi tevékenysége (1279–1281) [Alter ego domini papae Nicolai III. The Activity of Philip, Bishop of Fermo and Legate of the Holy See in Hungary (1279–1281)]". In Kiss, Gergely (ed.). Varietas delectat. A pápai–magyar kapcsolatok sokszínűsége a 11–14. században (in Hungarian). Pécsi Tudományegyetem BTK TTI Középkori és Koraújkori Történeti Tanszék. pp. 117–166. ISBN 978-963-429-394-1.
- Pálóczi Horváth, András (1989). Pechenegs, Cumans, Iasians: Steppe Peoples in Medieval Hungary. Corvina. ISBN 963-13-2740-X.
- Pauler, Gyula (1899). A magyar nemzet története az Árpád-házi királyok alatt, II. [The History of the Hungarian Nation during the Árpádian Kings, Vol. 2.] (in Hungarian). Athenaeum.
- Szűcs, Jenő (2002). Az utolsó Árpádok [The Last Árpáds] (in Hungarian). Osiris Kiadó. ISBN 963-389-271-6.
- Zsoldos, Attila (1997). "Téténytől a Hód-tóig. Az 1279 és 1282 közötti évek politikatörténetének vázlata [From Tétény to Hód Lake: Outline of the Political History of the Years Between 1279 and 1282]". Történelmi Szemle (in Hungarian). 39 (1). Hungarian Academy of Sciences: 69–98. ISSN 0040-9634.

Catholic Church titles
Preceded by Gerard	Bishop of Fermo; 1273–1300/01	Succeeded by Alberico Visconti
