= Benedict III (archbishop of Esztergom) =

Hungarian prelate

Benedict
- Archbishop-elect of Esztergom
- Installed: 22 February 1274
- Term ended: November 1276
- Predecessor: Nicholas Kán elected
- Successor: Nicholas Kán elected
- Other post: Vice-chancellor

Personal details
- Died: November 1276
- Denomination: Roman Catholic

Benedict (Hungarian: Benedek; died November 1276) was a Hungarian prelate in the second half of the 13th century, who served as Archbishop-elect of Esztergom from 1274 until his death. Previously, he held various posts in the royal chancellery.

== Early life ==
Benedict was born into an unidentified family from Zala County, whose nobility was confirmed shortly after the First Mongol invasion of Hungary. According to 19th-century clerical historian Antal Pór, he belonged to the gens Nádasd (ancestor of the wealthy Nádasdy family), while Mór Wertner identified him as a member of the Lőrinte kindred, but other historians do not share either viewpoints. Benedict had three brothers, Dedalus, ispán of Zala County (1273–1274), Beke and Stephen. When Atyusz V Atyusz was charged disloyalty by Ladislaus IV of Hungary, the king donated the Szentmiklós Castle and its surrounding villages to them in 1276, not long before Benedict's death.

In contemporary records, his name is referred to with the honorary title of "magister", demonstrating his education and skills in science. He first appears in sources in 1255–56, when participated in determination of a border along the Drava on behalf of Béla IV of Hungary. He started his ecclesiastical career in the Diocese of Pécs. Soon, he joined the court of the king's eldest son Duke Stephen, where he was mentioned as a notary in 1257. Stephen attained the age of majority in that year and became Duke of Transylvania. Two years later, he was appointed Duke of Styria, which he governed with the help of local lords and bureaucrats, who originated from near the Austrian border. Benedict elevated into the position of vice-chancellor in the ducal court by 1259, while he was also titled provost of Friesach and archdeacon of Valkó, which belonged to the Diocese of Veszprém. After Béla IV was forced to renounce of Styria in favor of Ottokar II, Stephen returned to Transylvania and started to rule it for the second time after 20 August 1260. Benedict escorted his lord to the eastern province and retained his position of vice-chancellor. He was styled as provost of Szeben (today Sibiu, Romania) from 1261 to 1262, then as provost of Arad since 1262. He held the latter clerical dignity until the end of 1273.

Stephen's relationship with Béla IV deteriorated by the early 1260s. After a brief civil war between them, Benedict of Szeben mediated the reconciliation between father and son at Pressburg (present-day Bratislava, Slovakia) in the autumn of 1262, alongside other prelates. Initially, Benedict remained loyal to the duke, but just before the emerging civil war between father and son, he escaped from Transylvania and defected to the royal court not long before October 1264. He was replaced as vice-chancellor by Lodomer still in that year. It is possible that Benedict actively participated in the conflict with his troops, as two of his familiares, brothers Simon and Synke were granted a land in Zala County in April 1265 by Béla for "their loyalty in various military campaigns".

When Stephen V succeeded his father as King of Hungary in May 1270, Béla's numerous partisans were forgiven, including Benedict, who took the role of royal vice-chancellor immediately after the death of the old monarch. He held the dignity until the sudden death of Stephen V in August 1272. In the summer of 1270, Benedict also acted as envoy sent to the Bohemian court, alongside Bás Mezőpilis. They met the envoys of Ottokar in Brno to conclude a truce. They informed Philip of Spanheim, Stephen's ally, on the truce on 2 July 1270. In August 1271, after Ottokar II invaded the lands north of the Danube and destroyed the archives of the Diocese of Nyitra (Nitra), Benedict, alongside vice-ispán Michael and Sixtus of Esztergom, were mandated by Stephen V to determine the borders of the diocese, cataloging its existing estates and churches. When Bishop Lampert Hont-Pázmány requested the monarch to transcribe and confirm his father's privilege letter for the Diocese of Eger in 1271, Benedict represented the king in the committee, which was sent to the bishopric to examine the documents and boundaries. Benedict was also a member of that delegation which was sent to Marchegg following the Bohemian–Hungarian war in 1271.

== Archbishop-elect ==
After the death of Archbishop Philip Türje in December 1272, the episcopal see of Esztergom became vacant. During the rule of the minor Ladislaus IV, the kingdom fell into constant anarchy, when many groupings of barons fought against each other for supreme power. The archbishopric of Esztergom and its revenues became an important subject of this confrontation. Nicholas Kán, Dowager Queen Elizabeth's protege arbitrarily and forcibly took the dignity in February 1273, but his election with doubtful legality was rejected by both Pope Gregory X and the majority of the canons. After Elizabeth and her league was expelled from power and lost political influence for a while around June 1273, the see was declared vacant again. Succeeding Kán, Benedict was appointed vice-chancellor again, held the dignity until his death. He was also styled as provost of Buda since the end of 1273, replacing chronicler Ákos. According to a letter of Pope John XXI, Benedict was also a member of the cathedral chapter of Esztergom.

The cathedral chapter of Esztergom elected Benedict as archbishop on 22 February 1274. According to historian Sándor Hunyadi, Benedict was elected as archbishop already in February or March 1273, but his rival Nicholas Kán took the position by force. Following the fall of Nicholas Kán, it took Benedict some time to get his validly elected status accepted by the political elite that was currently in power, which only succeeded in the beginning of 1274. Subsequently, he sent his two emissaries Roman, archdeacon of Bars and Fulcus, a canon of Esztergom to the Holy See for confirmation of his election, but they had to turn back at Senj due to recent piracy on the upper Adriatic coast. According to other opinions, they noticed that they were being followed by hostile forces – who are usually identified with the followers of Nicholas Kán – and therefore they went to Trogir instead and then turned back.

Despite the lack of official confirmation, Benedict maintained a good and regular relationship with the Roman Curia. In accordance with the resolution of the Second Council of Lyon, which drew up plans for a crusade to recover the Holy Land, Pope Gregory X sent his vice-dean Gerardus de Mutina in 1274 to Hungary to collect tithe imposed for 6 years on all the benefices of the Hungarian Catholic Church. The newly elected Pope Innocent V in 1276 entrusted cardinal Ottobuono de' Fieschi to investigate the election and the subsequent confirmation of Benedict, but the pope's sudden death and the election of Ottobuono as Pope Adrian V delayed the issue. Benedict also supported the efforts of Ladislaus IV in order to restore strong royal power. The king was trying to reward his support; for instance, he donated the St. Nicholas chapel and its right of patronage in Bana to the Dominican Order, upon the request of archbishop-elect Benedict and canon Reynold. He also confirmed the privileges of the Buda Chapter, donated by his great-grandfather Andrew II of Hungary. Ladislaus IV granted the land of Gyarmat (today Žitavce, Slovakia), belonged to Szolgagyőr Castle, to the Esztergom cathedral chapter in 1275. Following a border dispute, the archbishop divided the estate Hort along the river Garam (Hron) with the boaters of Letkés.

A contemporary record described him a "colorless person". His election was temporarily right choice from the chapter in order to avoid the penetration of the secular conflicts within the church. Benedict transferred the Tihany Abbey under the jurisdiction of the Diocese of Veszprém and its bishop Peter Kőszegi on 3 September 1276, but maintained his right as metropolitan over the monastery. In exchange, the Archdiocese of Esztergom was granted two villages called Gyermely with the tithe and chapels of the nearby Csolnok and Bille. In the end, the transfer was not realized due to Benedict's early death. He was among those prelates, who were mandated by Pope Innocent V to prepare the beatification of Margaret, daughter of Béla IV. Benedict was last mentioned by sources on 18 November 1276. He died shortly thereafter, as his rival Nicholas Kán was already referred as archbishop-elect in December 1276.

== Sources ==
- Beke, Margit (2003). "III. Benedek [Benedict III]". In Beke, Margit (ed.). Esztergomi érsekek 1001–2003 [Archbishops of Esztergom 1001–2003] (in Hungarian). Szent István Társulat. pp. 125–127. ISBN 963-361-472-4.
- Hunyadi, Sándor (2022). "Választott esztergomi érsekek az 1270-es években: Benedek és Kán nembeli Miklós [The elected archbishops of Esztergom in the 1270s: Benedek and Nicholas of the Kán kindred]". Belvedere Meridionale (in Hungarian). 34 (4): 5–17. ISSN 1419-0222.
- Kovács, István (2018). "Az aradi káptalan elöljárói: a prépostok (1135–1526) [Provosts of the Medieval Episcopal See of Arad (1135–1526)]". In Czeferner, Dóra; Böhm, Gábor; Fedeles, Tamás (eds.). Mesterek és Tanítványok 2. Tanulmányok a bölcsészet- és társadalomtudományok területéről (in Hungarian). University of Pécs. pp. 147–163. ISBN 978-963-429-223-4.
- Rudolf, Veronika (2023). Közép-Európa a hosszú 13. században [Central Europe in the Long 13th Century] (in Hungarian). Arpadiana XV., Research Centre for the Humanities. ISBN 978-963-416-406-7.
- Zsoldos, Attila (2007). Családi ügy: IV. Béla és István ifjabb király viszálya az 1260-as években [A family affair: The Conflict between Béla IV and Junior King Stephen in the 1260s] (in Hungarian). História, MTA Történettudományi Intézete. ISBN 978-963-9627-15-4.
- Zsoldos, Attila (2011). Magyarország világi archontológiája, 1000–1301 [Secular Archontology of Hungary, 1000–1301] (in Hungarian). História, MTA Történettudományi Intézete. ISBN 978-963-9627-38-3.

Political offices
Preceded by Office established	Vice-chancellor of the Junior King; 1259–1264	Succeeded by Lodomer
Preceded by Demetrius	Vice-chancellor; 1270–1272	Succeeded by Nicholas Kán
Preceded by Nicholas Kán	Vice-chancellor; 1273–1276	Succeeded by Nicholas Kán
Catholic Church titles
Preceded by Nicholas (?)	Provost of Szeben; 1261–1262	Succeeded by Theodore Tengerdi (?)
Preceded by John	Provost of Arad; 1262–1273	Succeeded by Nicholas (?)
Preceded by Ákos	Provost of Buda; 1273–1276	Succeeded by John Hont-Pázmány
Preceded by Nicholas Kán (elected)	Archbishop of Esztergom (elected); 1274–1276	Succeeded by Nicholas Kán (elected)
