= Bejc (genus) =

Bejc or Beicz (Beych or Beuch) was the name of a minor gens (Latin for "clan"; nemzetség in Hungarian) in the Kingdom of Hungary, which possessed lands in Vas County, Western Transdanubia.

== History ==
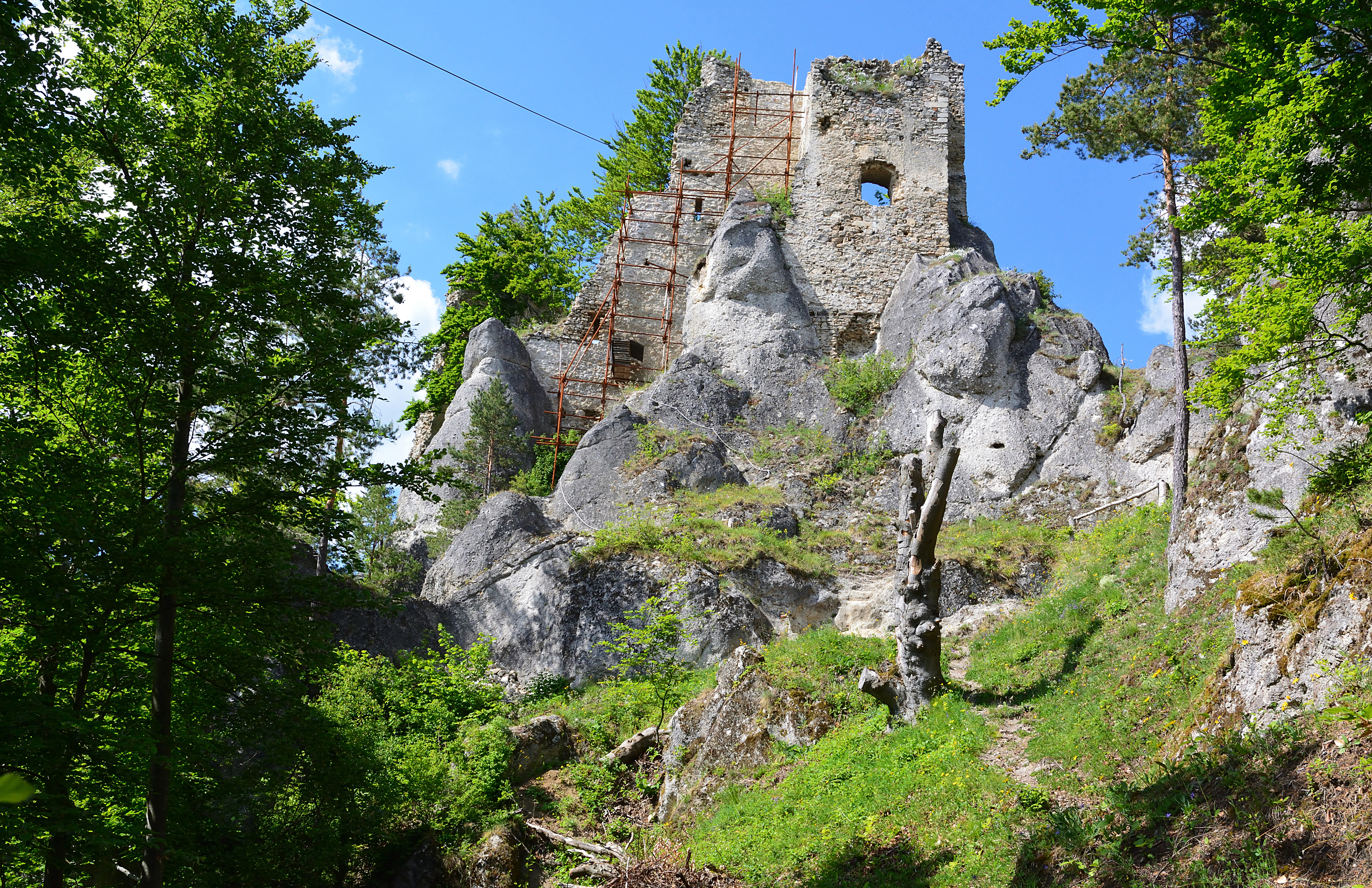
The ruins of Hričov (Hricsó) Castle, possessed by the Bejc clan from 1265 to 1278

Their origin is unknown. They possessed the namesake village lay near Rum in Vas County (present-day Bejcgyertyános, with the merger of the two settlements Bejc and Hegyhátgyertyános after 1927). The only illustrious member of the kindred was Farkas, who entered ecclesiastical service. As a confidant of Béla IV of Hungary during the last decade of his reign, Farkas served as provost of Székesfehérvár and vice-chancellor of the royal court from 1262 to 1268, then Bishop of Győr from 1268 to 1269 or 1270, his death. He was also an unsuccessful candidate for Bishop of Zagreb in 1262. A large forest between Káld and Bejcgyertyános is still called "Farkas-erdő" (lit. Farkas' Forest) today, presumably named after the bishop.

Through his brother Paul, Farkas had a nephew Nicholas, who was granted the castle of Hricsó (present-day Hričovské Podhradie, Slovakia) by Béla IV in 1265, courtesy to his uncle. Stephen V of Hungary confirmed the donation in 1271. Dominic Balassa, the former ispán of Sáros County contested Nicholas' right of ownership over the castle, but Judge royal Alexander Karászi ruled in favor of Nicholas in 1272. Despite that, he sold Hricsó to Biter Balassa (Dominic's cousin) together with his weapons, servants and chattels for 70 marks in 1278.

The Bejc clan existed until the mid-14th century. In 1361, Michael, son of Mark, who himself was a son of "P", sold his estates – Nagypróna, Kispróna (Pravenec, Slovakia), Béla (Belá, Slovakia) – in Trencsén, Nyitra and Turóc counties to another family member John, son of Paul.

== Sources ==
- Győri, Éva (2008). "Győri püspökök a XIII. században [The Bishops of Győr in the 13th Century]". Belvedere Meridionale (in Hungarian). 20 (1–2): 24–43. ISSN 1419-0222.
- Karácsonyi, János (1900). A magyar nemzetségek a XIV. század közepéig. [The Hungarian genera until the middle of the 14th century] (in Hungarian). Hungarian Academy of Sciences.
- Zsoldos, Attila (2011). Magyarország világi archontológiája, 1000–1301 [Secular Archontology of Hungary, 1000–1301] (in Hungarian). História, MTA Történettudományi Intézete. ISBN 978-963-9627-38-3.
