= Bejc =

Bejc could refer to:

- Bejc (genus)
- Farkas Bejc
- Bejcgyertyános
