= Farkas Bejc =

Hungarian bishop

- Bishop of Győr
- Appointed: 1268
- Term ended: 1269
- Predecessor: Amadeus Pok
- Successor: Denis
- Other posts: Bishop-elect of Zagreb; Vice-chancellor

Personal details
- Died: after 1269

Farkas from the kindred Bejc (Hungarian: Bejc nembeli Farkas; died after 1269) was a Hungarian prelate in the 13th century, who served as Bishop of Győr from 1268 to 1269. Prior to that, he was provost of Székesfehérvár and vice-chancellor in the royal court, then briefly elected Bishop of Zagreb.

== Biography ==
Also referred to as Wolfgang, his German name variant, Farkas originated from the gens (clan) Bejc (or Beuch), a minor Hungarian kindred, which possessed lands in Vas County around their centre, Bejc (present-day part of Bejcgyertyános), near the village of Rum. A large forest between Káld and Bejcgyertyános is still called "Farkas-erdő" (lit. Farkas' Forest) today, presumably named after the bishop. Through his brother Paul, he had a nephew Nicholas, who was granted the castle of Hricsó (present-day Hričovské Podhradie, Slovakia) by Béla IV of Hungary in 1265, courtesy to his uncle. The clan existed until the mid-14th century.

Farkas bore the title of "magister", demonstrating his potential education and skills in science. He was a staunch supporter of King Béla IV during his civil war against his son, Duke Stephen. He served as vice-chancellor and provost of the Székesfehérvár Chapter from 1262 to 1268. As a candidate of the monarch, he was elected Bishop of Zagreb by some members of the cathedral chapter in the second half of 1262, but the election was not confirmed by Pope Urban IV, because Béla's rival, the influential cardinal Stephen Báncsa suggested his namesake nephew at first, then the chamberlain of his household, Timothy to become the Bishop of Zagreb. Although Pope Urban IV instructed Farkas to visit the Roman Curia within four months in early 1264, however he was unable to take a journey possibly because of the emerging civil war between Béla IV and his son Duke Stephen. As a compensation of his unsuccessful candidacy in Zagreb previously, Pope Clement IV confirmed him as provost of Székesfehérvár on 4 July 1266.

Farkas was unanimously elected Bishop of Győr around April 1268, as a result he was replaced as vice-chancellor and provost in that year. His election was confirmed by Pope Clement IV. After a short episcopacy, Farkas died in either 1269 or 1270.

== Sources ==
- Bánk, József, ed. (1968). Győregyházmegyei almanach. Schematizmus Dioecesis Jaurinensis [Almanac of the Diocese of Győr] (in Hungarian). Authority of the Diocese of Győr.
- Győri, Éva (2008). "Győri püspökök a XIII. században [The Bishops of Győr in the 13th Century]". Belvedere Meridionale (in Hungarian). 20 (1–2): 24–43. ISSN 1419-0222.
- Jerković, Marko (2015). "Imenovanje papinoga kapelana Timoteja zagrebačkim biskupom 1263. godine: studija o odnosima srednjovjekovnih središta moći [The appointment of papal chaplain Timothy to Zagreb episcopal dignity in 1263: A study of relations between medieval centres of power]". Croatica Christiana Periodica (in Croatian). 39 (76). Catholic Faculty of Theology, University of Zagreb: 27–48. ISSN 0350-7823.
- Zsoldos, Attila (2011). Magyarország világi archontológiája, 1000–1301 [Secular Archontology of Hungary, 1000–1301] (in Hungarian). História, MTA Történettudományi Intézete. ISBN 978-963-9627-38-3.

Farkas Genus Bejc Born: ? Died: after 1269
Political offices
Preceded by Paul Balog	Vice-chancellor; 1262–1268	Succeeded by Demetrius
Catholic Church titles
Preceded by Paul Balog (elected)	Provost of Székesfehérvár; 1262–1268	Succeeded by Demetrius
Preceded by Philip Türje	Bishop of Zagreb (elected); 1262–1263	Succeeded by Timothy
Preceded by Amadeus Pok	Bishop of Győr; 1268–1269	Succeeded by Denis
