= John III (bishop of Nyitra) =

Hungarian prelate

John
- Bishop of Nyitra
- Installed: 1302 or earlier
- Term ended: 1328
- Predecessor: Paschasius
- Successor: Mieszko of Bytom

Personal details
- Died: 9/18 March 1328
- Denomination: Roman Catholic

John (Hungarian: János; died between 9 and 18 March 1328) was a Hungarian prelate in the first half of the 14th century, who served as Bishop of Nyitra (present-day Nitra, Slovakia) at least from 1302 until his death. He belonged to the earliest partisans of Charles I of Hungary and his dynasty. During his reign, which roughly coincided with the era of feudal anarchy, the diocese of Nyitra was constantly harassed and plundered by the troops of the powerful and greedy oligarch Matthew Csák.

== Early life ==
John was born in the second half of the 1260s into a large and wealthy noble family. His unidentified parents, brothers and sisters were still alive in 1301, according to King Charles' royal charter issued in the next year. John was archdeacon of Nógrád from 1296 to 1298, within the Archdiocese of Esztergom. In this capacity, he served as chancellor of Archbishop-elect Gregory Bicskei. It is plausible that he is identical with that magister John, who served as provost of the St. Emmeram's Cathedral in Nyitra in the period between 1298 and 1299. John is the only known office-holder in the medieval kingdom of Hungary, who presided the cathedral chapter of Nyitra with the title of provost (otherwise, the church was headed by the lector, then the vicar). According to historians Mihály Kurecskó and György Rácz, John, with the title of provost, de facto governed the Diocese of Nyitra on a temporary basis, prior to his official confirmation as bishop.

When a group of powerful lords turned against Andrew III of Hungary and urged Charles II of Naples to send his grandson, the 12-year-old Charles, to Hungary in order to become king in the autumn of 1299, John also joined their movement. The young Charles disembarked in Split in August 1300, but majority of the powerful lords, however, shortly reconciled with Andrew, preventing Charles' success. Nonetheless, John remained a partisan of the Capetian House of Anjou and remained a strong confidant of Archbishop Gregory Bicskei who resolutely supported the claim of the Anjous and faced the entire high priesthood in this course. Andrew III died on 14 January 1301, With his death, the House of Árpád became extinct. A civil war ensued in the following years for the Hungarian throne. After learning the news, Charles hurried to Hungary with his small army. He was crowned with a provisional crown by Bicskei in Esztergom in May 1301. John also attended the ceremony, which most Hungarians considered unlawful because of disregard of customary laws. The aforementioned charter preserves that John and his family were exposed to threats, attacks and impoverishment, and even humiliation, torture, or murder because of their loyalty to Charles. The neighboring lords were all considered nominal partisans of Charles' rival, Wenceslaus, including John's archenemy, Matthew Csák, who had established a large-scale domain in the area at the turn of the 13th and 14th centuries; he ruled de facto independently the north-western counties of Medieval Hungary.

== Bishop of Nyitra ==
=== First years ===
John was first mentioned as bishop on 24 January 1302 by a document of papal legate Niccolò Boccasini, but it is plausible he already served in this capacity from the previous year, as the legate referred to him simply "episcopus", without the phrases postulatus or electus. John's recent predecessor, Paschasius last appeared in contemporary records in August 1297. Historian Tamás Kádár considers the election of John was confirmed by Boccasini on behalf of Pope Boniface VIII sometime after October 1301. The document narrates that John stayed in the vicinity of the papal legate's residence at Pressburg (present-day Bratislava, Slovakia). Hungarian prelates John of Nyitra, Paul Balog of Pécs and Anthony of Csanád advised the papal legate on legal issues concerning customary law, when declared the choice of the provost of Szepes chapter (today Spišská Kapitula in Spišské Podhradie) is the right of the members of the collegiate chapter and not of the Hungarian king. John participated at the synod of the Hungarian prelates convoked by Boccasini in the spring of 1302.

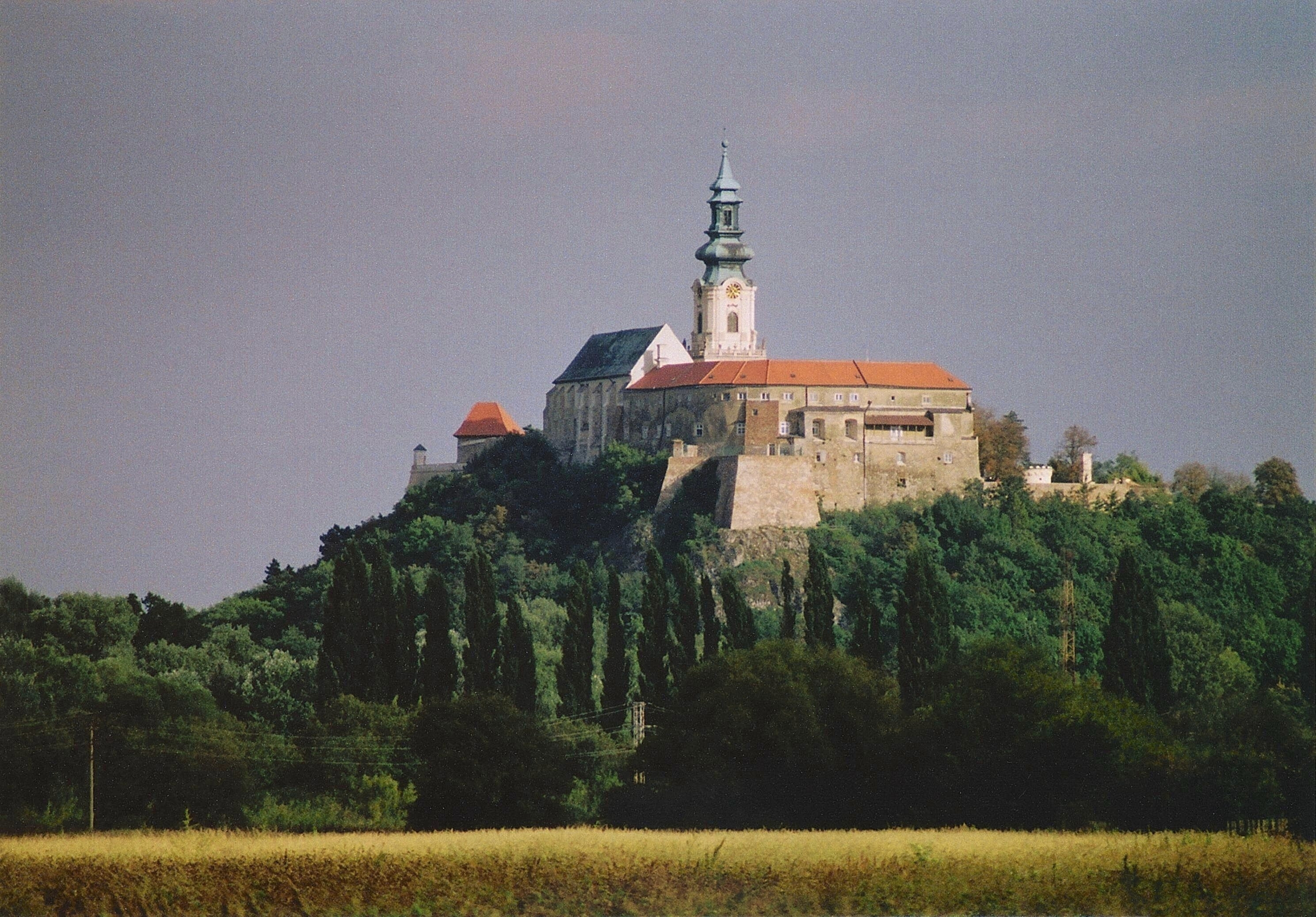
Nitra Castle and its St. Emmeram's Cathedral, Nitra (today in Slovakia)

For his loyal service and sacrifice, the grateful monarch, Charles donated Nyitra County to him and his successors on hereditary right in mid-1302, and consequently, in principle, John became the first hereditary or perpetual count of Nyitra. John and his small-size auxiliary troops from Nyitra County took part in the fruitless siege of Buda in September 1302 by Charles. Wenceslaus' partisans successfully relieved the city. John was present, when Charles met his cousin, Rudolph III of Austria, in Pressburg on 24 August 1304. The monarchs concluded an alliance against the Kingdom of Bohemia, and John was among the barons and prelates of the realm, who countersigned and swore to the document. John participated in the provincial synod at Udvard, Komárom County (present-day Dvory nad Žitavou, Slovakia) convoked by Archbishop Thomas in May 1307. There, the prelates renewed the excommunication of the burghers of Buda, who had supported the local heresy and placed the town under interdict. In addition, Archbishop Thomas and his suffragans called all the subjects of the realm to obey the king's commandments, otherwise they were ready to place the whole kingdom under interdict. John assisted Archbishop Thomas in order to confirm Peter of Pécs as Bishop of Pécs in September 1308. John, alongside other prelates and nobles, attended the meeting at the Pauline Monastery of Kékes on 10 November 1308, when the arriving papal legate Gentile Portino da Montefiore managed to persuade Matthew Csák to accept King Charles' rule. John also participated in the subsequent Diet, where Charles was unanimously proclaimed king on 27 November 1308. Thereafter, the papal legate convoked the synod of the Hungarian prelates, including John, who declared the monarch inviolable in December 1308. John attended the second and third coronations of Charles in June 1309 and August 1310, respectively.

His godson, Abraham the Red donated his two lands, both named Keresnyen in Bars County (today Veľké Kršteňany and Malé Kršteňany in Slovakia) to the Diocese of Nyitra in May 1310. John requested the cathedral chapter of Esztergom (place of authentication) in January 1312 to transcribe the donation letter of Béla IV of Hungary from 1267, who attached the tithe of Bánya (today Banka, Slovakia) to his diocese. Upon his request, the chapter also transcribed the privilege letters of Pope Lucius III and Archbishop Lodomer (1285) in June 1313, which assigned the tithe of villages Preznec, Bossány and Kerencs (today Práznovce, Bošany and Krnča in Slovakia, respectively) and a quarter of income of the churches of Tapolcsány and Koros (present-day Topoľčianky and Krušovce in Slovakia, respectively) to the bishopric of Nyitra. John's ally and superior, Archbishop Thomas also confirmed the former donations simultaneously. In addition, the archbishop and Charles himself confirmed the aforementioned 1302 donation of Nyitra County to the diocese in August 1313.

=== Struggles with Matthew Csák ===
However, he could not enjoy his rights and incoming as a bishop or as a count at all, because the greater part of the lands of his diocese was occupied and unlawfully seized by the oligarch Matthew Csák, who expanded aggressively in Upper Hungary in the first decade of the 14th century. Matthew Csák turned against Charles and even laid siege Buda in June 1311. The monarch sent an army to invade Matthew Csák's domains in September, but it achieved nothing. Since then, constant warfare struck Upper Hungary and the surrounding counties. In the following years, the oligarch's faithful partisan, Simon Kacsics launched massive attacks against the Diocese of Nyitra in order to expand their influence. Around October 1313, he besieged and captured the diocese's seat, Nyitra Castle on behalf of Csák, causing serious damage in the walls. He handed over the fort to his lord and became its castellan thereafter. Subsequently, Simon plundered and looted the surrounding episcopal estates and villages. Years later, John recalled that after the seizure of Nyitra Castle and destroying several episcopal villages, Simon loudly abused and intended to stab the bishop with a sword in the presence of Matthew Csák, but the powerful oligarch prevented him by his admonition. Thereafter, Simon blasphemed John with disparaging and blasphemous words. The cathedral and the associated buildings (chapter seat, library, towers etc.) were completely looted and burnt by the Csák troops. The relics of St. Zorard and St. Benedict were also destroyed, in addition to crosses, chasubles, calyces and bells. According to estimations, the cathedral suffered altogether 2,000 marks of damage as a result of continuous plundering raids.

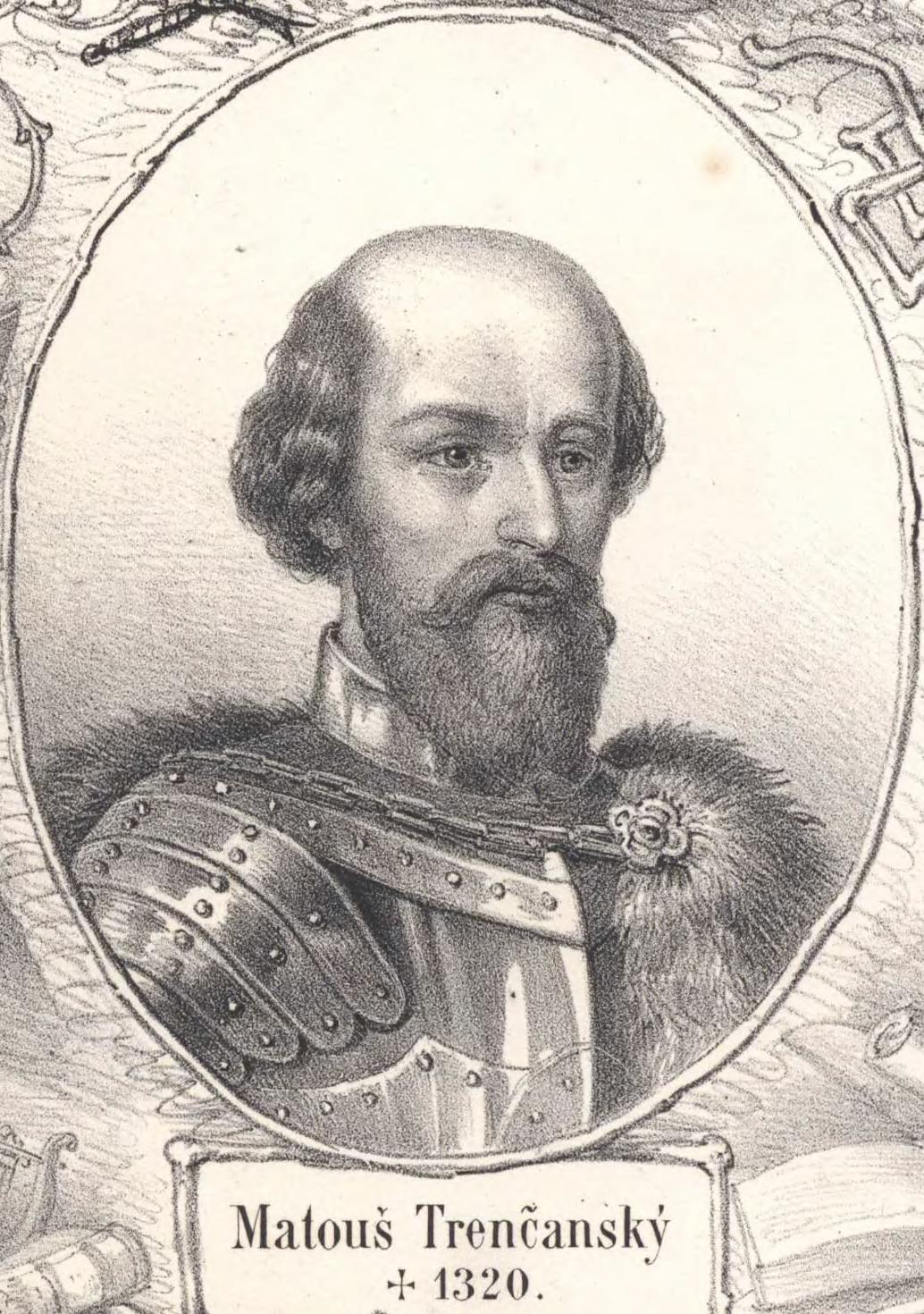
Bishop John's archenemy, Matthew Csák, who ruled Northwest Hungary as an independent oligarch

John's charter from March 1318 (see below) details the oligarch and his henchmen's criminal record against the Diocese of Nyitra over the years. According to the document, the Csák troops plundered and burnt the episcopal villages of Cseke, Körtvélyes and Bille (present-day Čakajovce, Hrušovany and Belince in Slovakia, respectively). Matthew Csák unlawfully acquired and usurped the diocese's mansion house at Trencsén (today Trenčín, Slovakia) since the death of Bishop Paschasius. His troops seized several episcopal villages and landholdings throughout in Nyitra County. According to the document, Matthew Csák prevented the church officials to collect the tithe in the territory of the diocese and assigned it to himself and his own treasury. With this, the oligarch caused a minimum 4,500 marks of deficit to the bishopric for the past fifteen years. Csák also confiscated and usurped that customs and port duties, which belonged to the Diocese of Nyitra (annually income of 200 marks), since John took his dignity. Sometime, John bought valuable baize for his diocese at the fair of Nagyszombat (present-day Trnava, Slovakia), but Csák's men confiscated and transferred it to their lord's own manor house. John's indictment specifically named Matthew's accomplices and servants along with their involvement in the crimes against the episcopate. For instance, a certain Nicholas "the German" stole 70 oxen from Nyitra, while Ladislaus of Hrussó robbed and killed the episcopal serfs in Szkacsány (today Skačany, Slovakia). Another familiaris, Paul Cseke entrenched a tower at Nyitra Castle and made plundering raids against the nearby villages from there. A certain Stephen, son of Móka stormed and looted John's house in Szkacsány, wounding some of his servants and confiscating the bishop's personal property. Through the years, the oligarch's officials transferred the episcopal folks from the surrounding villages into the province of Csák and forced them to labour service in fortress reinforcements and constructions. These people were also deported permanently from their villages and were forcibly resettled in newly-established settlements in Matthew Csák's dominion. Bishop John was prevented from visiting the remaining episcopal villages and Matthew Csák assumed the right of episcopal authority over the Diocese of Nyitra. He even judged over ecclesiastical affairs and his verdicts were completely biased in favor of his familiares, according to John's arraignment. The powerful oligarch considered the bishop as his "personal chaplain" and employed him as a courier in his province. The document also narrates that his troops captured and tortured some of the wealthier serfs after the capture of Nyitra Castle and Csák also imposed extraordinary tax in the possessions of the cathedral chapter in order to ransom the hostages, who were sent to the court of his enemy, Dominic Rátót during their short-lived reconciliation. Matthew Csák demanded John to swear oath of loyalty and send hostages to his provincial seat. In order to eliminate the ecclesiastical censures against his territory (papal legate Gentile excommunicated Matthew Csák and placed the province under interdict on 6 July 1311), the oligarch convened "heretics, murderers, outlaw clergymen and seculars" (including Csák's ally, Stephen, abbot of Szkála), who held worship services and performed church activities (masses, ceremonies, burials, collection of church taxes etc.) in the province. Simultaneously, John's clerics were expelled from their parishes and the seal of the cathedral chapter was also usurped and unlawfully used to falsify non-authentic documents and charters. Under these circumstances, Bishop John and his cathedral chapter did not engage in open opposition and was forced to obey the oligarch; in 1312, the chapter even referred to Matthew Csák as "mighty prince" (Latin: magnificus princeps) shortly before the Battle of Rozgony.

In the following years, John spent his exile at the archiepiscopal court of Esztergom; his name disappears from contemporary records between 1313 and 1316. He resided in Kakat (later Párkány, present-day Štúrovo, Slovakia) on 4 September 1317, alongside Archbishop Thomas and other prelates, when excommunicated Simon Kacsics for his crimes against the church. John also took part in the subsequent royal campaign against Matthew Csák. He was present at the successful siege of Komárom (now Komárno in Slovakia), which fell to Charles on 3 November 1317. However, the Hungarian monarch concluded a short-lived peace with the oligarch. Accordingly, Matthew Csák was able to retain the Diocese of Nyitra and its usurped possessions and benefits, in addition to other captured lands which had belonged to the Archdiocese of Esztergom. Both Archbishop Thomas and Bishop John strongly protested against the agreement. In response, the prelates of the realm summoned a national synod to Kalocsa and made an alliance in the spring of 1318 against all who would jeopardize their interests. During the meeting, John excommunicated Matthew Csák and his most loyal familiares and placed the Csák province under interdict on 3 March 1318. According to historian György Rácz, John's act was a demonstrative tool for expressing dislike towards Charles' politically motivated agreement with Csák, who was then considered nominally "loyal" in the royal court. John attended the Diet at Székesfehérvár in November 1320.

=== Last years ===
Matthew Csák died on 18 March 1321. The royal army invaded the deceased lord's province, which soon disintegrated because most of his former castellans yielded without resistance. Charles personally led the siege of Csák's former seat, Trencsén which fell on 8 August. The bishopric successfully recovered the castle and its cathedral after 8 years. Returning to his diocese, John immediately began to assess the damage and the organization of renovation work of the cathedral and its accessories. Because of peaceful period and slow growth, the bishop gradually appears less frequently in contemporary records, which also reflects that he retired from public affairs and the royal court. To his disappointment, Charles I did not renew his former donation of Nyitra County to the diocese after his victory and made his faithful partisan, Lampert Hermán as ispán of the county in 1322. Despite that John was frequently styled himself as "comes perpetuus Nitriensis" in his charters and documents.

for John's intercession, a certain Smaragd, son of Adam from Trencsén County donated his landholdings – Püspöki and Nyeste in Trencsén County, Horó in Bars County and Kispográny in Nyitra County (present-day Trenčianske Biskupice [part of Trenčín], Horné Naštice, Kalná nad Hronom and Pohranice in Slovakia, respectively) – to the diocese in June 1322. Pope John XXII instructed John, along with Nicholas Dörögdi, the archdeacon of Nyitra to force Conrad, the Bishop of Olomouc to return the confiscated property of Andrew Szécsi, Bishop of Transylvania in February 1323. Upon the bishop's request, Charles I transcribed the former donations of Ladislaus IV to the Diocese of Nyitra in July 1323 (possibly as a compensation for the removal of perpetual ispánate). The monarch also recovered Csápor and Zsitvatő (today parts of Cabaj-Čápor and Radvaň nad Dunajom in Slovakia, respectively) to John in his two verdicts in 1326 and 1327. John was last mentioned as a living person on 9 March 1328. He died in the following few days, the episcopal see of Nyitra was vacant by 18 March. The office-holding of John was by far the longest governmental period in the history of the bishopric of Nyitra in Medieval Hungary.

== Sources ==
- Engel, Pál (1988). "Az ország újraegyesítése. I. Károly küzdelmei az oligarchák ellen (1310–1323) [Reunification of the Realm. The Struggles of Charles I Against the Oligarchs (1310–1323)]". Századok (in Hungarian). 122 (1–2). Magyar Történelmi Társulat: 89–146. ISSN 0039-8098.
- Engel, Pál (1996). Magyarország világi archontológiája, 1301–1457, I. [Secular Archontology of Hungary, 1301–1457, Volume I] (in Hungarian). História, MTA Történettudományi Intézete. ISBN 963-8312-44-0.
- Kádár, Tamás (2017). "(III.) János nyitrai püspök (1302–1328) életútja [The Profession of John (III) Bishop of Nyitra (1302–1328)]". Magyar Egyháztörténeti Vázlatok (in Hungarian). 29 (1–2): 5–21. ISSN 0865-5227.
- Kristó, Gyula (2003). "I. Károly király harcai a tartományurak ellen (1310–1323) [The Struggles of Charles I Against the Oligarchs (1310–1323)]". Századok (in Hungarian). 137 (2). Magyar Történelmi Társulat: 297–347. ISSN 0039-8098.
- Maléth, Ágnes (2020). A Magyar Királyság és a Szentszék kapcsolata I. Károly korában (1301–1342) [The Relationship of the Hungarian Kingdom and the Holy See in the time of Charles I (1301–1342)] (in Hungarian). Pécsi Tudományegyetem BTK TTI Középkori és Koraújkori Történeti Tanszék. ISBN 978-963-429-500-6.
- Rácz, György (2020). "Az egyházi elit változásai [Changes in the Church Elite]". In Csukovits, Enikő (ed.). Az Anjou-kor hatalmi elitje (in Hungarian). MTA Bölcsészettudományi Kutatóközpont. pp. 133–162. ISBN 978-963-416-212-4.

Catholic Church titles
Preceded by Paschasius	Bishop of Nyitra; 1302–1328	Succeeded by Mieszko of Bytom
