= Paschasius (bishop of Nyitra) =

13th-century Hungarian Catholic bishop

- Bishop of Nyitra
- Installed: 1285
- Term ended: 1297 or later
- Predecessor: Peter
- Successor: John
- Other post: Provost of Pressburg

Personal details
- Died: 1297/1302
- Denomination: Catholic Church

Paschasius (Hungarian: Paska, Slovak: Pascház; died between 1297 and 1302) was a Hungarian Catholic prelate in the 13th century, who served as Bishop of Nyitra from 1285 to at least 1297.

== Early career ==
Based on a brief comment by a charter issued in 1296, it is possible that Paschasius (also Pascasius or Pasca) was born into the gens (clan) Ludány of Bohemian origin, as the son of military leader Bogomer Ludány (or Bohumír). In this case, he had two brothers, Peter I and Szoboszló II (or Soběslav). Other document says (see below), Paschasius had at least five brothers. Paschasius had a nephew called Peter, a canon of the cathedral chapter of Esztergom, who later jointed the Paulines at the Holy Cross Abbey (near present-day Kesztölc in Hungary).

Paschasius was a member of the royal chapel during the reign of Stephen V of Hungary (r. 1270–1272). During that time, he acted as confessor of the royal family ("familiaris clericus"). He was elected Provost of Pressburg (or Pozsony; present-day Bratislava, Slovakia) sometime between 1278 and 1280. In this capacity, he mediated and assisted the reconciliation between King Ladislaus IV of Hungary and papal legate Philip III, Bishop of Fermo – both were imprisoned prior to that – in the spring of 1280. For his efforts, Paschasius and his collegiate chapter were granted Szelincs (present-day Zeleneč, Slovakia) in August 1280. Before that the village belonged to the accessories of Pressburg Castle. A certain Nicholas succeeded him as provost at least from July 1284. Paschasius faithfully served Ladislaus IV, whose reign was characterized by constant anarchy and series of rebellions.

== Bishop of Nyitra ==
Sometime after January 1285, Paschasius was elected Bishop of Nyitra (today Nitra, Slovakia), succeeding Peter. He is first mentioned in this capacity in August 1285. In that year, Ladislaus IV sent him as royal envoy on a "secret mission" to the Duchy of Austria in order to negotiate with Duke Albert, son of Rudolf I of Germany. Returning Hungary, Cuman marauders attacked Paschasius and his entourage. The bishop was captured, robbed, stripped naked and tied up for several days, while his five brothers, in addition to other relatives and companions, altogether eighteen persons were brutally murdered. After some days, Paschasius was free to leave without his clothes. Some historians – e.g. Samu Borovszky and Attila Bárány – connected this event to the second Mongol invasion of Hungary at the turn of 1285 and 1286. As a compensation for his suffers and faithful service, Ladislaus IV donated all lands, estates and privileges of the hospes (foreign "guest settlers") of Nyitra Castle, both inside and outside, to Paschasius and his diocese, while he was granted the right to settle "guests" and collect their revenues and taxes on his own portfolio in May 1288. Simultaneously, these lands were removed form the suzerainty of the ispán of Nyitra County. Consequently, Nyitra became an episcopal town.

Paschasius was involved in a lawsuit with his cathedral chapter over the tithes of estates in Nyitra County in 1285. Before the court of the metropolitan Lodomer, the Archbishop of Esztergom, the chapter proved that the tithes of these villages belonged to that body, because the canons acquired the right of collection as a donation from the archbishop. Paschasius swore loyalty to the new monarch Andrew III of Hungary in 1290. Upon the request of Archbishop Lodomer and the two local bishops, Andrew of Eger and Paschasius of Nyitra, the newly crowned monarch confirmed the powerful lord Amadeus Aba in his all revenues in Ung County along with his positions in November 1290. Throughout the reign of Andrew III, Paschasius was a member of the advisory board or royal council along with other prelates of the realm. He took part in the royal campaign against Austria in the summer of 1291.

Paschasius, alongside other prelates, participated in the consecration of the Franciscan church in Pressburg, dedicated to Virgin Mary, in March 1297. Sometime in the 1280s, Paschasius was granted the estate Kereskény (today Krškany, Slovakia) from Queen Isabella of Sicily. Despite that Ladislaus handed over the land to local lord Ernye of Cseg. Upon the request of the bishop, Andrew III confirmed the diocese's right of ownership over the estate in 1297. Paschasius granted the privilege to collect tithes in its own territory to the Benedictine abbey of Szkalka (today Skalka, Slovakia) in 1297. He is last mentioned as a living person in August 1297. His successor John is first referred to as Bishop of Nyitra only in 1302. Following Paschasius' death, the local powerful oligarch Matthew Csák unlawfully seized and usurped the diocese's mansion house at Trencsén (today Trenčín, Slovakia).

== Sources ==
- C. Tóth, Norbert (2020). A pozsonyi társaskáptalan archontológiája, 1204–1462 [Archontology of the Collegiate Chapter of Pressburg, 1204–1462] (in Hungarian). Subsidia ad historiam medii aevi Hungariae inquirendam 12., National Archives of Hungary. ISBN 978-615-00-9926-1.
- Kristó, Gyula, ed. (2000). Középkori históriák oklevelekben (1002–1410) [Medieval Stories in Charters (1002–1410)] (in Hungarian). Szegedi Középkorász Műhely. ISBN 963-482-423-4.
- Szentpétery, Imre (1961). Az Árpád-házi királyok okleveleinek kritikai jegyzéke II. kötet 2–3. füzet, 1272–1290 [A Critical Register of Royal Charters from the House of Árpád, Vol. 2. No. 2–3.] (in Hungarian). Magyar Országos Levéltár.
- Szentpétery, Imre; Borsa, Iván (1987). Az Árpád-házi királyok okleveleinek kritikai jegyzéke II. kötet 4. füzet, 1290–1301 [A Critical Register of Royal Charters from the House of Árpád, Vol. 2. No. 4.] (in Hungarian). Magyar Országos Levéltár. ISBN 963-05-4199-8.
- Zsoldos, Attila (2011). Magyarország világi archontológiája, 1000–1301 [Secular Archontology of Hungary, 1000–1301] (in Hungarian). História, MTA Történettudományi Intézete. ISBN 978-963-9627-38-3.

Catholic Church titles
Preceded by Anthony	Provost of Pressburg; 1280	Succeeded by Nicholas
Preceded by Peter	Bishop of Nyitra; 1285–1297	Succeeded by John
