= Bogomer Ludány =

Historical Hungarian figure

Count of the Székelys
- Reign: 1228
- Predecessor: First known
- Successor: Mojs Ákos (eventually)
- Died: between 1245 and 1254
- Noble family: gens Ludány
- Issue: Peter I Szoboszló II; Paschasius (?)
- Father: Szoboszló I

Bogomer from the kindred Ludány (Hungarian: Ludány nembeli Bogomér; died around 1245/54) was a Hungarian military leader and nobleman in the first half of the 13th century, who was the first known Count of the Székelys, serving in this capacity around 1228.

== Ancestry and family ==
Majority of the historians, including Mór Wertner, Zoltán Kordé and Attila Zsoldos considered, Bogomer (or Bohumír) was born into the gens (clan) Ludány, which owned landed properties primarily in Nyitra County. According to the Gesta Hunnorum et Hungarorum written by chronicler Simon of Kéza, the Ludány kindred originated from Bohemia, which claim is strengthened by the frequency of Slavic-origin personal names within the kinship. Bogomer was one of the two known sons of Szoboszló I (or Sobéslav), who served as ispán of Sempte ispánate (today Šintava, Slovakia) in the territory of Nyitra County in 1221. His brother was Wytk I, ancestor of the Ludányi family. Bogomer had at least two sons from his unidentified marriage: Peter I (fl. 1277–97) and Szoboszló II (fl. 1283–95). Based on a brief comment by a charter issued in 1296, regarding Peter (who became a familiaris of the powerful local lord Matthew Csák by then), it is presumable that Paschasius, Bishop of Nyitra was also Bogomer's son. Through Szoboszló II, Bogomer was the forefather of the Emőkei and Szobonya noble families.

== Béla's partisan ==
Bogomer belonged to Duke Béla's confidants, who strongly opposed his father King Andrew II "useless and superfluous perpetual grants" which caused the derogation of the royal power in the realm. Béla was made Duke of Slavonia in 1220, and Bogomer was member of his ducal court, along with other young courtiers, for instance Denis Türje, Paul Geregye and Pousa, son of Sólyom. Bogomer was mentioned as Master of the cupbearers for Duke Béla by several charters throughout 1225.

In the next year, Béla was transferred to Transylvania, he governed the province with the title Duke too. Bogomer followed his lord to Transylvania. The earliest royal charter mentioning a "count and commander of the Székelys" (Latin: comes et ductor Siculorum) was issued in 1235, which refers to a military campaign launched against Bulgaria in 1228. Accordingly, Bogomer, then Count of the Székelys, participated in the war, when he was captured by the army of Ivan Asen II's brother Alexander. Bogomer is the first known holder of the dignity, albeit Bishop Otto of Freising already mentioned that "two counts" commanded the archers in the vanguard of the Hungarian army in the Battle of the Fischa in 1146, while the Hungarian chronicles recorded that Székelys and Pechenegs formed the vanguard of the Hungarian army in that battle, thus the bishop's report may contain the first reference to a count of the Székelys, according to Attila Zsoldos, Gyula Kristó, and other historians. On the other hand, as historian Zoltán Kordé emphasizes, 13th-century royal charters mentioned other royal officials who ruled Székely groups, suggesting that the office had not been established in the previous century. For instance, a royal charter narrated of an army of Saxon, Vlach, Székely, and Pecheneg troops fighting in Bulgaria under the command of Joachim, Count of Hermannstadt, in the early 1210s, which suggests Bogomer could be the first-ever office-holder, who possibly became count already in 1226. Kordé argued Andrew II granted autonomy to colonial Saxons of Hermannstadt region in Southern Transylvania, when issued Diploma Andreanum (1224), just before the following year, when he launched a campaign against the Teutonic Knights, who had attempted to eliminate his suzerainty. According to Kordé, the standardization of the Székelys' status took place in the same time.

Bogomer next appeared in sources one and a half decades later, even after Béla's accession to the Hungarian throne in 1235 and the Mongol invasion of Hungary in 1241. After the Mongols' unexpected withdrawal in March 1242, Bogomer was appointed ispán of Nyitra and Trencsén Counties. In that capacity, Bogomer was responsible for restore law and order in the region, while managed to resettle the dispersed and fleeing population. Soon he was replaced as head of Nyitra County by Roland Rátót around November 1242, but he was able to retain his dignity in Trencsén County at least until April 1243. During his tenure, Frederick II, Duke of Austria invaded the country. Bogomer played an important role in the suppression of Austrian units, shortly thereafter he led a royal army send to help Bolesław V the Chaste (son-in-law of Béla IV, the Hungarian king) attacked by Konrad I of Masovia. For his loyalty and military successes, Bogomer was granted the lands of Kiszuca (Jeszeszin), Pruska and Mortund (in Trencsén and Hont Counties) by Béla in May 1244. He was transferred to the position of ispán of Zala County by December 1245. Bogomer died by 24 October 1254, when Jeszeszin, his previously owned land was donated to members of the Zólyom kinship.

== Sources ==
- Kordé, Zoltán (2001). "A székely ispáni méltóság kezdeteiről [About the origin of the office of the count of the Székelys]". In Barbu, Violeta; Tüdős S., Kinga (eds.). Historia manet. Volum omagial. Demény Lajos emlékkönyv (in Hungarian). Editura Kriterion. pp. 199–207. OCLC 909140187.
- Kordé, Zoltán (2016). "Közigazgatás [Administration]; Katonáskodó székelyek az írott forrásokban [Székely soldiers in the written sources]". In Benkő, Elek; Oborni, Teréz (eds.). Székelyföld története, I. kötet: A kezdetektől 1562-ig (in Hungarian). Magyar Tudományos Akadémia Bölcsészettudományi Kutatóközpont, Erdélyi Múzeum-Egyesület, Haáz Rezső Múzeum. pp. 168–180, 305–320. ISBN 978-606-739-040-7.
- Zsoldos, Attila (2011). Magyarország világi archontológiája, 1000–1301 [Secular Archontology of Hungary, 1000–1301] (in Hungarian). História, MTA Történettudományi Intézete. ISBN 978-963-9627-38-3.
- Zsoldos, Attila (2016). "Béla erdélyi herceg bárói [The Barons of Béla, Duke of Transylvania]". In Dáné, Veronika; Lupescu-Makó, Mária; Sipos, Gábor (eds.). Testimonio litterarum. Tanulmányok Jakó Zsigmond tiszteletére (in Hungarian). Erdélyi Múzeum Egyesület. pp. 441–449. ISBN 978-606-739-054-4.

Bogomer Genus Ludány Born: ? Died: between 1245 and 1254
Political offices
Preceded by first known	Count of the Székelys c. 1228	Succeeded by Mojs Ákos (?)
