= Anthony (bishop of Zagreb) =

Hungarian jurist and prelate

- Bishop of Zagreb
- Appointed: May 1287
- Term ended: 5 November 1287
- Predecessor: Timothy
- Successor: John
- Other posts: Provost of Pressburg; Archdeacon of Sasvár; Provost of Székesfehérvár

Personal details
- Died: 5 November 1287
- Education: University of Bologna

Anthony (Hungarian: Antal, Croatian: Antun; died 5 November 1287) was a Hungarian jurist and prelate in the 13th century, who briefly served as Bishop of Zagreb in 1287.

== Origin and studies ==
Anthony was born into a noble family, which possessed lands in Vas County. Their lands centered around Paty, therefore he is also referred to as Anthony Patyi. His brothers were comes Beled (Belyd), Hyacinth and Roland. Anthony attended the University of Bologna according to a record from June 1265, when bought a three-volume Digesta Justiniani Infortiatum by Accursius for 40 bolognini. He obtained the title of doctor decretorum ("doctor of canon law") there prior 1272.

== Early career ==
Returning Hungary, Anthony served as provost of Pressburg (present-day Bratislava, Slovakia) from 1271 to 1278. Simultaneously, he was also a canon of the cathedral chapter of Esztergom and archdeacon of Sasvár. Anthony functioned as chancellor in the court of Philip Türje, Archbishop of Esztergom. During the Bohemian–Hungarian War of 1271, he acted as a royal envoy to Ottokar II of Bohemia in order to conclude the Peace of Pressburg. He was also entrusted to perform another foreign services during his career. Therefore, Stephen V of Hungary donated him and his brothers an island of the river Rába near their estates in May 1272. The king also exempted the island from the jurisdiction of the ispán of the castle of Vasvár. He and his brothers were also granted the village Petlend near Paty till the river Keurus (Körös) for their loyal services by King Ladislaus IV of Hungary in May 1276. Provost Ladislaus bequeathed the legal codex Summa Goffridi by Italian jurist Geoffrey of Trani to Anthony in 1277.

During the 1270s Bohemian–Hungarian wars, Pressburg and its area suffered heavy damages, when the Bohemians besieged and occupied the castle. Upon Anthony's request, Ladislaus IV confirmed the provostship's ownership over the surrounding estates and fishponds sometime after September 1277, since the previous donation letters were taken away by the Bohemian troops. The Hungarian monarch also exempted the provostship's lands from the jurisdiction of the ispán of Pozsony County. Returning from the victorious Battle on the Marchfeld in late August 1278, the Hungarian army arrived to Pressburg. Upon Anthony's request as a compensation for the war losses, Ladislaus IV donated the uninhabited lands Flezyndorph (laid in present-day Petržalka) and Szelincs (Zeleneč, Slovakia) in Pozsony County to the provostship, also excepting those estates from the local ispán.

Sometime between March and May 1279, Anthony was elected as provost of Székesfehérvár, replacing Nicholas Kán in this position. Anthony is last styled as provost on 27 March 1287.

== Bishop of Zagreb ==
Following the death of Timothy, Anthony was elected as suffragan of Zagreb in early May 1287 (the cathedral chapter's list of bishops from the 14th century states that Anthony functioned in this capacity for six months before his death). According to Croatian historian Antun Nekić, his previous position reflects that he was a candidate of the Hungarian royal court of Ladislaus IV or the prelates of the realm rather than the local clerics and the cathedral chapter. Lelja Dobronić claims that his election was confirmed by the Holy See without delay.

During his short episcopal administration, Anthony appears only once in the sources. On 6 October 1287, he resolved a long-time dispute between the bishop and the cathedral chapter. Upon the request of the canons, he returned to them the right to donate and appoint prebends, but they were only allowed to give them to persons ordained priests and to those who wished to function permanently in the church. Anthony died suddenly on 5 November 1287, according to the aforementioned 14th-century document. He was succeeded by John in the next year.

== Sources ==
- C. Tóth, Norbert (2019). Az esztergomi székes- és társaskáptalanok archontológiája 1100–1543 [Archontology of the Cathedral and Collegiate Chapters of Esztergom, 1100–1543] (in Hungarian). Magyar Tudományos Akadémia Magyar Medievisztikai Kutatócsoportja. ISBN 978-963-508-913-0.
- C. Tóth, Norbert (2020). A pozsonyi társaskáptalan archontológiája, 1204–1462 [Archontology of the Collegiate Chapter of Pressburg, 1204–1462] (in Hungarian). Subsidia ad historiam medii aevi Hungariae inquirendam 12., National Archives of Hungary. ISSN 1787-9213.
- Dobronić, Lelja (1995). "Antun [Anthony]". In Franko, Mirošević (ed.). Zagrebački biskupi i nadbiskupi [Bishops and Archbishops of Zagreb] (in Croatian). Školska knjiga. pp. 81–82. ISBN 953-0-60597-8.
- Haraszti Szabó, Péter; Kelényi, Borbála (2019). Magyarországi diákok francia, angol, itáliai és német egyetemeken a középkorban, 1100–1526 [Students from Hungary at the Universities of France, England, Italy and Germany in the Middle Ages 1100–1526] (in Hungarian). ELTE Egyetemi Könyvtár és Levéltár; MTA ELTE Egyetemtörténeti Kutatócsoport. ISBN 978-963-489-098-0.
- Kertész, Balázs (2022). A székesfehérvári káptalan archontológiája és oklevéladó tevékenysége az Árpád-korban [The Archontology and Diploma Issuing Activity of the Chapter of Székesfehérvár in the Age of Árpáds] (in Hungarian). Városi Levéltár és Kutatóintézet. ISBN 978-963-8406-27-9.
- Nekić, Antun (2020). "In Defense of Their See: The Bishops of Zagreb (1272–1301)". In Josipović, Ivan; Jurković, Miljenko (eds.). Aspice Hunc Opus Mirum: Zbornik Povodom Sedamdesetog Rođendana Nikole Jakšića // Festschrift on the occasion of Nikola jakšić's 70th birthday. International Research Center for Late Antiquity and the Middle Ages, Motovun, University of Zagreb; University of Zadar. pp. 371–384. ISBN 978-953-331-304-7.
- Zsoldos, Attila (2011). Magyarország világi archontológiája, 1000–1301 [Secular Archontology of Hungary, 1000–1301] (in Hungarian). História, MTA Történettudományi Intézete. ISBN 978-963-9627-38-3.

Catholic Church titles
Preceded by Stephen Báncsa	Provost of Pressburg; 1271–1278	Succeeded by Paschasius
Preceded by Nicholas Kán (elected)	Provost of Székesfehérvár; 1279–1287	Succeeded by Theodore Tengerdi
Preceded by Timothy	Bishop of Zagreb; 1287	Succeeded by John
