= Demetrius of Bars =

13th-century Hungarian clergyman

Demetrius
- Provost of Székesfehérvár
- Appointed: 1268
- Term ended: 1277
- Predecessor: Farkas Bejc
- Successor: Thomas
- Other post: Archdeacon of Bars

Personal details
- Died: August 1277

Demetrius (Hungarian: Demeter; died August 1277) was a Hungarian clergyman in the 13th century, a loyal supporter of King Béla IV of Hungary.

== Béla's envoy ==
Demetrius was archdeacon of Bars at least from 1263 to 1267. When King Béla's relationship with his oldest son and heir, Stephen, became tense in the early 1260s, he supported the elderly monarch. Timothy was appointed as Bishop of Zagreb by Pope Urban IV in September 1263. Béla IV protested against the pope's decision and sent a royal delegation led by his loyal clergyman Demetrius to Rome in October 1265 to attempt to invalidate Timothy's confirmation. There, Demetrius expressed Timothy's incompetence before the Roman Curia, arguing with his lowborn social status. Pope Clement IV was outraged by the archdeacon's claim and disrespectful tone and refused his request. Béla sent his envoy Demetrius in April 1266, but Pope Clement did not change his decision. To indicate his goodwill, he appointed Demetrius as papal chaplain. Following that Béla IV abandoned the case and acknowledged Timothy's election.

At the same time, Smaragd of Kalocsa was murdered in mid-1265. Some members of the chapter elected Demetrius as their new archbishop. When he resided in Italy for the purposes of the diplomatic mission discussed above, other canons of the chapter elected Stephen Báncsa as archbishop, neglecting the previous procedure. Báncsa, who supported Duke Stephen's efforts, was the nephew of the namesake cardinal, a long-time opponent of King Béla. The dispute was judged over by Pope Clement, who asked for evidences from both parties by 6 December 1266. As the representatives of Demetrius did not present before the Curia, Clement confirmed the election of Báncsa on 11 December 1266. However, after the decision, Demetrius' envoys, provost James and canon Elias appeared in the Roman Curia to complain the confirmation, citing Báncsa's young age, "illiteracy" and the "unlawful method" of the election. Clement commissioned three cardinals, John of Toledo, Matteo Rosso Orsini and Guillaume de Bray to investigate the case, who found the charges regarding the allegations of his minor age against Báncsa was unfounded. In his judgment letter on 11 February 1267, Pope Clement explained Báncsa's erudition and science skills at length (mentioning his studies at Bologna) and maintained his decision, while ordered Demetrius and his representatives to "eternal silence".

== Provostry ==
Despite his failures, Demetrius did not fall out of Béla's mercy, who has constantly lost his supporters by the end of his reign. He was elected provost of Székesfehérvár in 1268. His election was confirmed by Pope Clement just before his death. Beside that, Demetrius served as vice-chancellor in the royal court from that year until Béla's death in May 1270. Following that, when Stephen V succeeded his father, he lost all political and courtly influence for years. In early 1277, Demetrius regained his former position, when the late Béla's former supporters, the Kőszegi–Gutkeled baronial group returned to power. He still held the office, when the minor Ladislaus IV was declared to be of age at an assembly in May. As part of a six-member delegation, Demetrius represented Ladislaus IV in Vienna in July 1277, when the king entered into an alliance with Rudolf I of Germany against Ottokar II of Bohemia. Demetrius soon died, as he was succeeded as Thomas as provost around August or September 1277.

== Sources ==
- Kiss, Gergely (2015). Dél-Magyarországtól Itáliáig. Báncsa nembeli István (1205 k. – 1270) váci püspök, esztergomi érsek, az első magyarországi bíboros életpályája [From Southern Hungary to Italy: The Life and Career of Stephen from the Kindred Báncsa (c. 1205–1270), Bishop of Vác, Archbishop of Esztergom, the First Cardinal from Hungary] (in Hungarian). Kronosz Kiadó. ISBN 978-615-5497-63-6.
- Udvardy, József (1991). A kalocsai érsekek életrajza (1000–1526) [Biographies of Archbishops of Kalocsa, 1000–1526] (in Hungarian). Görres Gesellschaft.
- Rudolf, Veronika (2023). Közép-Európa a hosszú 13. században [Central Europe in the Long 13th Century] (in Hungarian). Arpadiana XV., Research Centre for the Humanities. ISBN 978-963-416-406-7.
- Zsoldos, Attila (2011). Magyarország világi archontológiája, 1000–1301 [Secular Archontology of Hungary, 1000–1301] (in Hungarian). História, MTA Történettudományi Intézete. ISBN 978-963-9627-38-3.

Catholic Church titles
Preceded by Farkas Bejc	Provost of Székesfehérvár; 1268–1277	Succeeded by Thomas (elected)
Political offices
Preceded by Farkas Bejc	Vice-chancellor; 1268–1270	Succeeded by Benedict
Preceded by Nicholas Kán	Vice-chancellor; 1277	Succeeded by John Hont-Pázmány
