= John (bishop of Zagreb) =

- Bishop of Zagreb
- Appointed: 1288
- Term ended: 13 October 1295
- Predecessor: Anthony
- Successor: Michael Bő
- Other post: Provost of Zagreb

Personal details
- Died: 13 October 1295

John (Hungarian: János, Croatian: Ivan; died 13 October 1295) was a prelate in the 13th century, who served as Bishop of Zagreb from 1288 until his death.

== Bishop of Zagreb ==
Prior to his election as bishop, John functioned as provost of cathedral chapter of Zagreb. Sometime after November 1287, when his predecessor Anthony died, John was elected Bishop of Zagreb. He is first mentioned in this capacity in 1288. According to Antun Nekić, it is plausible he was candidate of the local clergy during the election. The historian considers his candidacy, because of their frequent cooperation in the upcoming years, was supported by the powerful Babonić family, who began to extend their influence to the territory of Lower Slavonia in those years, and even took control over the Cistercian monastery of Topusko. Otherwise it is also possible that John's election was conducted by the chapter independently of all spheres of national or regional powers. In this case, John's open collaboration with the Babonići may have been a consequence of his realization of his weekly situation and the need for local elites to protect his diocese and its possessions effectively.

Earlier historiography, for instance the works of Baltazar Adam Krčelić, incorrectly claimed that John, being as partisan of the Capetian House of Anjou (claimants to the Hungarian–Croatian throne), was constantly embroiled in conflict with the cathedral chapter, which supported King Andrew III of Hungary. However, this assumption is not confirmed by contemporary sources. Referring to the 14th-century John, the Archdeacon of Gorica as his source, Krčelić claimed that Bishop John usurped and confiscated church benefices from the chapter. However, the chronicler makes no such mention, he simply notes that during the time of John there were many losses to the church and to the chapter itself. John was among those prelates, who participated in Andrew's campaign against the Duchy of Austria in the summer of 1291. He was present, when the Hungarian and Austrian delegations concluded a truce at Pressburg in late August 1291.

During his episcopate, John maintained a close relationship with the Babonići through their familiaris Grdun (or Gárdony), a distinguished nobleman in Slavonia from a namesake kindred. The first appearance of their cooperation occurred in 1289, when John complained that Ugrin, the castellan of Garić or Garics (Podgaric) plundered church estates, including Čazma. Grdun lent sum of 30 silver marks to the bishopric in exchange for certain lands. By the next year (1290), Grdun entered the service of John, when he was mentioned as castellan of Medvedgrad and Blaguša (Blagosa), both episcopal castles. In June 1291, Grdun handed over Medvedgrad to Andrew III. Bishop John, who appears to have been in constant financial difficulties, was unable to formulate an advocacy policy at the royal court and was gradually subordinated to the private interests of the local oligarchs. For instance, he also lost the estate Hrastovica in favor of Radoslav Babonić during a lawsuit in September 1292. John was also forced to hand over large portions in church estates of Vaška, Gvešće and Lubena to local nobles as church prediales. According to historian Antun Nekić, John's episcopal activity was characterized by the gradual narrowing of the margin of maneuver; as a local clergyman, he could not develop a wide network among ecclesiastical circles. John died on 13 October 1295.

== Sources ==
- Dobronić, Lelja (1995). "Ivan [John]". In Franko, Mirošević (ed.). Zagrebački biskupi i nadbiskupi [Bishops and Archbishops of Zagreb] (in Croatian). Školska knjiga. pp. 85–87. ISBN 953-0-60597-8.
- Nekić, Antun (2020). "In Defense of Their See: The Bishops of Zagreb (1272–1301)". In Josipović, Ivan; Jurković, Miljenko (eds.). Aspice Hunc Opus Mirum: Zbornik Povodom Sedamdesetog Rođendana Nikole Jakšića // Festschrift on the occasion of Nikola jakšić's 70th birthday. International Research Center for Late Antiquity and the Middle Ages, Motovun, University of Zagreb; University of Zadar. pp. 371–384. ISBN 978-953-331-304-7.
- Rudolf, Veronika (2023). Közép-Európa a hosszú 13. században [Central Europe in the Long 13th Century] (in Hungarian). Arpadiana XV., Research Centre for the Humanities. ISBN 978-963-416-406-7.
- Zsoldos, Attila (2011). Magyarország világi archontológiája, 1000–1301 [Secular Archontology of Hungary, 1000–1301] (in Hungarian). História, MTA Történettudományi Intézete. ISBN 978-963-9627-38-3.

Catholic Church titles
Preceded by Anthony	Bishop of Zagreb; 1288–1295	Succeeded by Michael Bő
