= Belá, Nové Zámky District =

Belá Béla
- Municipality
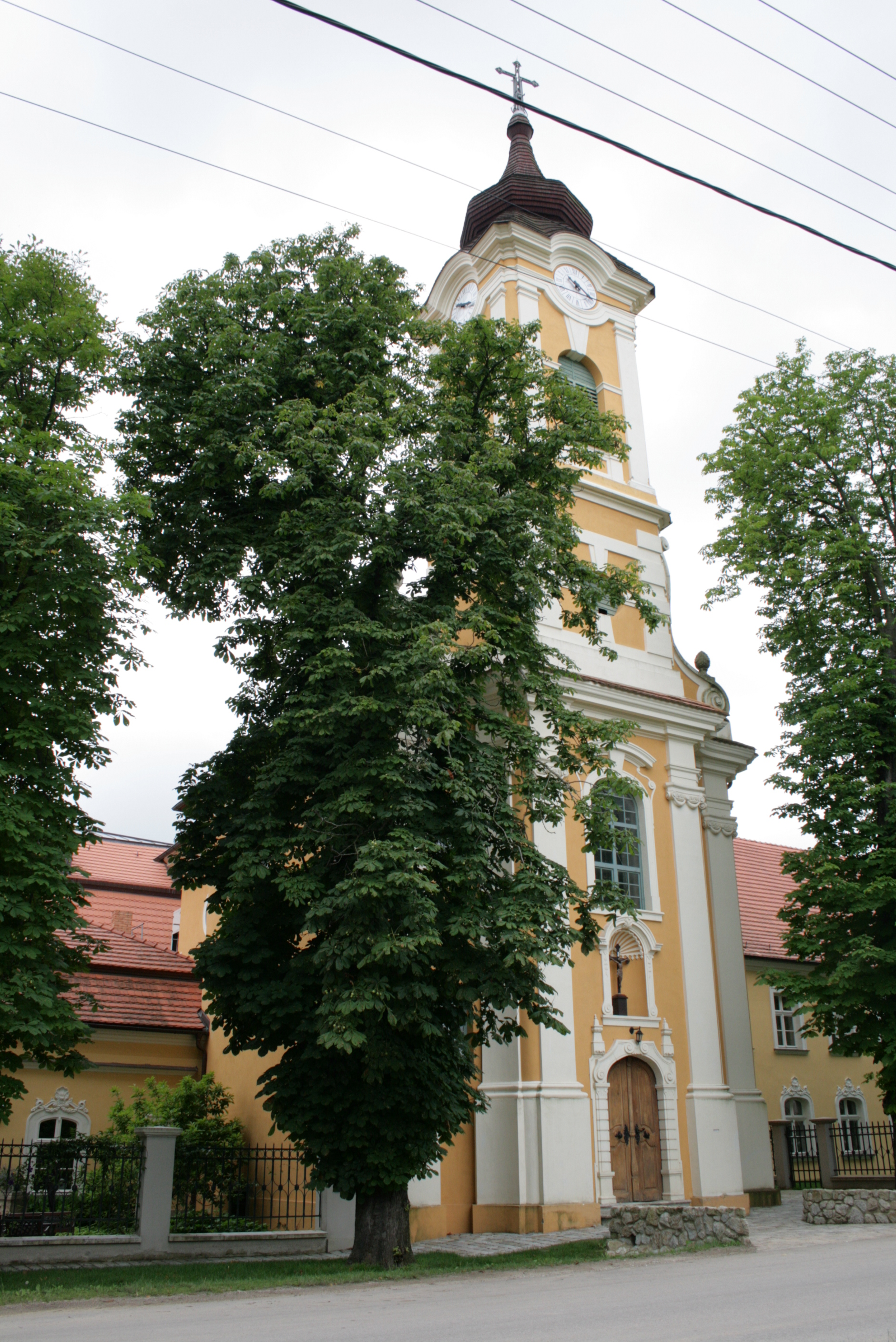

- Flag

- Location of Belá in the Nitra Region Location of Belá in Slovakia
- Coordinates: 47.83°N 18.60°E
- Country: Slovakia
- Region: Nitra Region
- District: Nové Zámky District
- First mentioned: 1138

Area
  - Total: 8.69 km^{2} (3.36 sq mi)
- Elevation: 186 m (610 ft)

Population (2025)
  - Total: 319
- Time zone: UTC+1 (CET)
  - Summer (DST): UTC+2 (CEST)
- Postal code: 943 53
- Area code: +421 36
- Vehicle registration plate (until 2022): NZ
- Website: www.obec-bela.sk

Belá (Hungarian: Béla) is a municipality and village in the Nové Zámky District in the Nitra Region of south-west Slovakia.

== History ==
In historical records the village was first mentioned in 1138.

== Geography ==
The municipality lies at an altitude of 186 metres (610 ft) and covers an area of 8.69 km^{2} (3.36 sq mi) (2025).

== Population ==
Population statistic (10 years)
Year	1995	2005	2015	2025
Count	420	412	344	319
Difference		−1.90%	−16.50%	−7.26%

Population statistic
Year	2024	2025
Count	315	319
Difference		+1.26%

It has a population of 319 people (31 December 2025).

=== Ethnicity ===
Census 2021 (1+ %)
Ethnicity	Number	Fraction
Hungarian	244	75.07%
Slovak	87	26.76%
Not found out	37	11.38%
Total	325	

In year 2021 was 325 people by ethnicity 244 as Hungarian, 87 as Slovak, 37 as Not found out, 3 as Canadian, 2 as Czech, 1 as Austrian and 1 as Other.

Note on population: The difference values of population numbers in the table "Population statistic" and in the sections "Ethnicity" & "Religion" is caused by the use of various statistical methods.

=== Religion ===
Census 2021 (1+ %)
Religion	Number	Fraction
Roman Catholic Church	221	68%
None	72	22.15%
Not found out	22	6.77%
Calvinist Church	5	1.54%
Total	325	

In year 2021 was 325 people by religion 221 from Roman Catholic Church, 72 from None, 22 from Not found out, 5 from Calvinist Church, 2 from Christian Congregations in Slovakia, 1 from Other and not ascertained christian church, 1 from Evangelical Church and 1 from Buddhism.

== Facilities ==
The village has a public library and football pitch.

== Genealogical resources ==
The records for genealogical research are available at the state archive "Statny Archiv in Nitra, Slovakia"

- Roman Catholic church records (births/marriages/deaths): 1711-1898 (parish B)

== See also ==
- List of municipalities and towns in Slovakia
