= Belince =

Village and municipality in Slovakia

Belince Belinc
- Municipality
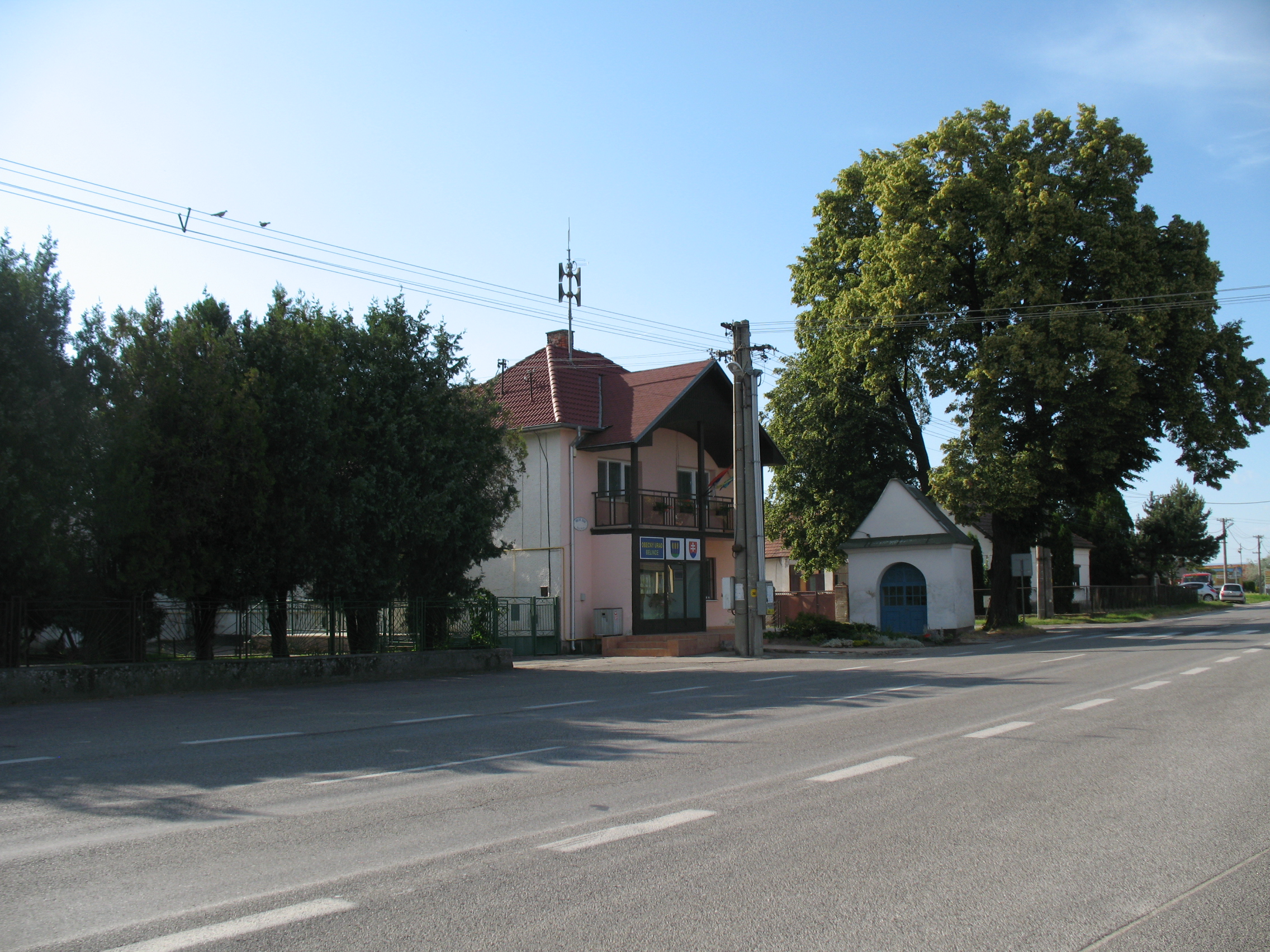

- Flag

- Location of Belince in the Nitra Region Location of Belince in Slovakia
- Coordinates: 48.47°N 18.10°E
- Country: Slovakia
- Region: Nitra Region
- District: Topoľčany District
- First mentioned: 1318

Area
  - Total: 2.09 km^{2} (0.81 sq mi)
- Elevation: 161 m (528 ft)

Population (2025)
  - Total: 378
- Time zone: UTC+1 (CET)
  - Summer (DST): UTC+2 (CEST)
- Postal code: 956 12
- Area code: +421 38
- Vehicle registration plate (until 2022): TO
- Website: www.obecbelince.sk

Belince (Hungarian: Belinc) is a village and municipality in the Topoľčany District of the Nitra Region, Slovakia. In 2011 the village had 316 inhabitants.

== Geography ==
The municipality lies at an altitude of 161 metres (528 ft) and covers an area of 2.09 km^{2} (0.81 sq mi) (2025).

== Population ==
Population statistic (10 years)
Year	1995	2005	2015	2025
Count	266	273	318	378
Difference		+2.63%	+16.48%	+18.86%

Population statistic
Year	2024	2025
Count	376	378
Difference		+0.53%

It has a population of 378 people (31 December 2025).

=== Ethnicity ===
Census 2021 (1+ %)
Ethnicity	Number	Fraction
Slovak	351	96.42%
Not found out	9	2.47%
Total	364	

In year 2021 was 364 people by ethnicity 351 as Slovak, 9 as Not found out, 3 as Romanian, 3 as German, 2 as Russian, 2 as Hungarian and 1 as Czech.

Note on population: The difference values of population numbers in the table "Population statistic" and in the sections "Ethnicity" & "Religion" is caused by the use of various statistical methods.

=== Religion ===
Census 2021 (1+ %)
Religion	Number	Fraction
Roman Catholic Church	272	74.73%
None	57	15.66%
Not found out	15	4.12%
Evangelical Church	8	2.2%
Paganism and natural spirituality	4	1.1%
Greek Catholic Church	4	1.1%
Total	364	

In year 2021 was 364 people by religion 272 from Roman Catholic Church, 57 from None, 15 from Not found out, 8 from Evangelical Church, 4 from Paganism and natural spirituality, 4 from Greek Catholic Church, 2 from Ad hoc movements, 1 from Calvinist Church and 1 from Other.

== Genealogical resources ==
The records for genealogical research are available at the state archive "Statny Archiv in Nitra, Slovakia"

- Roman Catholic church records (births/marriages/deaths): 1696-1896 (parish B)

== See also ==
- List of municipalities and towns in Slovakia
