= Pravenec =

- Municipality
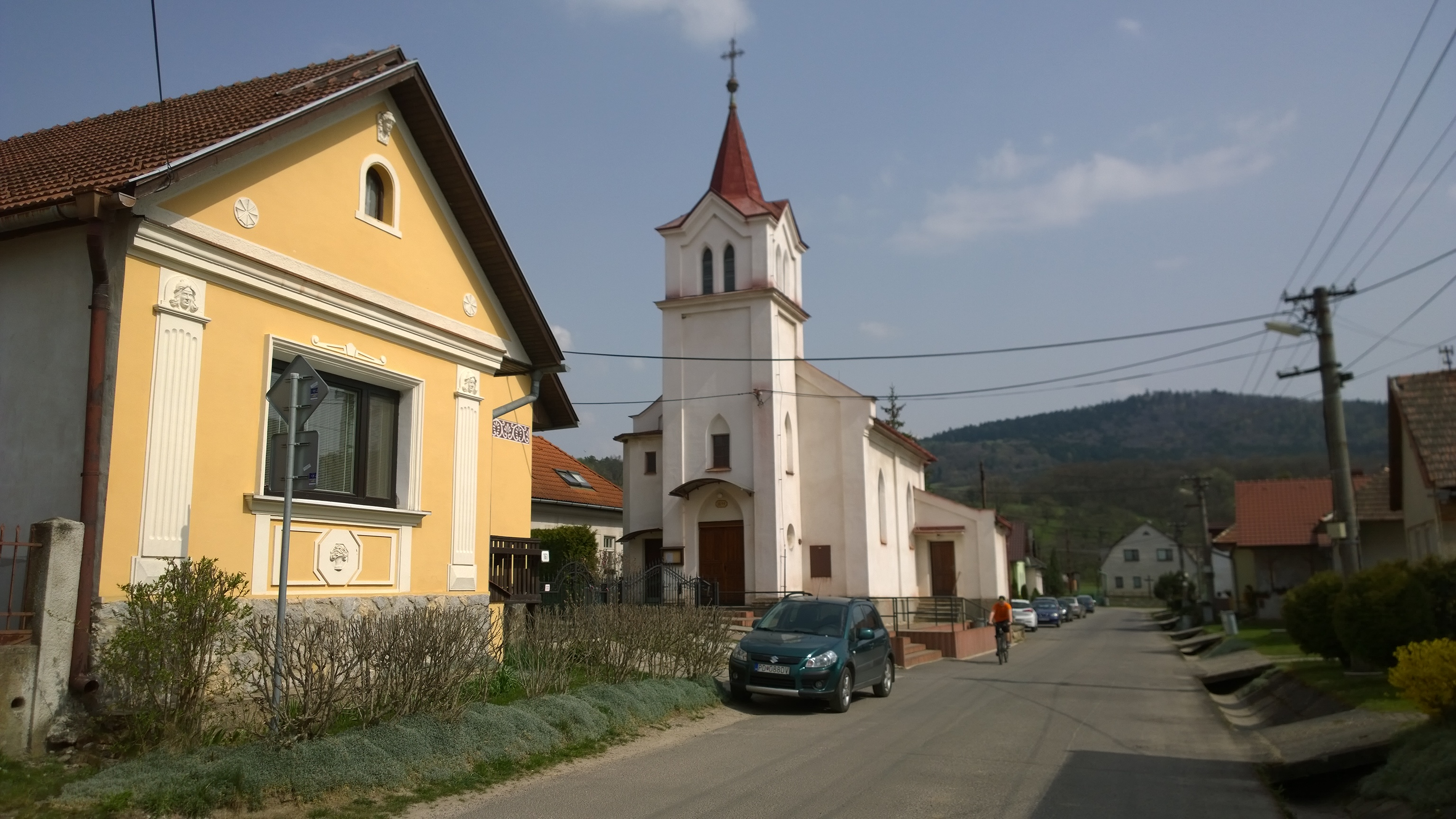

- Flag

- Location of Pravenec in the Trenčín Region Location of Pravenec in Slovakia
- Coordinates: 48.85°N 18.65°E
- Country: Slovakia
- Region: Trenčín Region
- District: Prievidza District
- First mentioned: 1267

Area
  - Total: 10.79 km^{2} (4.17 sq mi)
- Elevation: 324 m (1,063 ft)

Population (2025)
  - Total: 1,285
- Time zone: UTC+1 (CET)
  - Summer (DST): UTC+2 (CEST)
- Postal code: 972 16
- Area code: +421 46
- Vehicle registration plate (until 2022): PD
- Website: www.obecpravenec.sk

Pravenec (Hungarian: Kispróna) is a village and municipality in Prievidza District in the Trenčín Region of western Slovakia.

== History ==
In historical records the village was first mentioned in 1267. Pravenec is thus one of the oldest settlements in the region and dates back to Great Moravia. Today it is composed of two parts separated by approximately 800 meters of grassland and forest. Located further north is the historical part with a renaissance manor-house protected by certificate of immunity as well as a baroque mansion. In the time period around 1640 Pravenec was part of the Bojnice lordship.

The new part of Pravenec was founded in the 1940s shortly after the Baťa woodworking factory was established.

== Geography ==
The municipality lies at an altitude of 325 metres and covers an area of 10.794 km^{2}. It has a population of about 1,241 people.

== Geography ==
The municipality lies at an altitude of 324 metres (1,063 ft) and covers an area of 10.79 km^{2} (4.17 sq mi) (2025).

== Population ==
Population statistic (10 years)
Year	1995	2005	2015	2025
Count	1198	1184	1327	1285
Difference		−1.16%	+12.07%	−3.16%

Population statistic
Year	2024	2025
Count	1283	1285
Difference		+0.15%

It has a population of 1285 people (31 December 2025).

=== Ethnicity ===
Census 2021 (1+ %)
Ethnicity	Number	Fraction
Slovak	1219	93.4%
Not found out	66	5.05%
Total	1305	

In year 2021 was 1305 people by ethnicity 1219 as Slovak, 66 as Not found out, 12 as Hungarian, 9 as Other, 7 as Czech, 4 as Polish, 4 as German, 2 as Romani, 1 as Ukrainian, 1 as Serbian and 1 as Rusyn.

Note on population: The difference values of population numbers in the table "Population statistic" and in the sections "Ethnicity" & "Religion" is caused by the use of various statistical methods.

=== Religion ===
Census 2021 (1+ %)
Religion	Number	Fraction
Roman Catholic Church	771	59.08%
None	406	31.11%
Not found out	72	5.52%
Evangelical Church	18	1.38%
Total	1305	

In year 2021 was 1305 people by religion 771 from Roman Catholic Church, 406 from None, 72 from Not found out, 18 from Evangelical Church, 9 from Christian Congregations in Slovakia, 8 from Greek Catholic Church, 6 from Ad hoc movements, 3 from Calvinist Church, 3 from Other, 2 from Paganism and natural spirituality, 2 from Other and not ascertained christian church, 1 from Jewish community, 1 from Eastern Orthodox Church, 1 from Islam, 1 from United Methodist Church and 1 from Buddhism.
