= Práznovce =

Municipality in Slovakia

Práznovce Práznóc
- Municipality
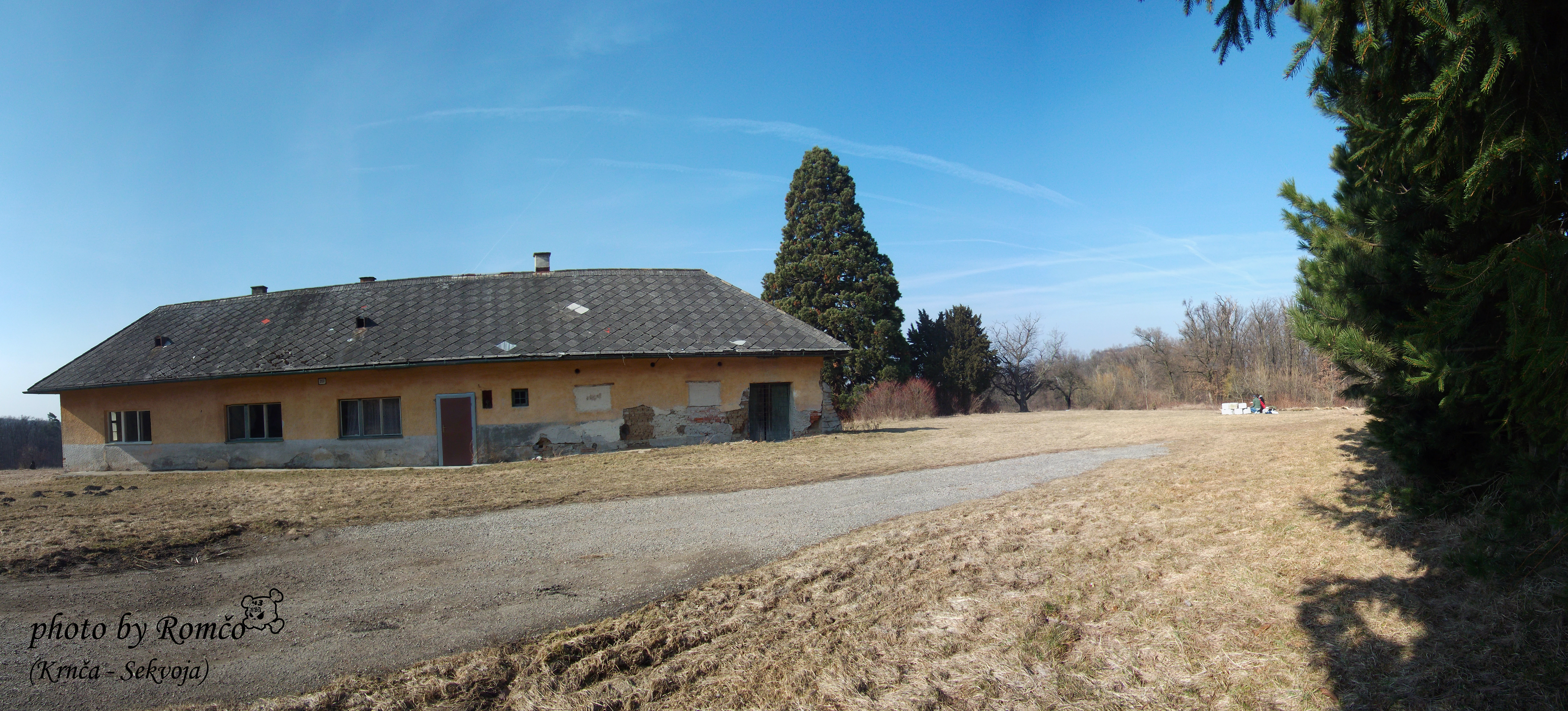

- Flag

- Location of Práznovce in the Nitra Region Location of Práznovce in Slovakia
- Coordinates: 48.57°N 18.21°E
- Country: Slovakia
- Region: Nitra Region
- District: Topoľčany District
- First mentioned: 1183

Area
  - Total: 11.43 km^{2} (4.41 sq mi)
- Elevation: 168 m (551 ft)

Population (2025)
  - Total: 967
- Time zone: UTC+1 (CET)
  - Summer (DST): UTC+2 (CEST)
- Postal code: 955 01
- Area code: +421 38
- Vehicle registration plate (until 2022): TO
- Website: www.praznovce.sk

Práznovce (Hungarian: Práznóc) is a municipality in the Topoľčany District of the Nitra Region, Slovakia. In 2011 it had 962 inhabitants.

== Geography ==
The municipality lies at an altitude of 168 metres (551 ft) and covers an area of 11.43 km^{2} (4.41 sq mi) (2025).

== Population ==
Population statistic (10 years)
| Year | 1995 | 2005 | 2015 | 2025 |
|---|---|---|---|---|
| Count | 0 | 968 | 961 | 967 |
| Difference | | – | −0.72% | +0.62% |

Population statistic
| Year | 2024 | 2025 |
|---|---|---|
| Count | 966 | 967 |
| Difference | | +0.10% |

It has a population of 967 people (31 December 2025).

=== Ethnicity ===
Census 2021 (1+ %)
| Ethnicity | Number | Fraction |
|---|---|---|
| Slovak | 936 | 96.09% |
| Not found out | 30 | 3.08% |
| Total | 974 | |

In year 2021 was 974 people by ethnicity 936 as Slovak, 30 as Not found out, 5 as Czech, 5 as Romani, 3 as Ukrainian, 3 as Russian, 2 as Polish, 1 as Vietnamese, 1 as Italian, 1 as Austrian, 1 as Hungarian, 1 as Other and 1 as French.

Note on population: The difference values of population numbers in the table "Population statistic" and in the sections "Ethnicity" & "Religion" is caused by the use of various statistical methods.

=== Religion ===
Census 2021 (1+ %)
| Religion | Number | Fraction |
|---|---|---|
| Roman Catholic Church | 711 | 73% |
| None | 196 | 20.12% |
| Not found out | 34 | 3.49% |
| Evangelical Church | 15 | 1.54% |
| Christian Congregations in Slovakia | 10 | 1.03% |
| Total | 974 | |

In year 2021 was 974 people by religion 711 from Roman Catholic Church, 196 from None, 34 from Not found out, 15 from Evangelical Church, 10 from Christian Congregations in Slovakia, 3 from Other and not ascertained christian church, 2 from Ad hoc movements, 1 from Islam, 1 from Greek Catholic Church and 1 from Buddhism.
