= Diploma Andreanum =

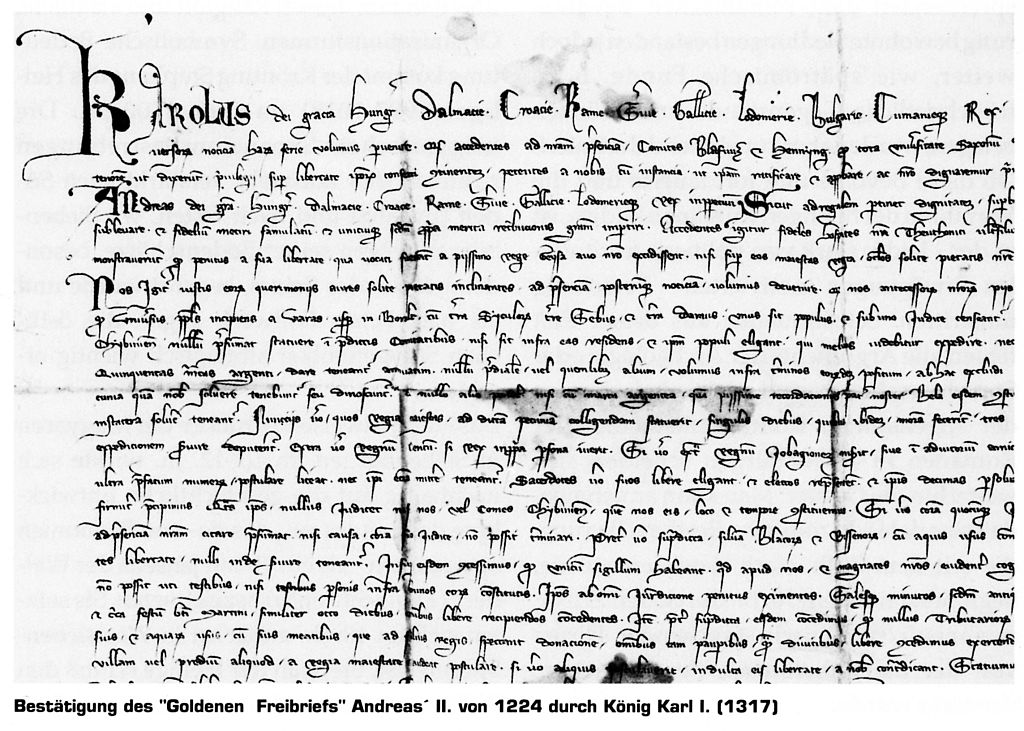
A facsimile of an official acknowledgment issued by Charles I of Hungary in 1317, reasserting the validity of the Diploma Andreanum

The Diploma Andreanum, or Der Goldener Freibrief der Siebenbürger Sachsen (English: Golden Charter of the Transylvanian Saxons), was issued by King Andrew II of Hungary in 1224, granting provisional autonomy to colonial Germans residing in the region of Transylvania (German: Siebenbürgen or Transsilvanien) of the then Kingdom of Hungary, more specifically the present-day area of Sibiu (German: Hermannstadt), central Romania.
