= Káld =

- Coat of arms

- Location of Káld in Hungary
- Coordinates: 47.16313°N 17.04576°E
- Country: Hungary
- Region: Western Transdanubia
- County: Vas
- Subregion: Sárvári
- Rank: Village

Area
  - Total: 42.44 km^{2} (16.39 sq mi)

Population (1 January 2008)
  - Total: 1,093
  - Density: 25.75/km^{2} (66.70/sq mi)
- Time zone: UTC+1 (CET)
  - Summer (DST): UTC+2 (CEST)
- Postal code: 9673
- Area code: +36 95
- KSH code: 29957
- Website: https://kald.hu/

Káld is a village in Vas county, Hungary. It is 16 km from Sárvár and 35 km from Sümeg.
