= Hričovské Podhradie =

Village and municipality in Slovakia

- Municipality
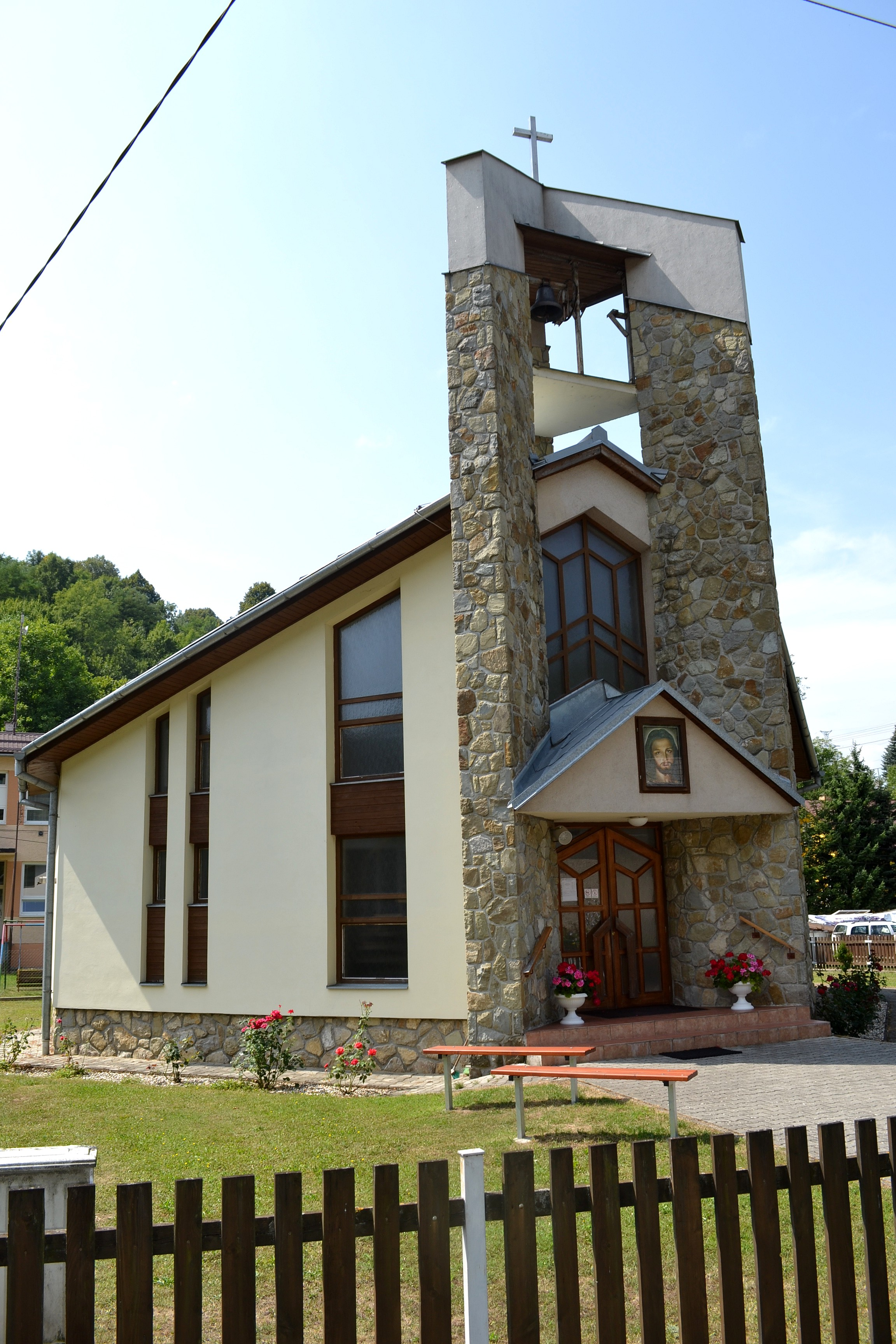

- Flag

- Location of Hričovské Podhradie in the Žilina Region Location of Hričovské Podhradie in Slovakia
- Coordinates: 49.22°N 18.62°E
- Country: Slovakia
- Region: Žilina Region
- District: Žilina District
- First mentioned: 1265

Area
  - Total: 2.04 km^{2} (0.79 sq mi)
- Elevation: 323 m (1,060 ft)

Population (2025)
  - Total: 344
- Time zone: UTC+1 (CET)
  - Summer (DST): UTC+2 (CEST)
- Postal code: 134 1
- Area code: +421 41
- Vehicle registration plate (until 2022): ZA
- Website: www.hricovskepodhradie.sk

Hričovské Podhradie (Hungarian: Ricsóváralja) is a village and municipality in Žilina District in the Žilina Region of northern Slovakia.

== History ==
In historical records the village was first mentioned in 1265.

== Geography ==
The municipality lies at an altitude of 323 metres (1,060 ft) and covers an area of 2.04 km^{2} (0.79 sq mi) (2025).

== Population ==
Population statistic (10 years)
| Year | 1995 | 2005 | 2015 | 2025 |
|---|---|---|---|---|
| Count | 344 | 375 | 359 | 344 |
| Difference | | +9.01% | −4.26% | −4.17% |

Population statistic
| Year | 2024 | 2025 |
|---|---|---|
| Count | 343 | 344 |
| Difference | | +0.29% |

It has a population of 344 people (31 December 2025).

=== Ethnicity ===
Census 2021 (1+ %)
| Ethnicity | Number | Fraction |
|---|---|---|
| Slovak | 348 | 98.3% |
| Not found out | 7 | 1.97% |
| Czech | 4 | 1.12% |
| Total | 354 | |

In year 2021 was 354 people by ethnicity 348 as Slovak, 7 as Not found out, 4 as Czech, 2 as Moravian, 1 as Ukrainian and 1 as Polish.

Note on population: The difference values of population numbers in the table "Population statistic" and in the sections "Ethnicity" & "Religion" is caused by the use of various statistical methods.

=== Religion ===
Census 2021 (1+ %)
| Religion | Number | Fraction |
|---|---|---|
| Roman Catholic Church | 301 | 85.03% |
| None | 38 | 10.73% |
| Not found out | 5 | 1.41% |
| Total | 354 | |

In year 2021 was 354 people by religion 301 from Roman Catholic Church, 38 from None, 5 from Not found out, 3 from Christian Congregations in Slovakia, 1 from Calvinist Church, 1 from Other and not ascertained christian church, 1 from Other, 1 from Greek Catholic Church, 1 from Evangelical Church, 1 from Church of the Brethren and 1 from Baptists Church.

== Genealogical resources ==
The records for genealogical research are available at the state archive "Statny Archiv in Bytca, Slovakia"

- Roman Catholic church records (births/marriages/deaths): 1690-1952 (parish B)

== See also ==
- List of municipalities and towns in Slovakia
