= Rum, Hungary =

Rum
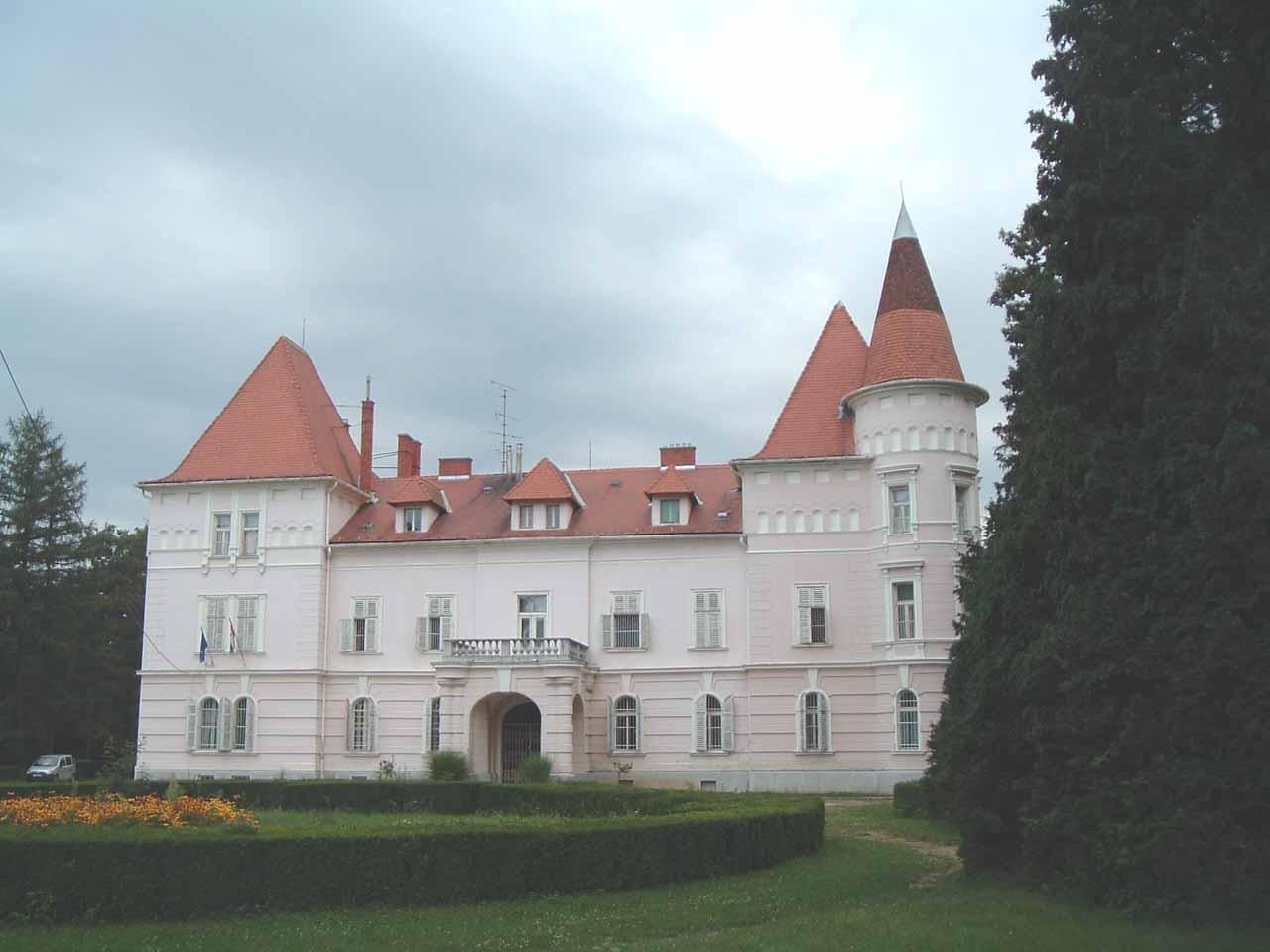

- Seal

- Location of Vas county in Hungary

- Location of Rum, Hungary
- Coordinates: 47.12782°N 16.84421°E
- Country: Hungary
- County: Vas

Government
  - Mayor: Beni Ferenc (Ind.)

Area
  - Total: 16.85 km^{2} (6.51 sq mi)

Population (2022)
  - Total: 1,171
  - Density: 69.50/km^{2} (180.0/sq mi)
- Time zone: UTC+1 (CET)
  - Summer (DST): UTC+2 (CEST)
- Postal code: 9766
- Area code: 94

Rum is a village in Vas county, Hungary.

== Location ==
It is located on the left bank of the Rába, 20 kilometers southeast of Szombathely. The neighboring settlements: Meggyeskovácsi from the north, Kám from the east, Alsóújlak from the south, Püspökmolnári and Zsennye from the southwest, Rábatöttös from the west, and Csempeszkopács from the northwest. Its outskirts extend several kilometers from its center to the south, so it even borders Vasvár in that direction.

== Origin of its name ==
Its name comes from the German person name Ruhm or the family name Rummy.

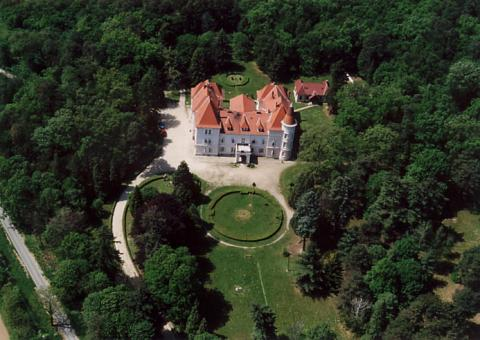
Rum, palace from a bird's eye view
