= Nitra Castle =

Castle in Slovakia

Coordinates: 48°19′6″N 18°5′11″E

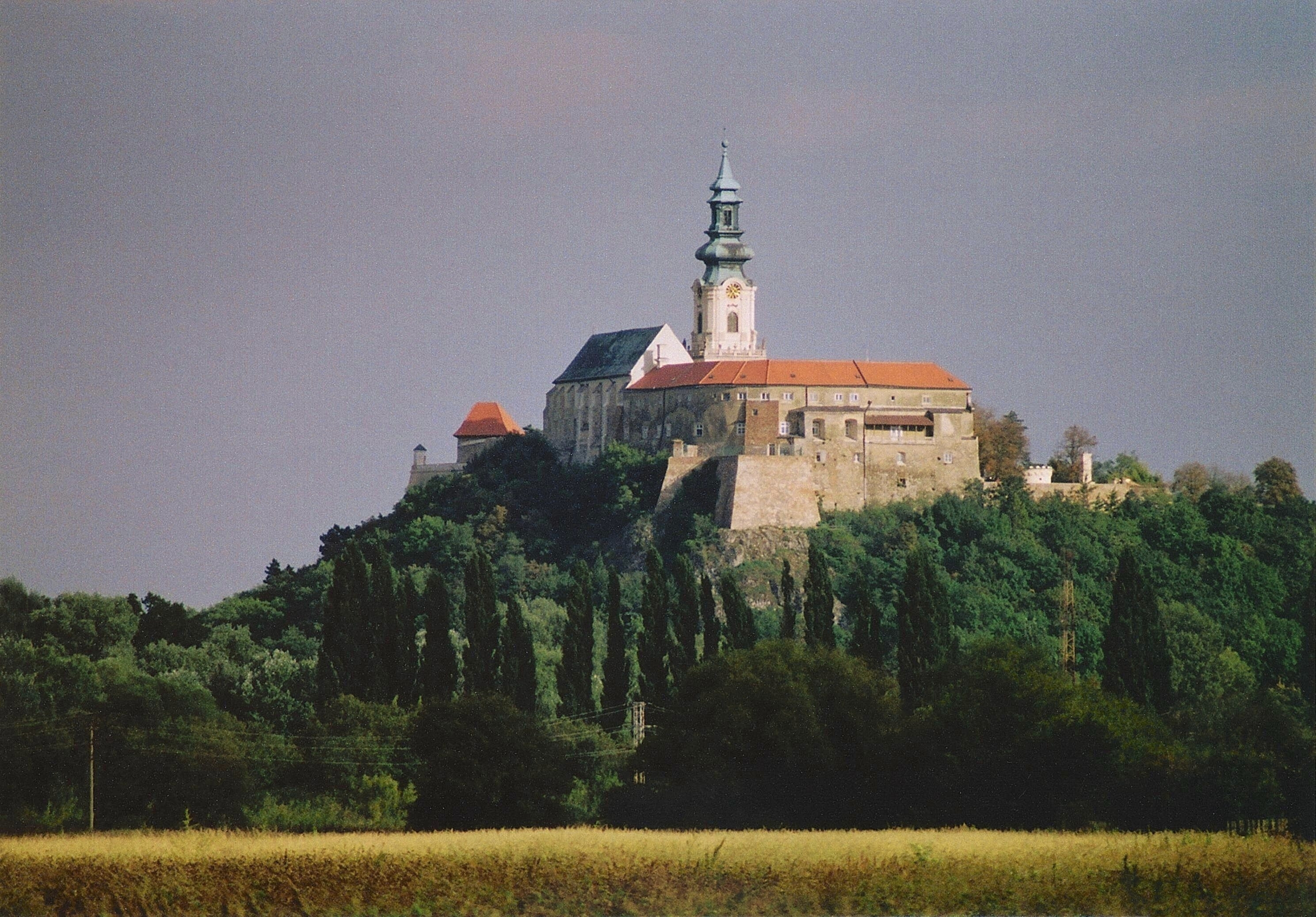
Nitra Castle

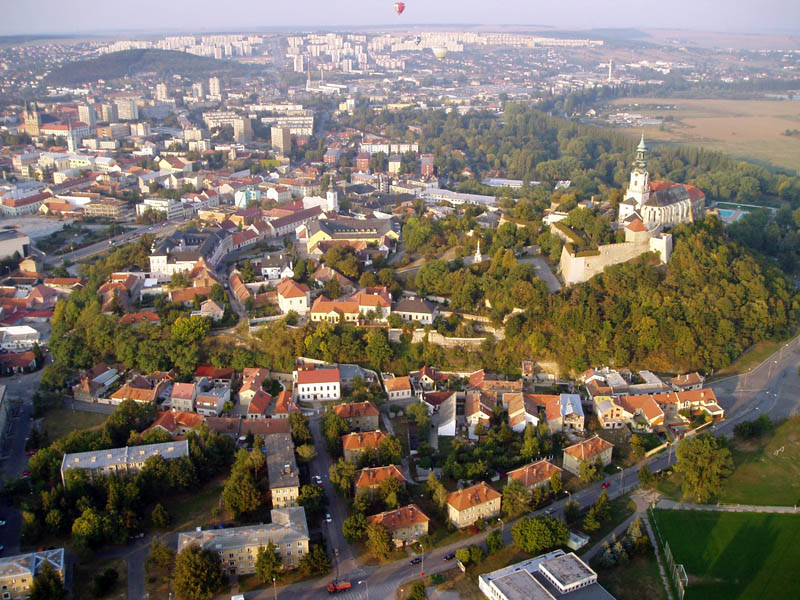
Nitra from above

Nitra Castle (Slovak: Nitriansky hrad, Hungarian: Nyitrai vár) is a castle located in the Old Town of Nitra, Slovakia. It dominates the city and is a national cultural monument. It is the seat of the Diocese of Nitra.

== History ==
The first fortified center on Castle Hill dates back to the Bronze Age (1,600 BCE). In the 1st century BCE, the hill was settled by Celts. After its destruction, the site was abandoned until the early Slavic period (7th-8th centuries) and at least from the turn of the 8th/9th centuries, it was permanently occupied by Slavs. In the first half of the 9th century, the top of the hill was protected by the wooden palisade. In the second half of the same century, the Slavs built a massive rampart made of two outer drystone walls (thickness 2 x 3m) with an internal timber structure filled with earth (3m). The original rampart was destroyed before early 11th century.

The castle was built in the 11th century on the place of an earlier fort. The core of the castle is St. Emmeram's Cathedral with the Bishop's residence; the oldest surviving part is the Romanesque Church of St. Emmeram from the 11th century along with two other parts of the cathedral: the originally Gothic Upper Church from the 14th century and the Lower Church from the 17th century. The originally Gothic Bishop's Palace got its present Late Baroque appearance in the 18th century. There are also surviving parts of the castle fortifications, the majority of which were created in the 16th and 17th centuries and a smaller part from the Middle Ages. The church is currently being remodeled.

== Gallery ==
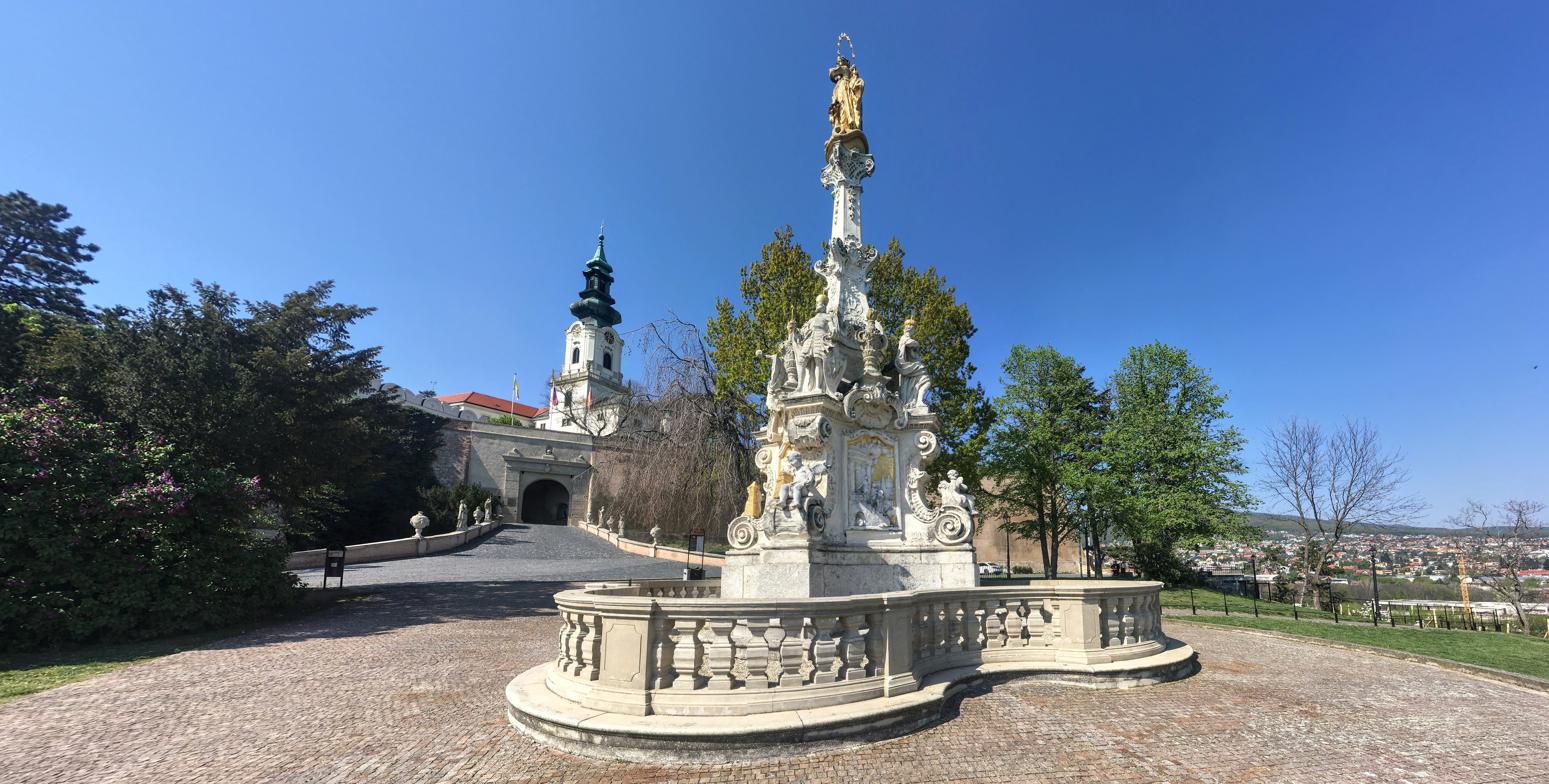

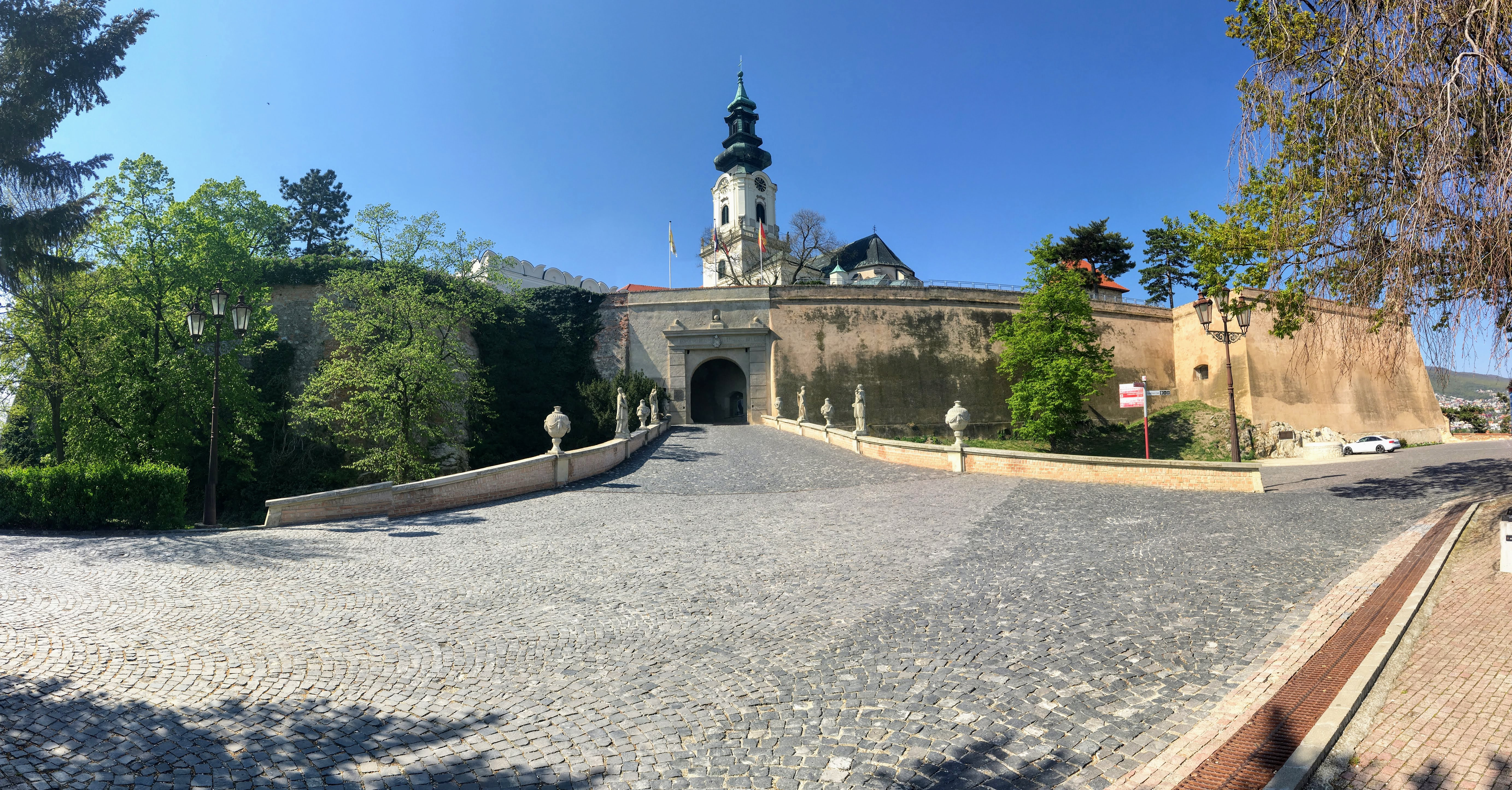

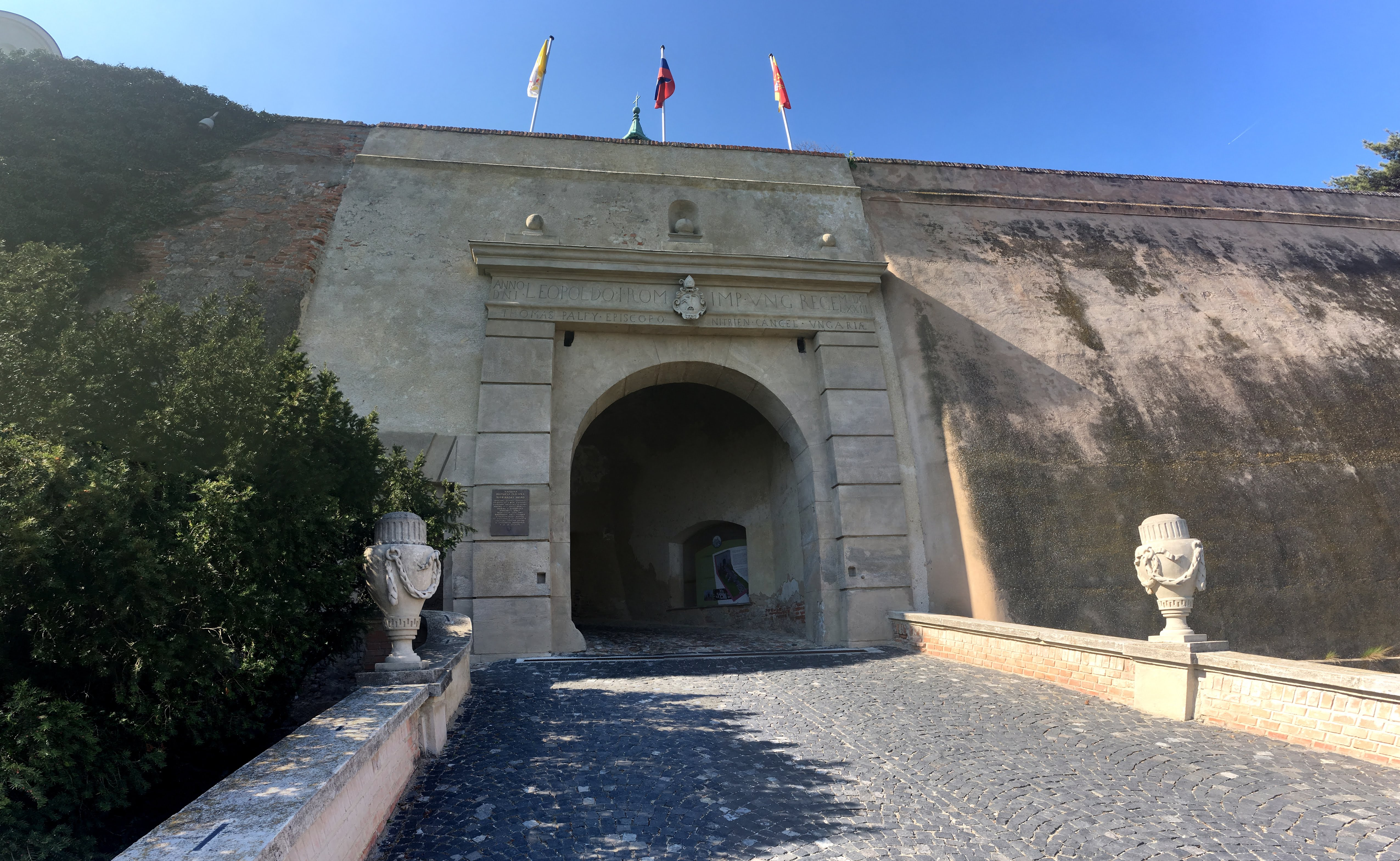

== Bibliography ==
- Turčan, Vladimír (2012). Veľkomoravské hradiská (in Slovak). Bratislava: DAJAMA. ISBN 978-80-8136-013-8.
