= Bejcgyertyános =

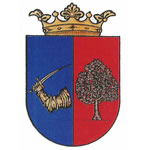
- Coat of arms

- Location of Vas county in Hungary

- Location of Bejcgyertyános
- Coordinates: 47.14873°N 16.92300°E
- Country: Hungary
- County: Vas

Government
  - Mayor: Péntek Enikő (Ind.)

Area
  - Total: 31.43 km^{2} (12.14 sq mi)

Population (2022)
  - Total: 425
  - Density: 13.5/km^{2} (35.0/sq mi)
- Time zone: UTC+1 (CET)
  - Summer (DST): UTC+2 (CEST)
- Postal code: 9683
- Area code: 94

Bejcgyertyános is a village in Vas County, Hungary.

The population of the village taken be censuses was 600 in 1990, 530 in 2001, 450 in 2011, and 425 according to the last census.
