= Mezőpilis =

Hungarian clan

Genus (gens) Mezőpilis
- Country: Kingdom of Hungary
- Founded: early 13th century
- Founder: Bás I (first known)
- Final ruler: John
- Dissolution: 1378/1387
- Cadet branches: House of Mikolai

Mezőpilis (Mezeupylis) was the name of a minor gens (Latin for "clan"; nemzetség in Hungarian) in the Kingdom of Hungary, which mostly possessed lands along the river Garam (Hron) in Upper Hungary (present-day Slovakia).

== Origin ==
The name of the kindred is mentioned only once by a single document in 1293, when Peter, the son of Bás (II), was referred to as "Petrus filius Baas de genere Mezeupylis". According to historian Valéria Tóth, it is plausible that Mezőpilis was a settlement that once existed and the clan was named after that village. The first known member of the kindred is Bás (I), but nothing is known about him apart from his name. He had two sons, Bás (II) and Urka.

== History ==
Bás (II) is the most prestigious member of the kindred. As a confidant of Béla IV of Hungary, he acquired domains in Upper Hungary, including the estate Mikola in Bars County (later Garammikola, present-day a borough of Želiezovce, Slovakia) in 1247, which later became the centre of the Mezőpilis clan's landholdings in the region. Their lands laid mostly in Esztergom, Bars and Hont counties. Bás served as ispán of Trencsén County from 1251 to 1259. In this capacity, he built the castle of Ugróc in the county (present-day ruins near Uhrovec, Slovakia). The surrounding nine villages belonged to its lordship. Bás entered the service of Duke Stephen by 1259. When the duke's relationship worsened with his father King Béla in the 1260s, he initially remained loyal to the duke, even serving as count (head) of Stephen's court from 1263 to 1264. However, shortly before or after the 1264–1265 civil war between father and son, Bás defected to the court of Béla IV. As a result, when Stephen ascended the Hungarian throne in 1270, Bás lost political influence, although the king forgave him. Bás' brother Urka possessed Vezekény and Kural in Esztergom County (present-day Hronovce and Kuraľany in Slovakia, respectively) in 1256. He was styled as steward of the royal estate of Liptó (the core of future Liptó County) and the king's tárnok (treasurer official) in 1269.

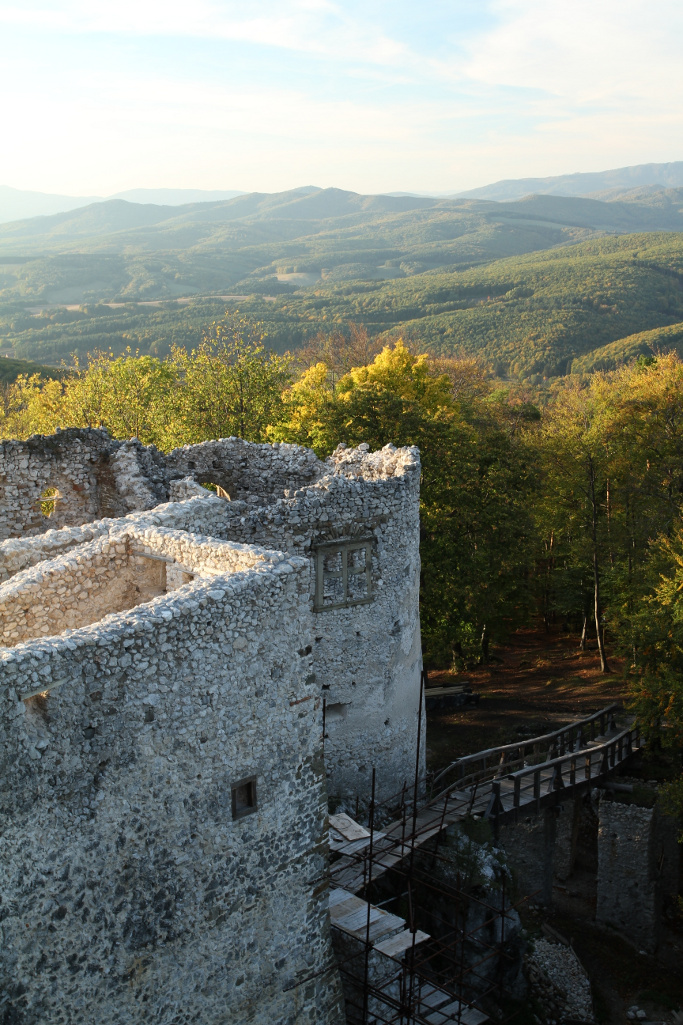
The castle of Uhrovec (Ugróc) in Slovakia, built by Bás Mezőpilis in the 1250s

Peter, the son of Bás (II) appears in contemporary records only in the 1290s, during the reign of Andrew III of Hungary. By that time, his lands and wealth – sharing the fate of the other local lords – were constantly threatened by the aspirations of the powerful oligarch Matthew Csák, who gradually became de facto ruler of Upper Hungary amid the feudal anarchy. In 1293, he complained to the royal court that his estate and manor Mikola was invaded and destroyed by the troops of Matthew. In the same year, he was involved in a lawsuit with his neighbor Seraphin, the provost of Esztergom–Szentgyörgy and archdeacon of the cathedral chapter in Esztergom, who possessed Zselíz (today Želiezovce) over the boundaries. In accordance with the verdict, Peter had to hand over 70 acres of land from his estate Mikola to the provost. At the turn of 1294 and 1295, Peter was forced by Matthew Csák, under an unfavorable contract, to pass his castle Ugróc with its accessories – the villages Podluzsány (Podlužany), Bán (Bánovce nad Bebravou), Nastic, Ugróc (Uhrovec), Bánkóc, Zsitna, Radissa (Žitná-Radiša), Mocsonok (Močenok) and Sonko (Šípkov), today all in Slovakia – in exchange for lands of little value in Bars County, by name Tolmács (Tlmače), Bars (Starý Tekov), Mohi (Mochovce) and Puth. Matthew's familiaris and legal representative Peter Ludány requested the chapter of Esztergom to transcribe the contract between his lord and Peter Mezőpilis in October 1295. Peter's son Nicholas complained to the chapter in June 1297 that the oligarch forced him and his father into the disadvantageous exchange with death threats and violence. Before the chapter of Esztergom, Peter and his son Nicholas settled the case with Peter Ludány (on behalf of his lord) in August 1297: they certified that the Ugróc Castle was sold to Matthew Csák. According to historians Vince Bunyitay and Erik Fügedi, Bartholomew, the Bishop of Várad (1284–1285) was also a son of Bás (II), but others – e.g. Béla Kovács, Pál Engel and Attila Zsoldos – rejected this theory.

Nicholas was the first family member who bore the surname Mikolai. His fate is unknown after 1297. His younger brother was Andrew, whose name is mentioned by contemporary records in the period between 1332 and 1356. During a lawsuit, Judge royal Demetrius Nekcsei returned the estate Orlóc to Andrew in 1332 (which once was possessed by his grandfather Bás). King Charles I of Hungary confirmed the verdict in January 1333. Andrew was involved in various lawsuits and conflicts with his neighbors in the upcoming decades. His only known son was miles John, who married an unidentified daughter of Nicholas, son of Pancras, a burgher of Pest prior to 1360. John was already an impoverished local nobleman, King Louis I of Hungary gave permission to sell his estates due to lack of funds in 1377. John concluded a mutual inheritance contract with Ladislaus Sárói in 1378. John died without descendants sometime before 1387, ending the Mezőpilis line and its branch the Mikolai family. His remaining lands were inherited by Ladislaus Sárói in accordance with the aforementioned document.

== Family tree ==
- Bás (I)
  - Bás (II) (fl. 1247–1272)
    - Peter (fl. 1293–1297)
      - Nicholas (fl. 1297)
      - Andrew (fl. 1332–1356)
        - John (fl. 1360–1378, d. before 1387) ∞ N (fl. 1360)
  - Urka (fl. 1256–1269)

== Sources ==
- Bácsatyai, Dániel (2019). "Kik voltak a tárnokok? [Who Were the Tárnoks?]". In Kádas, István; Skorka, Renáta; Weisz, Boglárka (eds.). Márvány, tárház, adomány. Gazdaságtörténeti tanulmányok a magyar középkorról (in Hungarian). MTA Bölcsészettudományi Kutatóközpont. pp. 13–49. ISBN 978-963-416-179-0.
- Fügedi, Erik (1986). Ispánok, bárók, kiskirályok [Ispáns, Barons and Petty Kings]. Magvető. ISBN 963-14-0582-6.
- Tóth, Valéria (2016). Személynévadás és személynévhasználat az ómagyar korban [Personal naming and use of personal names in the Old Hungarian period] (in Hungarian). A Magyar Névarchívum Kiadványai 38., Debreceni Egyetemi Kiadó. ISBN 978-963-318-572-8.
- Wertner, Mór (1897). "Garam-Mikolai Bás országbíró [Judge royal Bás of Garam-Mikola]". Századok (in Hungarian). 31 (1). Magyar Történelmi Társulat: 39–43. ISSN 0039-8098.
- Zsoldos, Attila (2011). Magyarország világi archontológiája, 1000–1301 [Secular Archontology of Hungary, 1000–1301] (in Hungarian). História, MTA Történettudományi Intézete. ISBN 978-963-9627-38-3.
