= Bartholomew (bishop of Várad) =

Hungarian prelate

- Bishop of Várad
- Installed: 1284
- Term ended: 1285
- Predecessor: Thomas
- Successor: Benedict
- Other posts: Provost of Eger; Provost of Szepes; Vice-chancellor

Personal details
- Died: after 1285
- Denomination: Roman Catholic
- Parents: Bot
- Education: University of Bologna

Bartholomew (Hungarian: Bertalan; died after 1285) was a Hungarian prelate in the second half of the 13th century, who served as Bishop of Várad (present-day Oradea, Romania) from 1284 to 1285.

== Family and early life ==
Bartholomew was born into a noble family – it is known as Tekesh's kinship in Hungarian historiography – which possessed landholdings in Sáros County. His father was Bot (or Both). He had a brother Benedict. His uncle was Tekesh, a powerful ispán of Sáros County. One of his cousins was Stephen, son of Tekesh. Formerly, historians Vince Bunyitay and Erik Fügedi claimed that Bartholomew originated from the gens (clan) Mezőpilis as the son of Bás (II).

Bartholomew attended the University of Bologna. According to a record, he bought a codex which contains the notes of Accursius for 42 bolognini and 10 soldi in September 1265.

== Career ==
The name of Bartholomew is first mentioned by contemporary records in Hungary in 1274, on the occasion of a land contract along with his relatives. Sometime after 1276, he was elected provost of Eger. He is mentioned in this capacity from 1278 to 1279. He was styled as special royal notary in 1279 too. He was succeeded as provost by Haab in 1280. Bartholomew was made vice-chancellor of the royal court sometime in the first half of 1280. His appointment took place after a group of barons captured King Ladislaus IV of Hungary, who had earlier imprisoned papal legate Philip of Fermo. At that time, Matthew Csák and Finta Aba dominated the royal council – the Tekesh kinship enjoyed the patronage of the latter, for instance Bartholomew's cousin, Stephen was Voivode of Transylvania at the same time. Bartholomew was replaced as vice-chancellor by Acho, a confidant of Ladislaus IV in the spring of 1281.

Sometime between September 1281 and March 1282, Bartholomew was re-installed as vice-chancellor. He held the position until 1284. Beside that, he functioned as provost of Szepes (today Spišská Kapitula in Spišské Podhradie, Slovakia) from 1283 to 1284. In this capacity, he returned the estate Szék (present-day Slatvina, Slovakia) to the chapter. Bartholomew served as Bishop of Várad from 1284 at least until 1285. His successor Benedict appears in this dignity since only 1287. Bartholomew acted as judge in various trials by ordeal in Bihar County.

== Sources ==
- Bácsatyai, Dániel (2021). "A 13. századi uralkodói nagy- és kettőspecsétek kronológiája [Chronology of 13th-century royal grand and double seals in Hungary]". Turul (in Hungarian). 94 (1): 1–22. ISSN 1216-7258.
- Haraszti Szabó, Péter; Kelényi, Borbála (2019). Magyarországi diákok francia, angol, itáliai és német egyetemeken a középkorban, 1100–1526 [Students from Hungary at the Universities of France, England, Italy and Germany in the Middle Ages 1100–1526] (in Hungarian). ELTE Egyetemi Könyvtár és Levéltár; MTA ELTE Egyetemtörténeti Kutatócsoport. ISBN 978-963-489-098-0.
- Kiss, Gergely (2021). "Egy ismeretlen ismerős a 13–14. század fordulójáról: Haab [A Familiar Stranger from the Turn of the 13th‒14th Centuries: Haab]". Pontes (in Hungarian). 4. PTE BTK Történettudományi Intézet: 110–130. ISSN 2631-0015.
- Labanc, Peter (2011). Spišskí prepošti do roku 1405 [Scepusian provosts till 1405 (in Slovak). University of Trnava. ISBN 978-83-7490-440-7.
- Zsoldos, Attila (2011). Magyarország világi archontológiája, 1000–1301 [Secular Archontology of Hungary, 1000–1301] (in Hungarian). História, MTA Történettudományi Intézete. ISBN 978-963-9627-38-3.

Catholic Church titles
Preceded by Michael	Provost of Eger; 1278–1279	Succeeded by Haab
Preceded by Lucas	Provost of Szepes; 1283–1284	Succeeded by James
Preceded by Thomas	Bishop of Várad; 1284–1285	Succeeded by Benedict
Political offices
Preceded by Acho	Vice-chancellor; 1280–1281	Succeeded by Acho
Preceded by Acho	Vice-chancellor; 1282–1284	Succeeded by Theodore Tengerdi
