= Hubovo =

Village and municipality in Slovakia

Hubovo Hubó
- Municipality
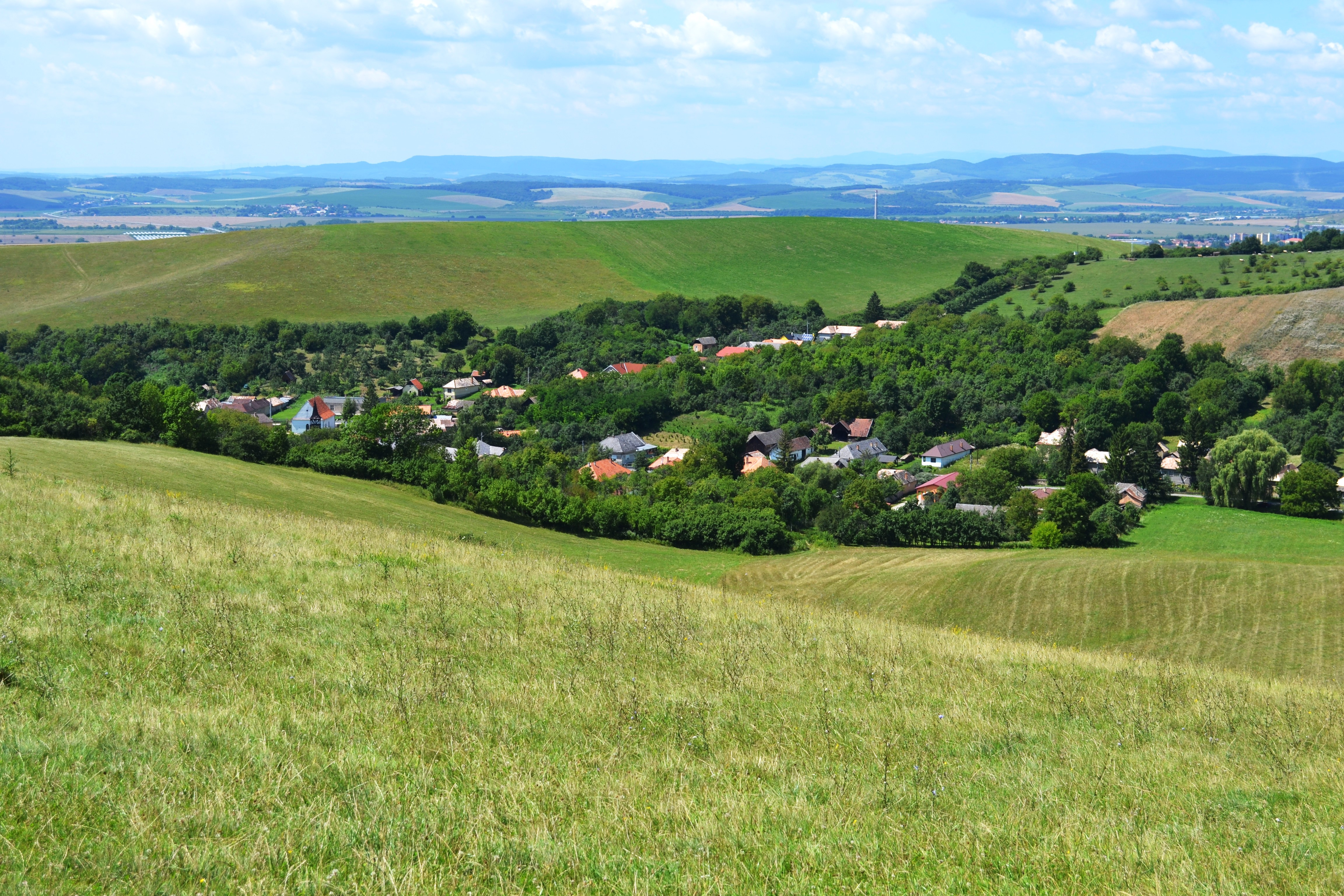

- Flag

- Location of Hubovo in the Banská Bystrica Region Location of Hubovo in Slovakia
- Coordinates: 48.40°N 20.37°E
- Country: Slovakia
- Region: Banská Bystrica Region
- District: Rimavská Sobota District
- First mentioned: 1235

Area
  - Total: 11.08 km^{2} (4.28 sq mi)
- Elevation: 233 m (764 ft)

Population (2025)
  - Total: 111
- Time zone: UTC+1 (CET)
  - Summer (DST): UTC+2 (CEST)
- Postal code: 980 50
- Area code: +421 47
- Vehicle registration plate (until 2022): RS
- Website: www.gemernet.sk/hubovo/

Hubovo (Hungarian: Hubó) is a village and municipality in the Rimavská Sobota District of the Banská Bystrica Region of southern Slovakia.

== Geography ==
The municipality lies at an altitude of 233 metres (764 ft) and covers an area of 11.08 km^{2} (4.28 sq mi) (2025).

== History ==
In historical records, the village was first mentioned in 1235 (1323 Hubouu, 1449 Hubow, Hwba). It belonged to Gemer County.

== Population ==
Population statistic (10 years)
| Year | 1995 | 2005 | 2015 | 2025 |
|---|---|---|---|---|
| Count | 165 | 142 | 135 | 111 |
| Difference | | −13.93% | −4.92% | −17.77% |

Population statistic
| Year | 2024 | 2025 |
|---|---|---|
| Count | 113 | 111 |
| Difference | | −1.76% |

It has a population of 111 people (31 December 2025).

=== Ethnicity ===
Census 2021 (1+ %)
| Ethnicity | Number | Fraction |
|---|---|---|
| Hungarian | 111 | 86.71% |
| Slovak | 27 | 21.09% |
| Romani | 10 | 7.81% |
| Total | 128 | |

In year 2021 was 128 people by ethnicity 111 as Hungarian, 27 as Slovak, 10 as Romani and 1 as Not found out.

Note on population: The difference values of population numbers in the table "Population statistic" and in the sections "Ethnicity" & "Religion" is caused by the use of various statistical methods.

=== Religion ===
Census 2021 (1+ %)
| Religion | Number | Fraction |
|---|---|---|
| Calvinist Church | 62 | 48.44% |
| None | 29 | 22.66% |
| Roman Catholic Church | 22 | 17.19% |
| Greek Catholic Church | 7 | 5.47% |
| Evangelical Church | 7 | 5.47% |
| Total | 128 | |

In year 2021 was 128 people by religion 62 from Calvinist Church, 29 from None, 22 from Roman Catholic Church, 7 from Greek Catholic Church, 7 from Evangelical Church and 1 from Not found out.

== Genealogical resources ==
The records for genealogical research are available at the state archive "Statny Archiv in Banska Bystrica, Slovakia"

- Roman Catholic church records (births/marriages/deaths): 1769-1896 (parish B)
- Lutheran church records (births/marriages/deaths): 1730-1895 (parish B)
- Reformated church records (births/marriages/deaths): 1770-1911 (parish A)

== See also ==
- List of municipalities and towns in Slovakia
