= Thomas (bishop of Várad) =

Hungarian prelate

- Bishop-elect of Várad
- Installed: 1279
- Term ended: 1282
- Predecessor: Lodomer
- Successor: Bartholomew
- Other post: Provost of Vasvár

Personal details
- Died: 1282/1283
- Denomination: Roman Catholic

Thomas (Hungarian: Tamás; died 1282 or 1283) was a Hungarian prelate in the second half of the 13th century, who served as Bishop-elect of Várad (present-day Oradea, Romania) from 1279 to 1282.

== Career ==
The origin and early life of Thomas are unknown. Succeeding the foreign cleric Bonaventura, Thomas functioned as provost of the collegiate chapter of Vasvár between 1272 and 1279. He was elected as Bishop of Várad in the second half of 1279, since the provostship of Vasvár was vacant at that time. Thomas is first styled as bishop-elect in July 1280 by contemporary records.

Despite the unanimous request of the cathedral chapter of Várad, papal legate Philip of Fermo refused to confirm Thomas' election. Philip objected that Thomas was not ordained to the priesthood within one year of his election as provost, despite the decrees of the Second Council of Lyon. The chapter of Várad appealed to the Roman Curia thereafter, citing that the decree was applied only to the provosts dealing with pastoral care, while Vasvár was a collegiate chapter. Pope Martin IV accepted the argument and authorized the metropolitan John Hont-Pázmány, Archbishop of Kalocsa and his two suffragans – Pouka of Syrmia and Gregory of Csanád – on 18 June 1282 to confirm Thomas' election.

Thomas was referred to as a deceased person in August 1283. He left his family a considerable fortune at his death, who, however, soon began to litigate with each other for the estates and servants. He was succeeded by Bartholomew in 1284.

== Sources ==
- Bunyitay, Vince (1881). "Két feledésbe ment váradi püspök [Two Forgotten Bishops of Várad]". Századok (in Hungarian). 15 (4). Magyar Történelmi Társulat: 332–335. ISSN 0039-8098.
- Kovács, Viktória (2019). "Alter ego domini papae Nicolai III. Fülöp fermói püspök, szentszéki legátus magyarországi tevékenysége (1279–1281) [Alter ego domini papae Nicolai III. The Activity of Philip, Bishop of Fermo and Legate of the Holy See in Hungary (1279–1281)]". In Kiss, Gergely (ed.). Varietas delectat. A pápai–magyar kapcsolatok sokszínűsége a 11–14. században (in Hungarian). Pécsi Tudományegyetem BTK TTI Középkori és Koraújkori Történeti Tanszék. pp. 117–166. ISBN 978-963-429-394-1.
- Thoroczkay, Gábor (2020). "Prépostság a nyugati határszélen: a vasvári társaskáptalan története a kezdetektől a 14. század közepéig [Provostship on the Western Border: the History of the Collegiate Chapter of Vasvár from the Beginning to the Middle of the 14th Century]". Fons (in Hungarian). 27 (2). Szentpétery Imre Történettudományi Alapítvány: 157–171. ISSN 1217-8020.
- Zsoldos, Attila (2011). Magyarország világi archontológiája, 1000–1301 [Secular Archontology of Hungary, 1000–1301] (in Hungarian). História, MTA Történettudományi Intézete. ISBN 978-963-9627-38-3.

Catholic Church titles
Preceded by Bonaventura	Provost of Vasvár; 1272–1279	Succeeded by Michael
Preceded by Lodomer	Bishop of Várad (elected); 1279–1282	Succeeded by Bartholomew
