= Acho (vice-chancellor) =

13th-century Hungarian clergyman

Acho (died after 1281) was a Hungarian clergyman in the 13th century, who served as vice-chancellor of the royal court from 1279 to 1280 and in 1281.

== Career ==
Acho (also Ach or Écs) was appointed vice-chancellor in December 1279, succeeding the controversial prelate Nicholas Kán. His term coincides with the harsh dispute between King Ladislaus IV and the papal legate Philip III, Bishop of Fermo. Acho is the only known vice-chancellor in the 13th century, who did not hold any ecclesiastical benefice simultaneously with his service. Historian Dániel Bácsatyai considered Acho of low-born was a strong confidant of the monarch, and Philip successfully prevented him from obtaining benefice. Ladislaus' double seal from 1279 with the sigillum "A" reflects Acho's activity as vice-chancellor.

Following the temporary reconciliation of Ladislaus and Philip in the spring of 1280, Acho was replaced by Bartholomew, son of Bot in August 1280. Following the dismissal of Palatine Finta Aba and his subsequent insurgency in the spring of 1281, Acho was reinstated as vice-chancellor; he is first mentioned in this capacity in April 1281. He held the office at least until September 1281. He was succeeded by Bartholomew again, who is first styled as vice-chancellor in March 1282.

== Sources ==
- Bácsatyai, Dániel (2021). "A 13. századi uralkodói nagy- és kettőspecsétek kronológiája [Chronology of 13th-century royal grand and double seals in Hungary]". Turul (in Hungarian). 94 (1): 1–22. ISSN 1216-7258.
- Zsoldos, Attila (2011). Magyarország világi archontológiája, 1000–1301 [Secular Archontology of Hungary, 1000–1301] (in Hungarian). História, MTA Történettudományi Intézete. ISBN 978-963-9627-38-3.

Political offices
Preceded by Nicholas Kán	Vice-chancellor; 1279–1280	Succeeded by Bartholomew
Preceded by Bartholomew	Vice-chancellor; 1281	Succeeded by Bartholomew
