= Bás Mezőpilis =

Hungarian nobleman

Bás (II) Mezőpilis

Count of the Younger King's Court
- Reign: 1263–1264
- Predecessor: Nicholas Geregye
- Successor: Benedict Balog
- Died: after 1272
- Noble family: gens Mezőpilis
- Issue: Peter
- Father: Bás I

Bás (II) from the kindred Mezőpilis (Hungarian: Mezőpilis nembeli (II.) Bás; died after 1272) was a Hungarian lord in the 13th century. As a confidant of Duke Stephen, he held various positions in his court, but he later defected to King Béla IV of Hungary.

== Background ==
Bás (or Baas) was born into the gens (clan) Mezőpilis. The name of the kindred is mentioned only once by a single document in 1293, regarding Peter, the son of Bás (II), who is referred to as "Petrus filius Baas de genere Mezeupylis". It is plausible that Mezőpilis was a settlement that once existed. Bás (II) was the son of Bás (I). He also had a brother Urka, who was styled as steward of the royal estate of Liptó (the core of future Liptó County) and the king's tárnok (treasurer official) in 1269. Bás had a son Peter, from whom the Mikolai family descended, which became extinct in the 1370–1380s.

== Career ==
Bás possessed landholdings and villages along the river Garam (Hron) in Esztergom, Bars and Hont counties in Upper Hungary (present-day Slovakia). For his service and loyalty, Bás was granted the estate Mikola (later Garammikola, present-day a borough of Želiezovce, Slovakia) by Béla IV in 1247. The estate later became the centre of the Mezőpilis clan's landholdings in the region. Prior to 1251, the king also donated the estate Szobotist in Nyitra County (today Sobotište, Slovakia) to him. Bás served as ispán of Trencsén County at least from 1251 to 1259. He built the fort of Ugróc (present-day ruins near Uhrovec, Slovakia). With the permission of the king, Bás sold the estate Szobotist "due to lack of money" to Aba the Great from the clan of the same name for 40 silver marks in 1251. As ispán, Bás acted as royal commissioner to determine the borders of donated lands throughout Trencsén County in the 1250s, for instance in 1252, 1255 and 1256.

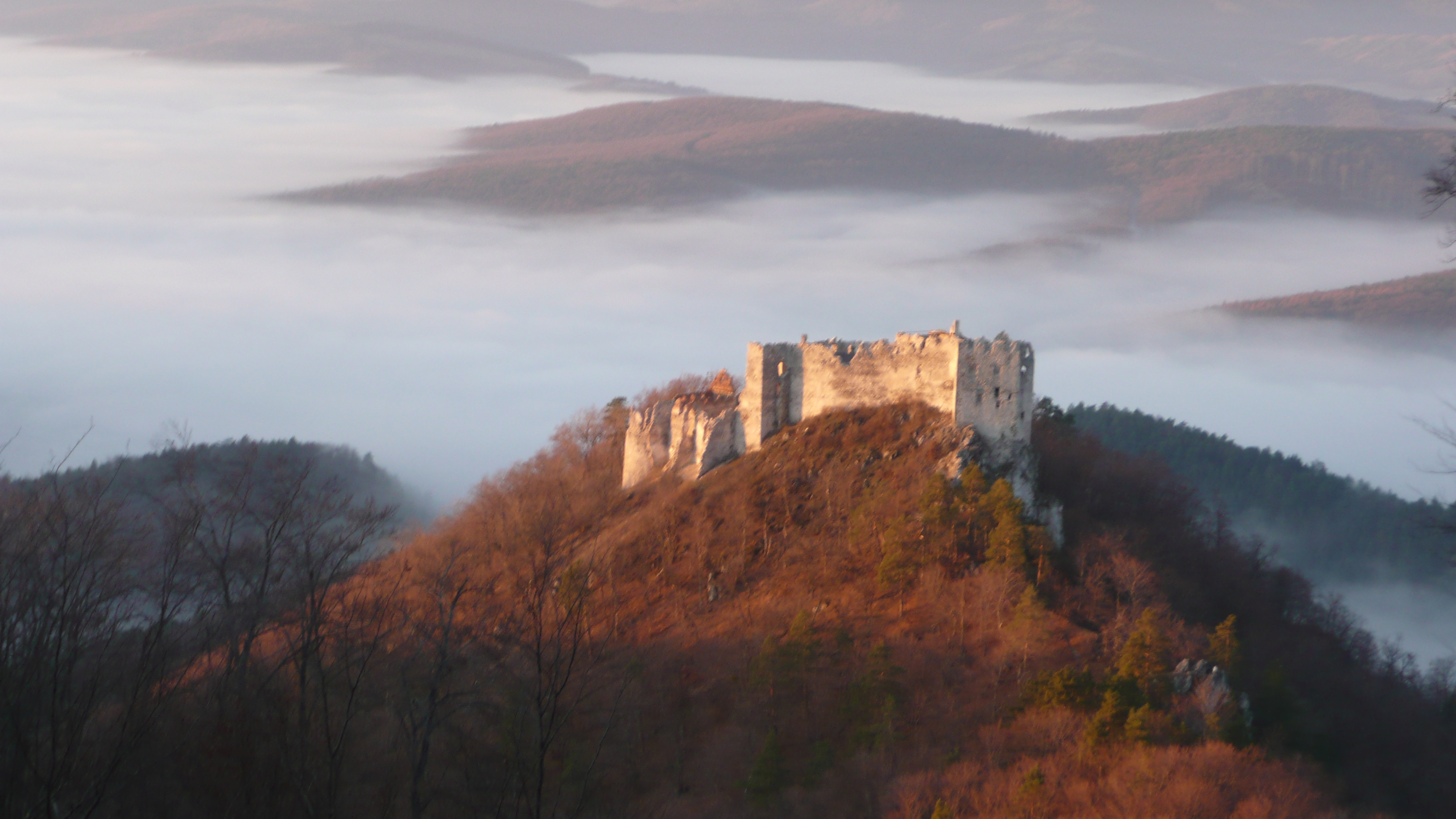
The castle of Uhrovec (Ugróc) in Slovakia, built by Bás Mezőpilis in the 1250s

Bás entered the service of Duke Stephen, the king's eldest son and heir by the year 1259, when he was styled as treasurer of the ducal court in Styria. He held the office until 1260 at the latest. Still in 1259, Bás was replaced as ispán of Trencsén County. In March 1260, Béla IV confirmed Bás' right of ownership over two portions in Orlóc in Trencsén County, which he had previously purchased from local converted Jew called Pouka. Soon, the relationship between Béla IV and his son Stephen had gradually deteriorated. Bás remained in the service of Stephen, who adopted the title of younger king (rex iunior) following a brief skirmish with his father in 1262. Bás remained loyal to Stephen, for which his possessions were confiscated in Orlóc. Bás was installed as count (head) of the younger king's court in the first half of 1263, which was the second most prestigious position in Stephen's realm. According to a non-authentic charter, he held the dignity already in late 1262. Beside that, he also administered Gömör County. In this capacity, he took part in the joint commissions, the members of which were delegated by the two monarchs to settle controversial cases regarding property relations. Bás is last mentioned in both positions in late November 1264, when judged over a lawsuit between members of the gens Balogsemjén over the estate Panyola in Szatmár County.

Just prior to the outbreak of the large-scale civil war between Béla and Stephen, Bás defected to the court of the senior king. According to historian Mór Wertner, he acted as co-judge in the court of Queen Maria Laskarina in May 1265. In contrast, historian Attila Zsoldos argued that Bás switched to Béla's party only in 1267, when the tension re-emerged between father and son. Bás was installed as ispán of Dubica County by the year 1268, which territory belonged to the domain of King Béla's younger and favorite son Béla, Duke of Slavonia. Béla donated the land Benőc to Bás, which he had previously confiscated from Merse, son of Benedict (ancestor of the prestigious Szinyei Merse family). Following the death of Béla IV in 1270, Stephen V ascended the Hungarian throne. The monarch forgave Bás for his earlier betrayal, but he could no longer get an important position in the royal court, and Stephen returned the estate Benőc to Merse. He served as ispán of Szolgagyőr (Galgóc) royal castle (ispánate) within Nyitra County from 1270 to 1272. Bás and vice-chancellor Benedict were sent as envoys to the court of Ottokar II of Bohemia in the summer of 1270, in order to prepare the personal meeting of the two monarchs. The truce concluded as a result of their negotiations in Brno. They informed Philip of Spanheim, Stephen's ally, on the truce on 2 July 1270. Bás died sometime after 1272.

== Sources ==
- Bácsatyai, Dániel (2019). "Kik voltak a tárnokok? [Who Were the Tárnoks?]". In Kádas, István; Skorka, Renáta; Weisz, Boglárka (eds.). Márvány, tárház, adomány. Gazdaságtörténeti tanulmányok a magyar középkorról (in Hungarian). MTA Bölcsészettudományi Kutatóközpont. pp. 13–49. ISBN 978-963-416-179-0.
- Wertner, Mór (1897). "Garam-Mikolai Bás országbíró [Judge royal Bás of Garam-Mikola]". Századok (in Hungarian). 31 (1). Magyar Történelmi Társulat: 39–43. ISSN 0039-8098.
- Zsoldos, Attila (2007). Családi ügy: IV. Béla és István ifjabb király viszálya az 1260-as években [A family affair: The Conflict between Béla IV and Junior King Stephen in the 1260s] (in Hungarian). História, MTA Történettudományi Intézete. ISBN 978-963-9627-15-4.
- Zsoldos, Attila (2011). Magyarország világi archontológiája, 1000–1301 [Secular Archontology of Hungary, 1000–1301] (in Hungarian). História, MTA Történettudományi Intézete. ISBN 978-963-9627-38-3.

Bás II Genus Mezőpilis Born: ? Died: after 1272
Political offices
Preceded by Nicholas Geregye	Count of the Younger King's Court; 1263–1264	Succeeded by Benedict Balog
