= Gömör County =

County of the Kingdom of Hungary

Coordinates: 48°27′08″N 20°19′14″E

Gömör (Slovak: Gemer, Hungarian: Gömör, German: Gemer or Gömör, Latin: Gömörinum) was an administrative county (comitatus) of the Kingdom of Hungary. In the 19th century, and in the beginning of the 20th century, it was united with the Kis-Hont County to form Gömör-Kishont County. Its territory is located in southern Slovakia and northern Hungary. Today names Gömör/Gemer are only an informal designation of the corresponding territory without administrative role.

== Geography ==
Gemer region is situated in Slovenské rudohorie approximately between the present-day Slovak-Hungarian border, the towns Poltár and Rožňava and the Low Tatras (Nízke Tatry). It borders traditional regions Spiš to the North, Abov to the East, Borsod to the South, Heves to the South-West, Novohrad to the west, and Zvolen and Liptov regions at North-West.

The river Slaná (Sajó) flows through Gemer from North to the South.

Gömör és Kishont County was covering area of 4,289 km^{2} in 1910.

== Capitals ==
The capital of Gömör region was originally Gömör Castle, after which it was named, and from the early 18th century Pelsőc (Plešivec) town. After merging with Kis-Hont region, Rimaszombat (Rimavská Sobota) became new centre of region. Cultural centres of region include Rožňava, Rimavská Sobota and Revúca.

== History ==
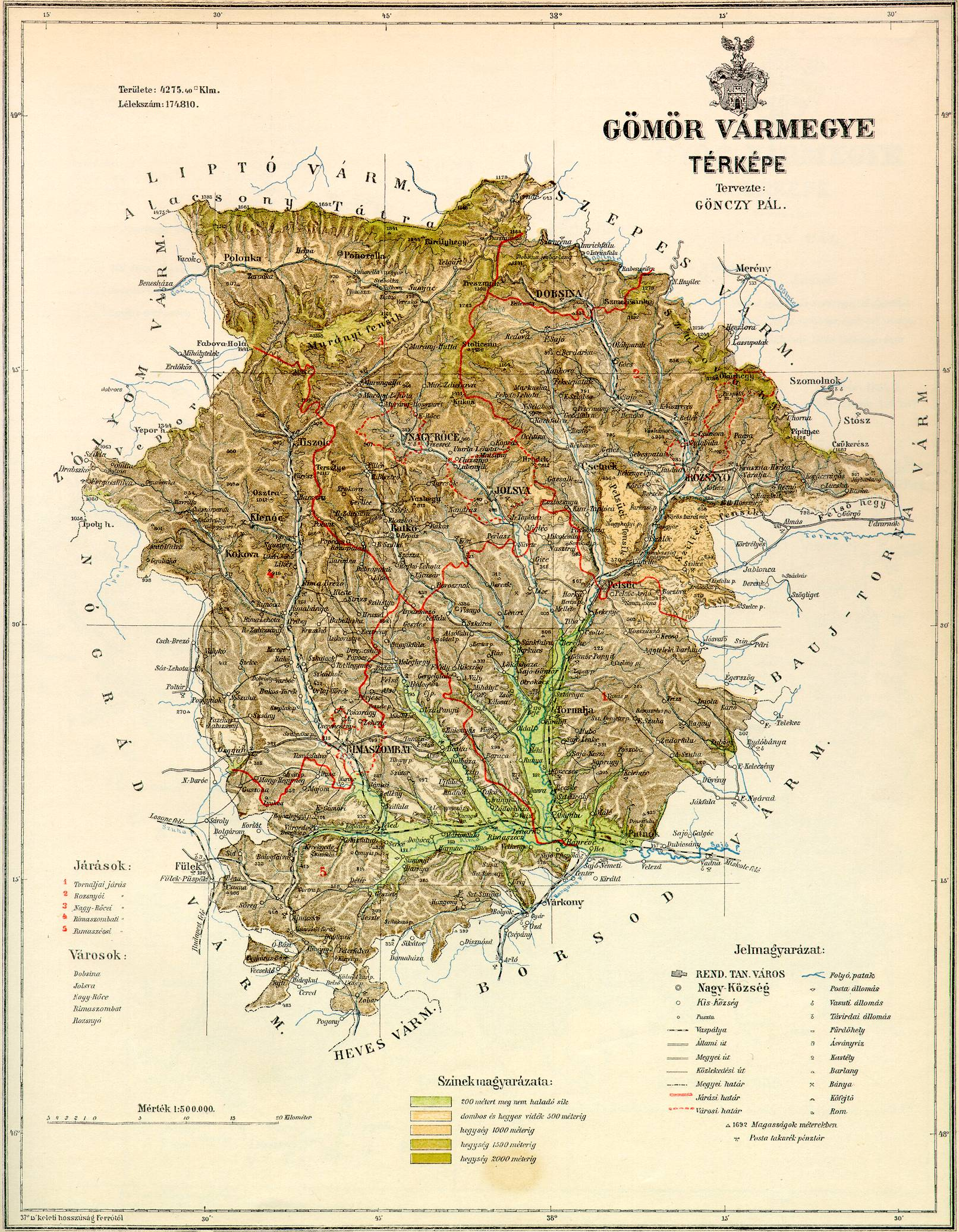
Former Gömör-Kishont county in Kingdom of Hungary, established in 1802

Gömör is one of the oldest counties of the Kingdom of Hungary, and it was already mentioned in the 11th century. The territory approximately between the towns Tiszolc and Rimaszombat, called Kis-Hont was merged with Gemer from 1786 until 1790, and again in 1802. After that, it was called Gömör-Kishont. Southern parts of region were occupied and ruled by Ottomans between 1553 and 1686 as part of Sandjak of Novigrad) and Sandjak of Holok) in Budin Eyalet and Uyvar eyalet.

History of Gömör is connected with several noble families, including Ákos family, Bebek family, Csetneki family, Mariássy family, Koháry family, Coburg family and the Andrássy family.

Gömör played also important part in Slovak National Revival, as many Slovak intellectuals were born or living in the region. The first Slovak high school teaching in Slovak was opened in Nagyrőce in 1862.

In 1920, by the Treaty of Trianon most of the county became part of newly formed Czechoslovakia, except 7.5% of its area around Putnok, which became temporarily part of the Hungarian county of Borsod-Gömör-Kishont.

After First Vienna Award in 1938, most of region became part of Hungary and the Gömör-Kishont County was recreated. This situation lasted until the end of the war, when First Vienna Award was reverted and 92.5% of the area became part of Czechoslovakia again.

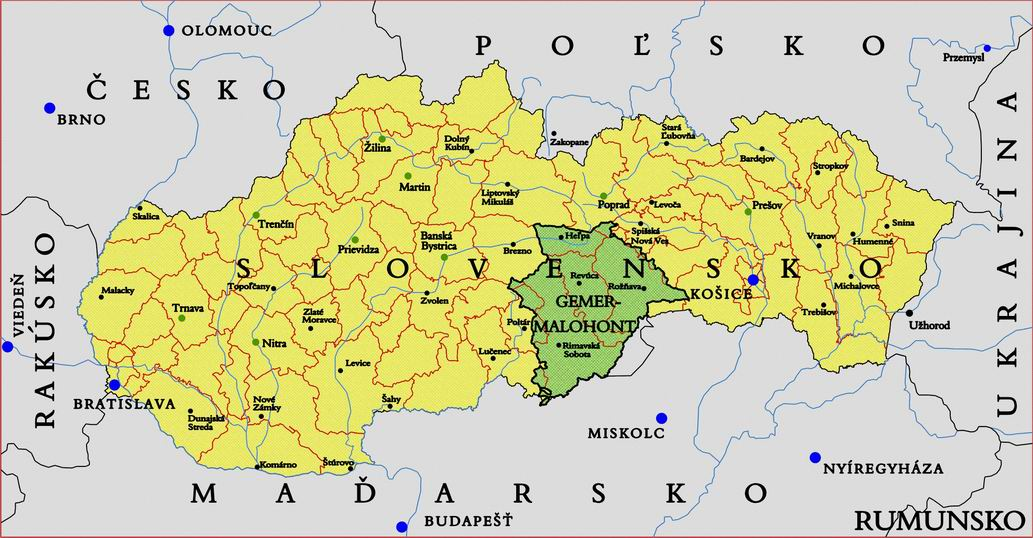
Former Gemer-Malohont region within Slovakia

Nowadays, the Slovak part of Gemer and Malohont is situated in two Slovak administrative regions: Banská Bystrica Region and Košice Region. Hungarian part of former Gömör County is situated in Borsod-Abaúj-Zemplén County. In Hungary the name of Gömör is now preserved only in the name of a small village, Gömörszőlős, the Gömör Museum in Putnok, and in that of Gömöri station, the smaller railway station of Miskolc. In Slovakia it is still being commonly used, but only as informal name of the region without administrative independence. However, it is one of Slovak Regions of tourism, as Gemerský región cestovného ruchu (Gemer Tourist Region).

== Economy ==
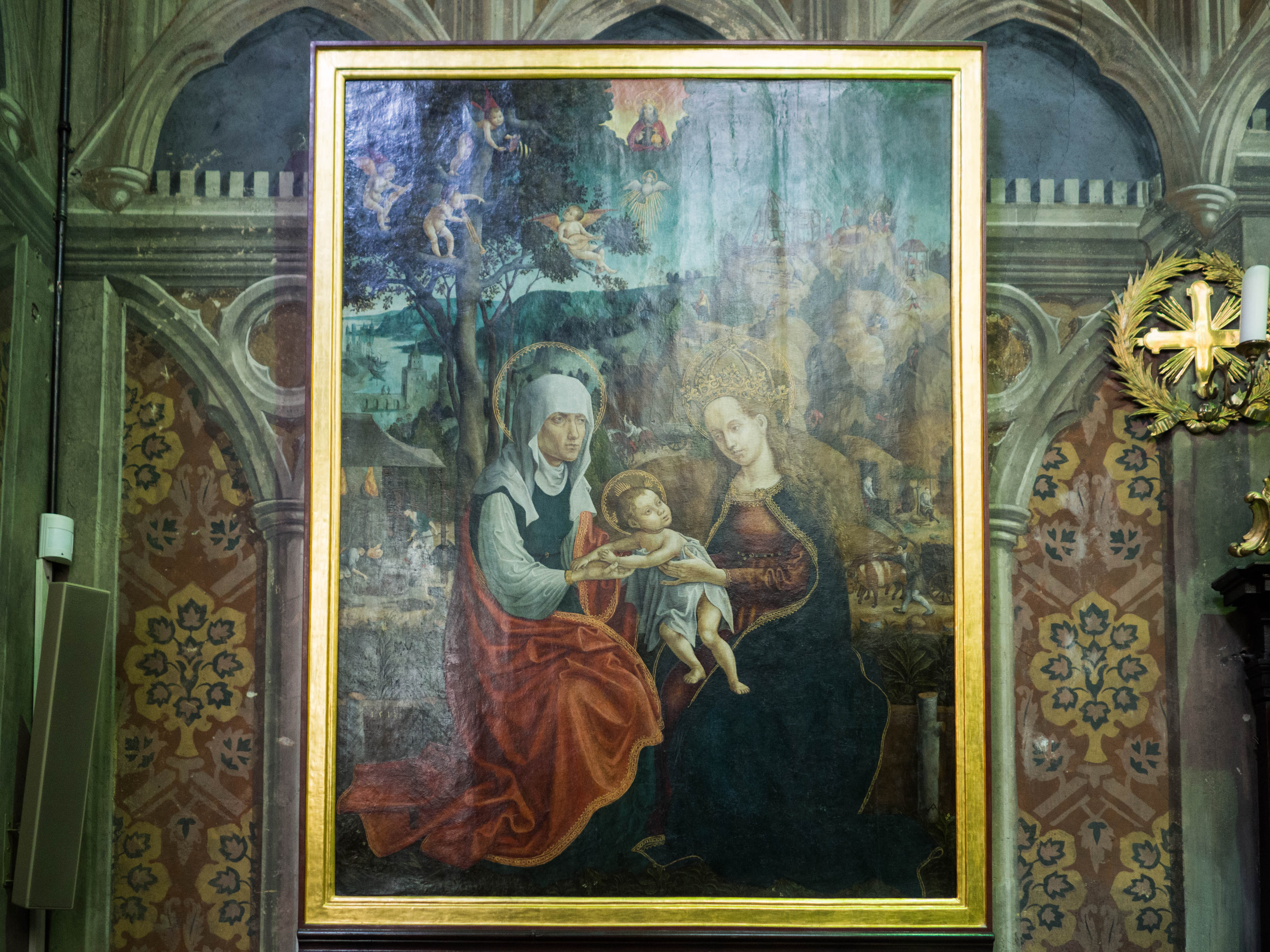
Medieval painting mettercia from cathedral in Rožňava, which shows process of mining and processing of iron ore in background.

Historically, Gömör and Kis-Hont was very rich because of its rich mineral and ore deposits. Mining took place here yet in the Neolithic. Various minerals were mined here, including iron ores, copper or gold. Evidence of the region's past wealth is the number of mansions and palaces, and many preserved medieval churches with quality frescoes.

Thanks to the wealth from mines, most villages in Gömör could already in Middle Ages afford to have their own stone church. In 14th Century many of them were decorated with frescoes by Italian masters and by their local disciples.

Big credit on development of mining in Gömör in Late modern period had noble family Andrássy, notably count Manó Andrássy, who had built several ore mills, thanks to what he was called "Iron Count". Gradually most of the mines and plants in the region were taken over by Rimamurány-Salgótarjáni Vasmű Részvénytársaság (Rimamurán-Salgotarján Ironworks Company). In that time, there was a massive development, mining colonies with quality housing for miners and administrative workers were built, and miners, despite hard work, had cultural and technological advantages that most of inhabitants did not yet have at the time.

However, in 20th century glory and wealth of the region gradually declined. This had several reasons. Ore deposits gradually emptied, and used technologies became obsolete. After the Treaty of Trianon, region which used to be near centre of country became periphery. In addition, mining companies, which had been already declining before the disintegration of Hungarian Kingdom suddenly gained new rivals from Bohemia.

Another decline followed the fall of socialism and privatizations in 1990s. Mining still continues at some locations, but only in limited extent.

Modern employers in the region include Slovenské Magnezitové Závody Jelšava and SLOVMAG Lubeník, which mine magnetite, paper mills SHP Slavošovce and producer of mineral water Gemerka.

Nowadays, Gemer region is one of the poorest regions of Slovakia. Many young people leaves it for other regions of Slovakia or go to foreign countries.

== Demographics ==
Historically, Gömör is associated with three ethnic groups: Hungarians, Germans and Slovaks. After the emergence of the Kingdom of Hungary, Gömör became multi-ethnical. As part of settlement policies, many settlers from Germany came to work in mines in the Middle Ages. The names of some villages still refer to German colonization, i.e. Ochtiná (from bavarian ocht – eight). The number of Germans in the region decreased after the war and after the expulsion of Germans from Czechoslovakia. Nowadays, Gemer is populated primarily by Slovaks (mainly Upper Gemer) and by Hungarians (notably Lower Gemer) and by Romani people.

== Religion ==
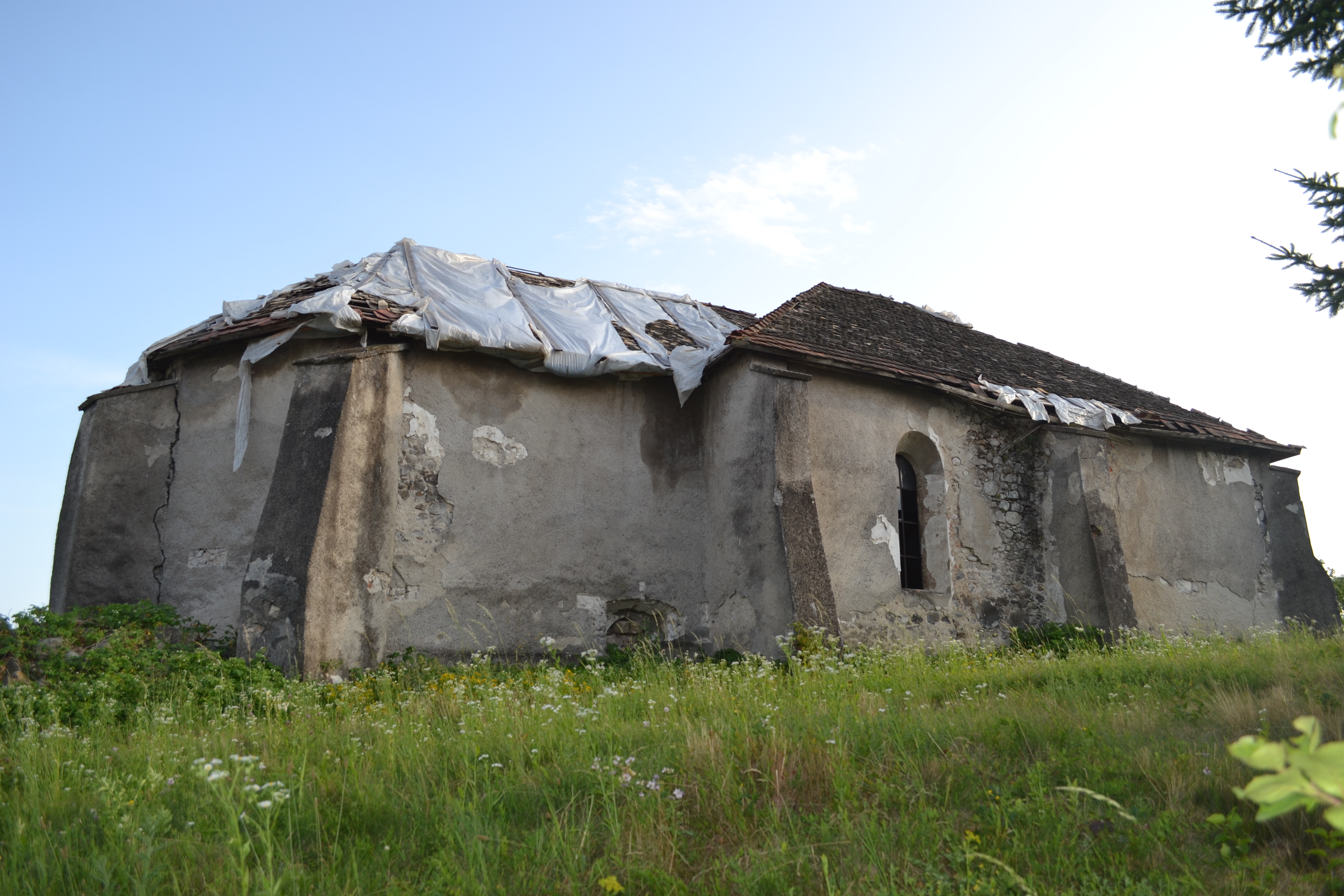
Neglected gothic church in Zacharovce. Parishes are poor, and they often do not have money for the necessary repairs.

Most of villages and towns have Lutheran churches. It's a relic of German colonisation, as German inhabitants brought Lutheranism to Gemer from German schools. On the south, notably amongst Hungarian population prevails Calvinism of Reformed Christian Church. However, in some villages, Roman Catholic faith remained. It is common in Gemer, that many villages and towns have several churches of different denominations.

In recent years, the number of active believers has decreased significantly. Many parishes had been united and are being served by a single pastor. There are no longer regular masses in many churches in region.

== Tourism ==
Despite its current poverty, because of its former wealth, Gömör has an interesting history, many historical monuments and authentic wild nature. In recent years, its popularity among tourists has been increasing, despite the lack of infrastructure.

Historical monuments in region include many medieval churches with Gothic frescoes, including the biggest rotunda in Central Europe in Süvete. Since most of the Gömör churches were in early modern period taken by Lutherans, who used to paint frescoes over by whitewash, much more frescoes was preserved in Gömör, than in other regions of Slovakia and of the entire former Kingdom of Hungary, at all. Gothic churches in Gemer are nowadays part of Gothic Route (Gotická Cesta), project of touristic route connecting the most valuable medieval churches. In 2020, most valuable frescoes in 12 medieval churches in Gemer had been nominated for European Heritage Label.

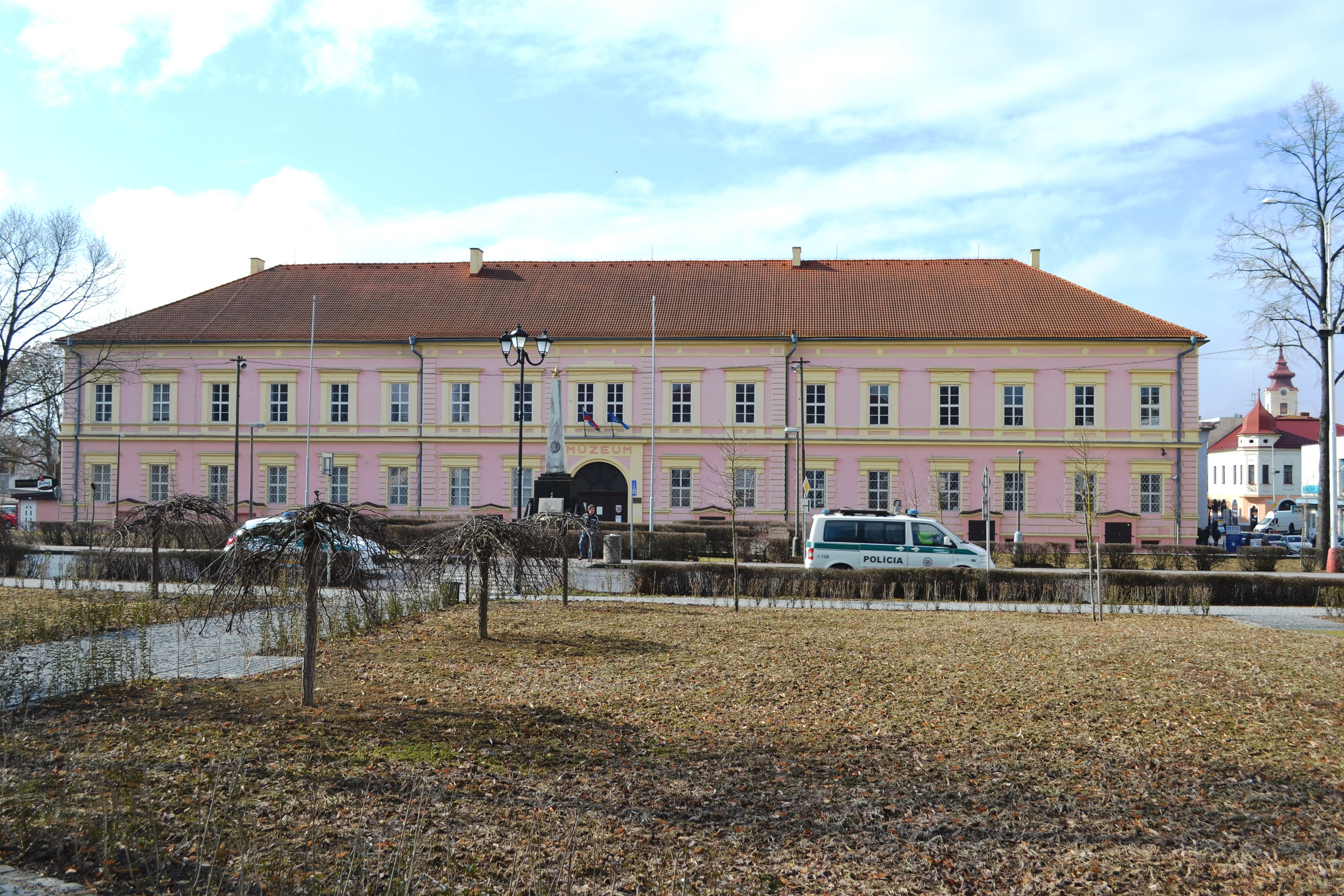
Gemer-Malohont Museum in Rimavská Sobota, one of oldest museums in Slovakia, dedicated to the history of Gemer-Malohont region

Probably the most popular historical monument in Gömör is the chateau in Betlér, monumental manor house of the Andrássy family. Today it is part of the Slovak National Museum. It is the only chateau in Slovakia with fully preserved original furniture and equipment. Other sights include the Krásna Hôrka Castle (closed due to reconstruction), Andrássy family mausoleum near Krásnohorské Podhradie and Muráň Castle, which is the third highest placed castle in Slovakia, known from many legends.

Many tourists visit Gemer because of its caves. There are more than a thousand caves, which are part of UNESCO World Heritage as Caves of Aggtelek Karst and Slovak Karst. They may be visited in both Slovakia and Hungary.

In recent times, more and more people visit Gemer because of its technical monuments. These include iron-mills in Nižná Slaná (Huta Etelka) and in Vlachovo (Huta Karol), a never finished system of freely accessible railway tunnels and bridge in Slavošovce and in Manezitovce known as Gemerské spojky.

There are many museums as well, the Mining Museum in Rožňava, Gemersko-Malohontské múzeum (Gemer-Malohont Museum) in Rimavská Sobota, Gömöri Múzeum in Putnok and Mining Expositions in Rákoš and in Nižná Slaná.

Natural attractions of Gemer are National Park Muránska Planina, national protected reservation Zádielská tiesňava, known for its valley. Hikers visit Volovec-Skalisko hill above Betliar. A tourist destination, especially in spring, is the village Brdárka known for its cherry orchards and Baroque church.

Another tourist destination is Dobinšký kopec (Dobšiná Hill), which has views of Dobšiná town and is used for hillclimbing races.

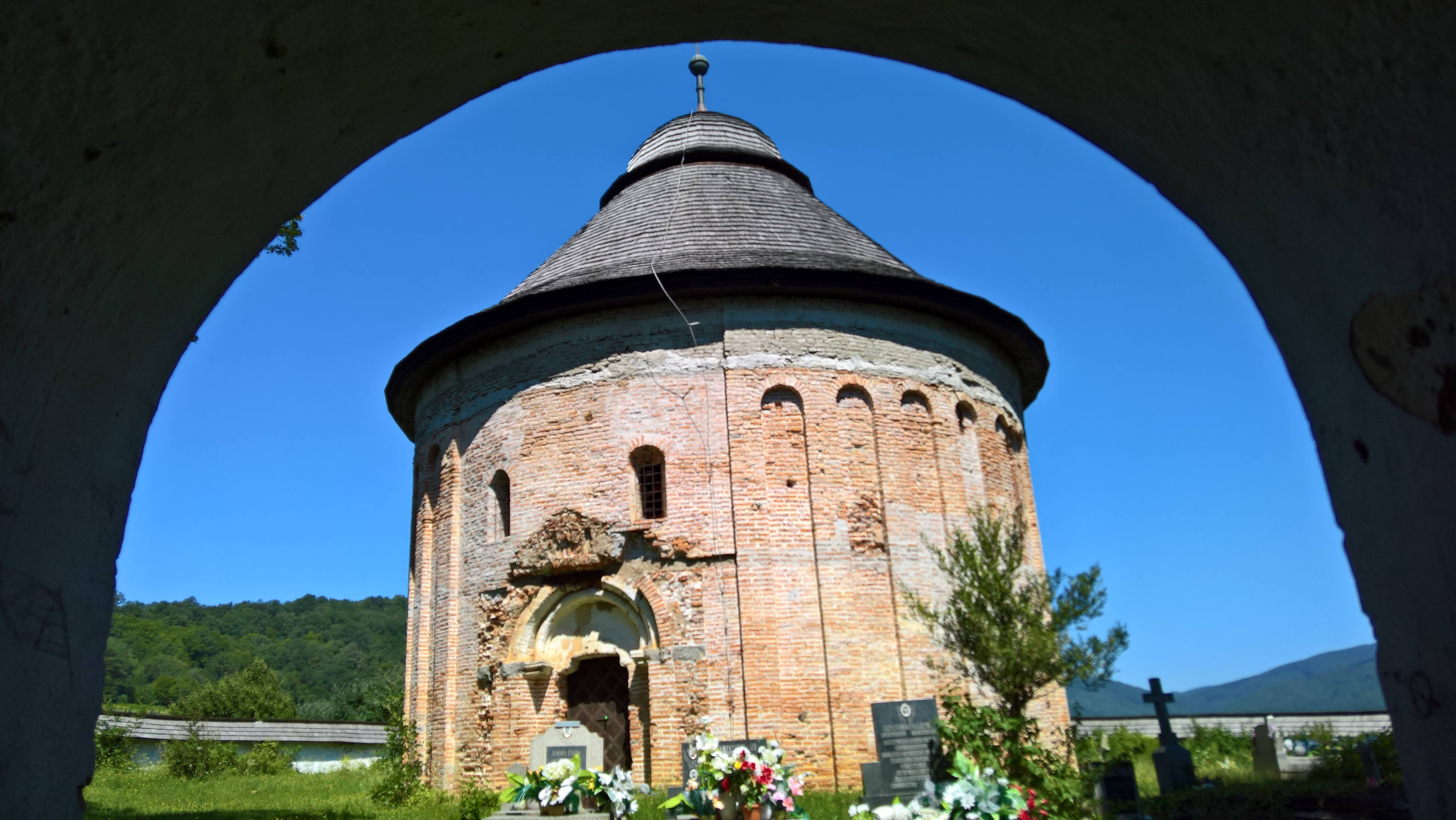
Romanesque rotunda in Šivetice, biggest rotunda of Central Europe

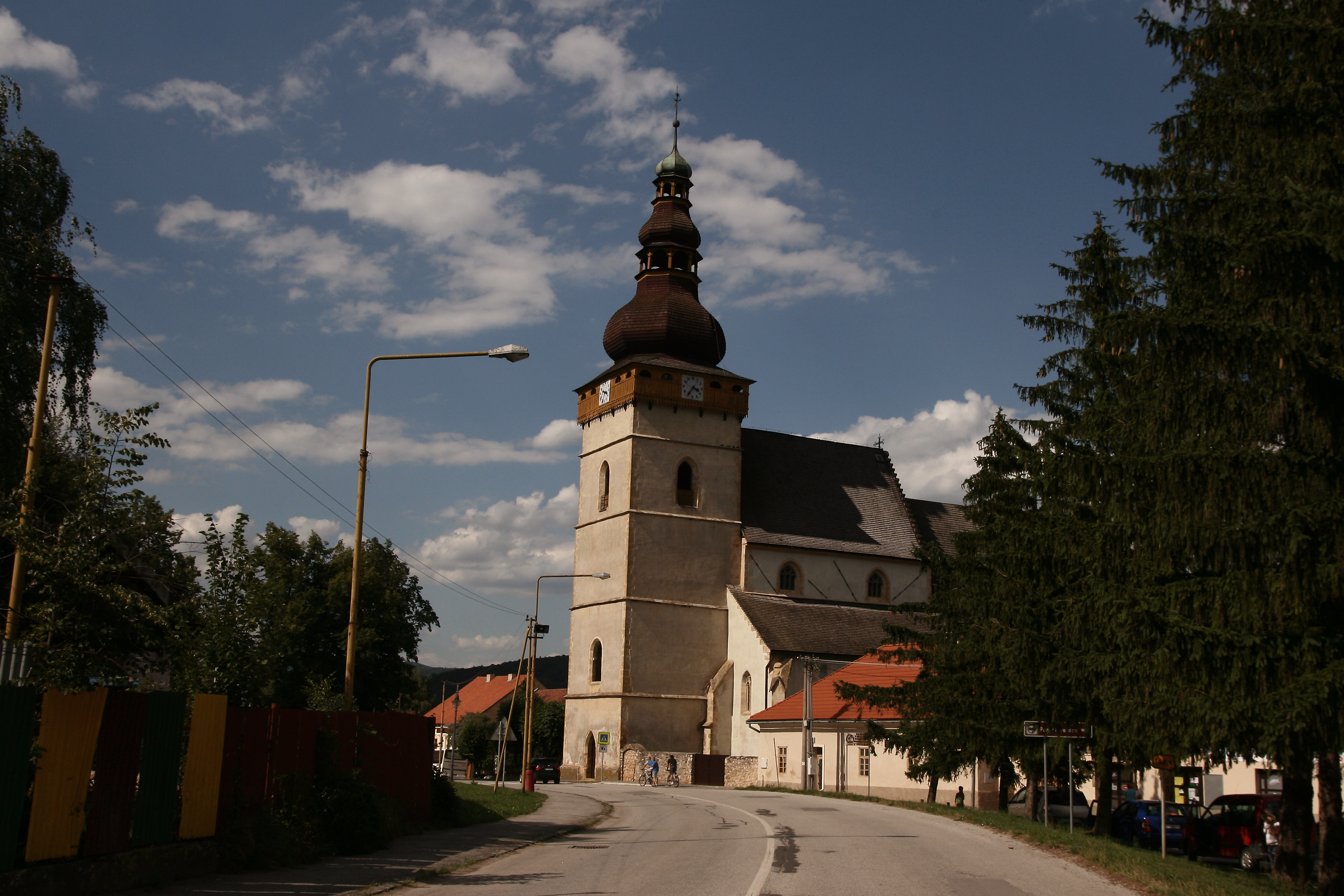
Lutheran gothic basilica in Štítnik from 14th century

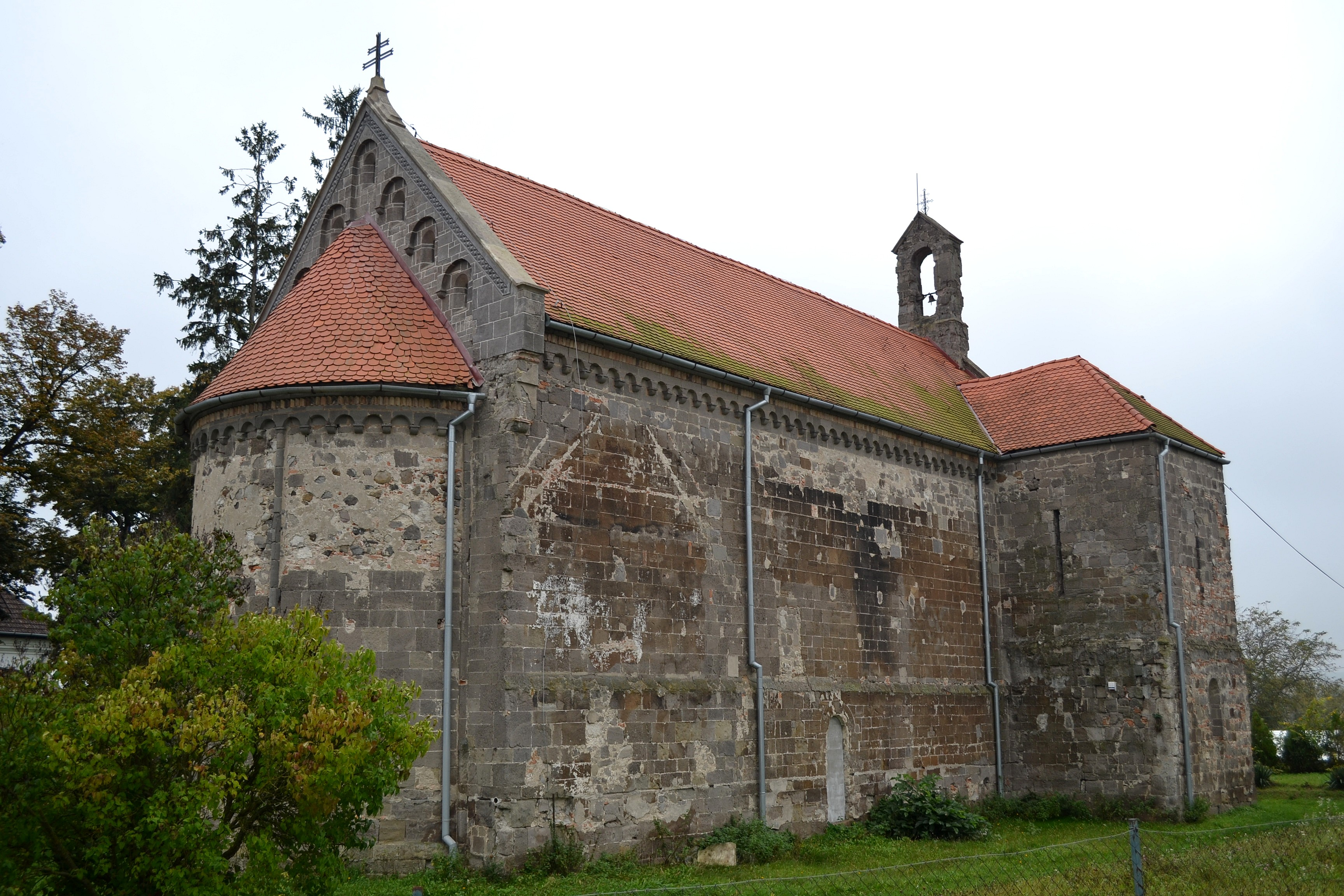
Romanesque church in Rimavské Janovce

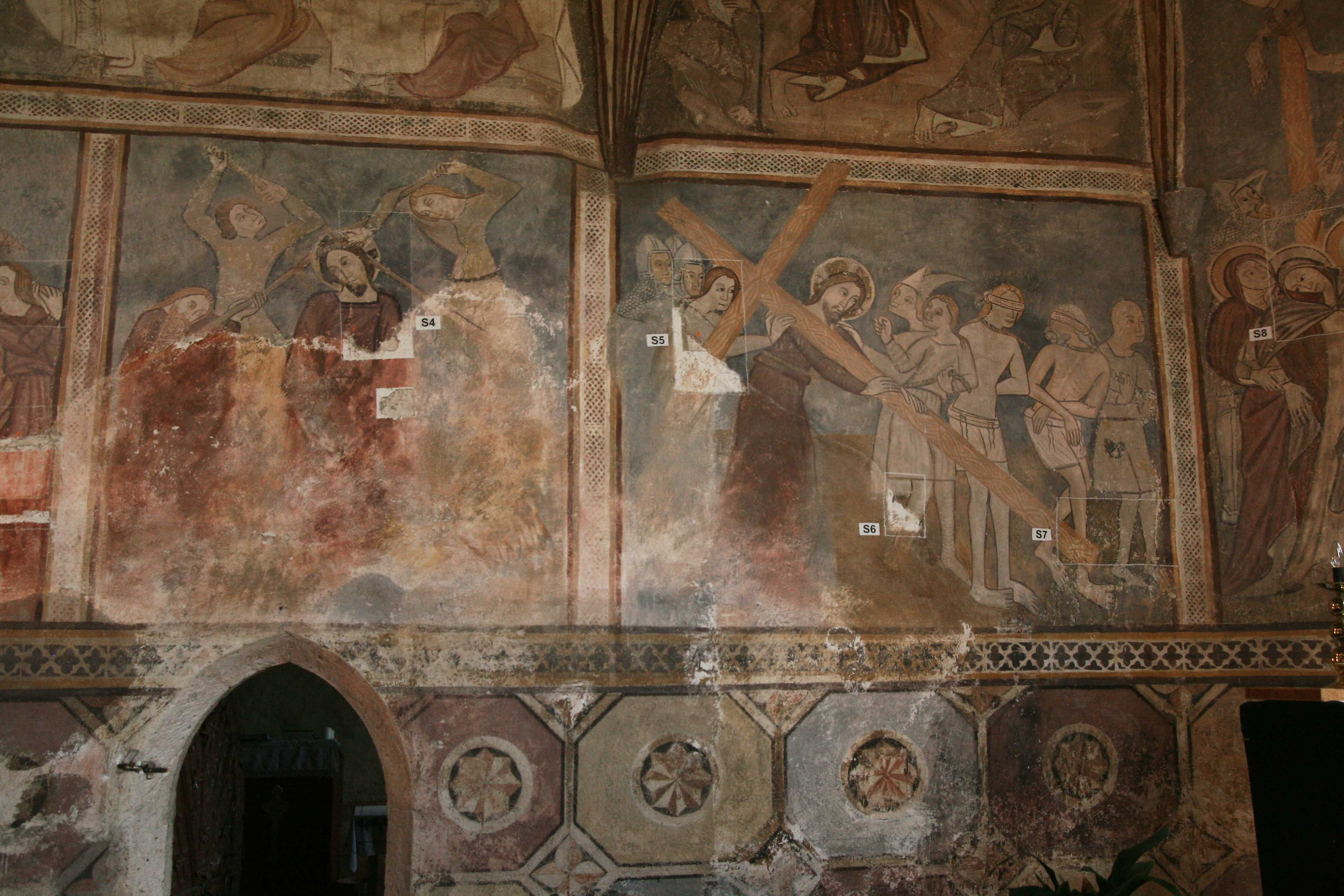
Medieval frescoes from 14th century in gothic church in Koceľovce

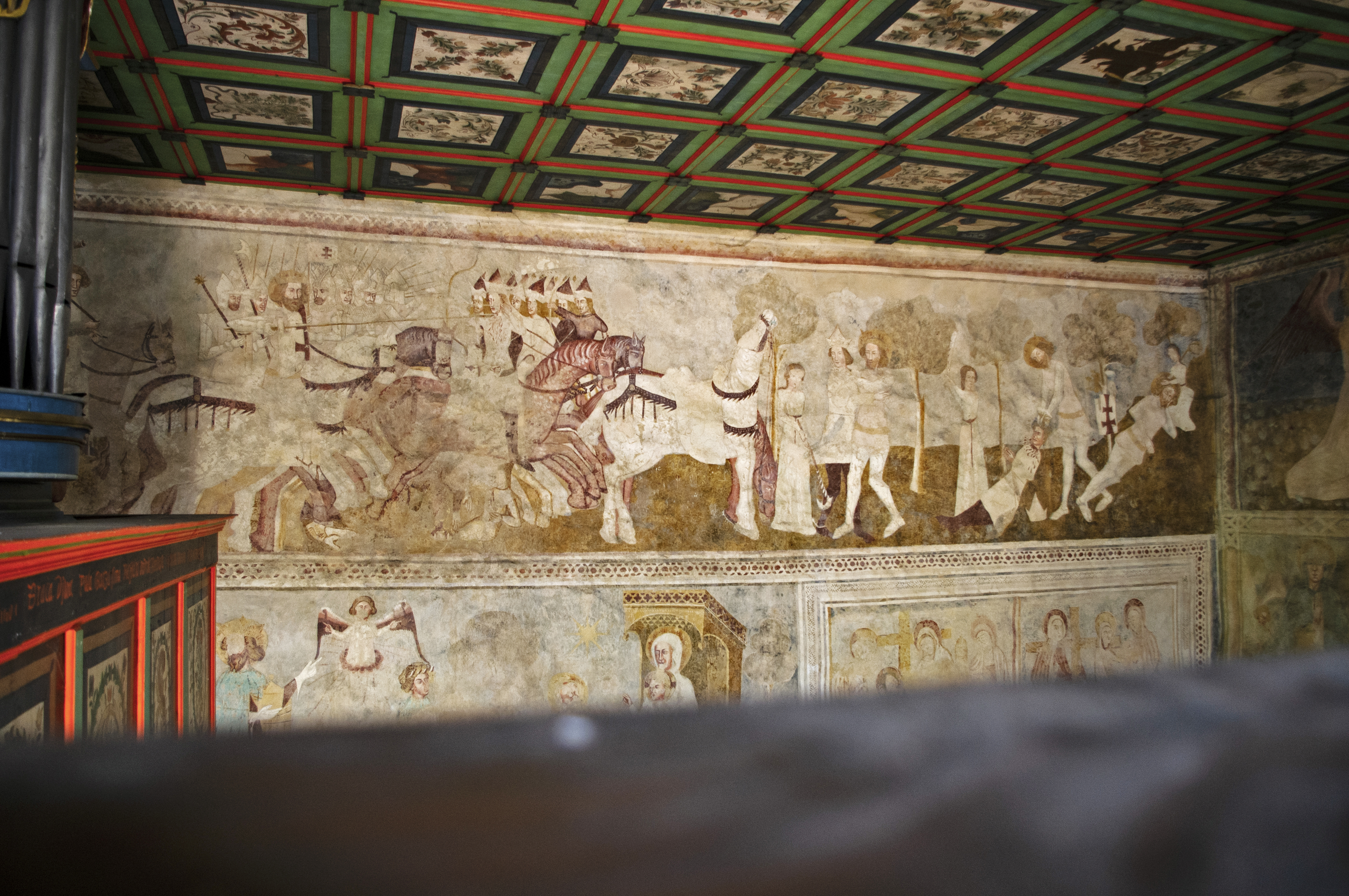
Gothic Fresco of legend of St. Ladislaus in church in Kraskovo

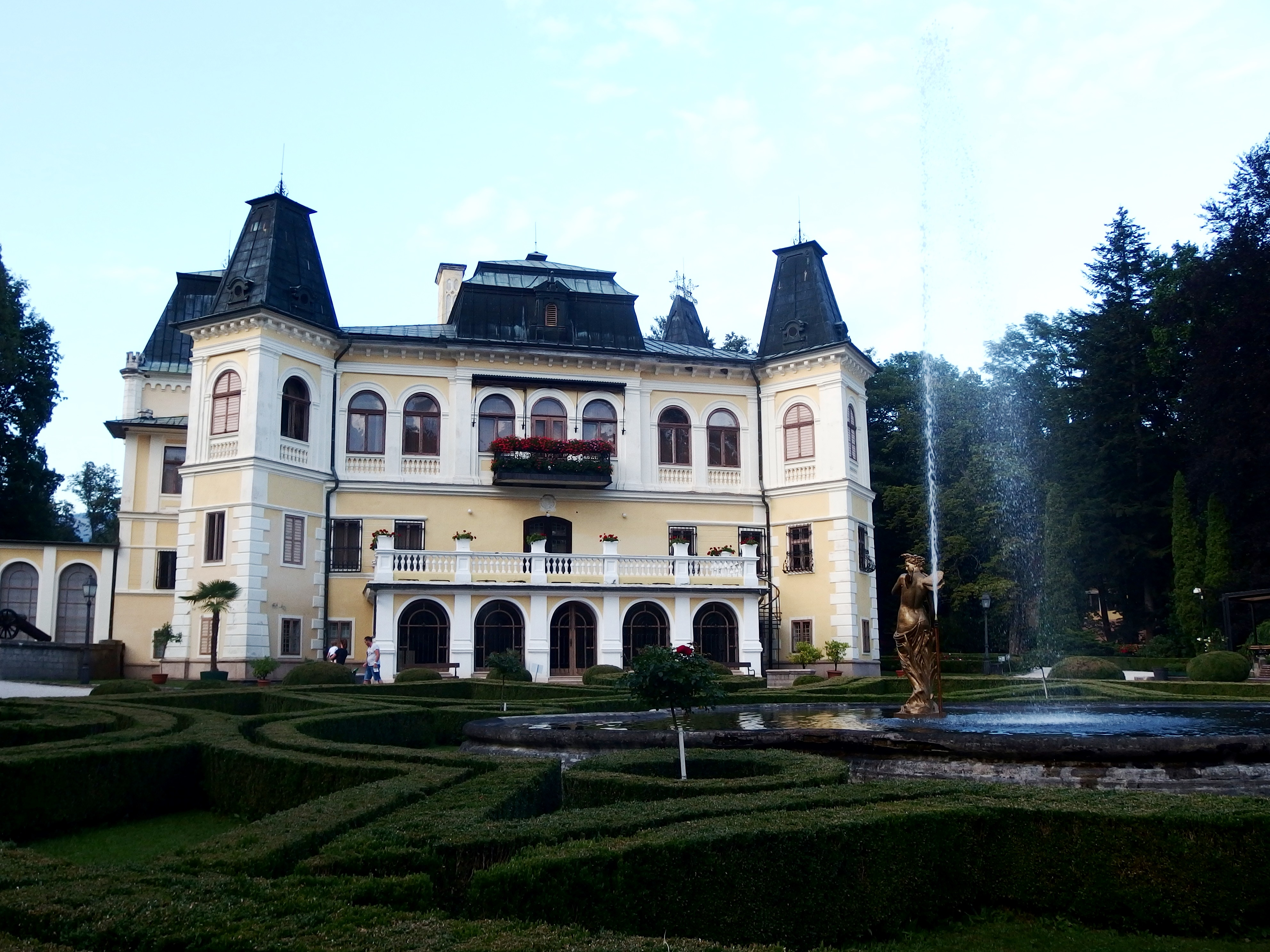
Chateau of Andrássy family in Betliar

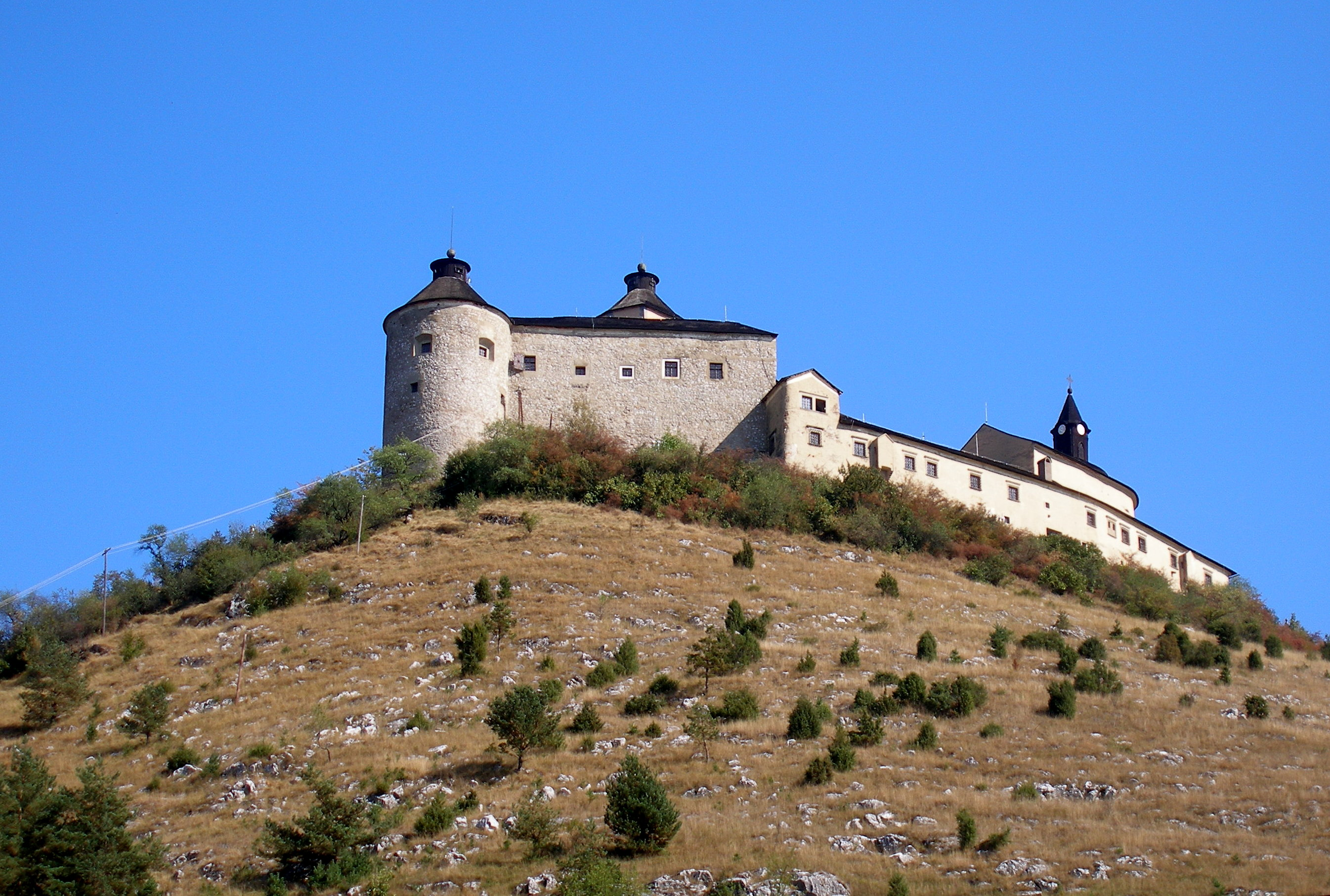
Castle Krásna Hôrka

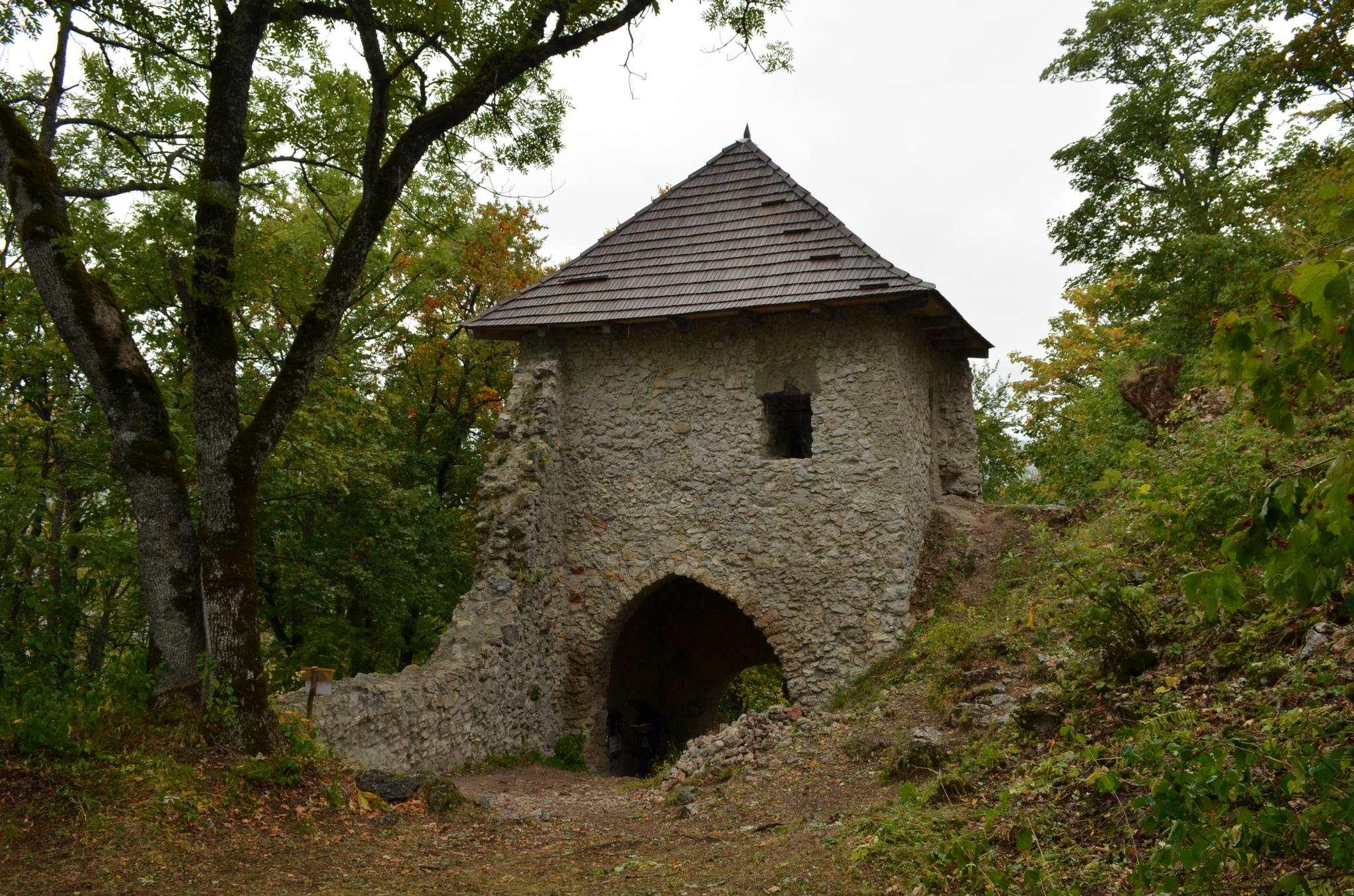
Muráň Castle

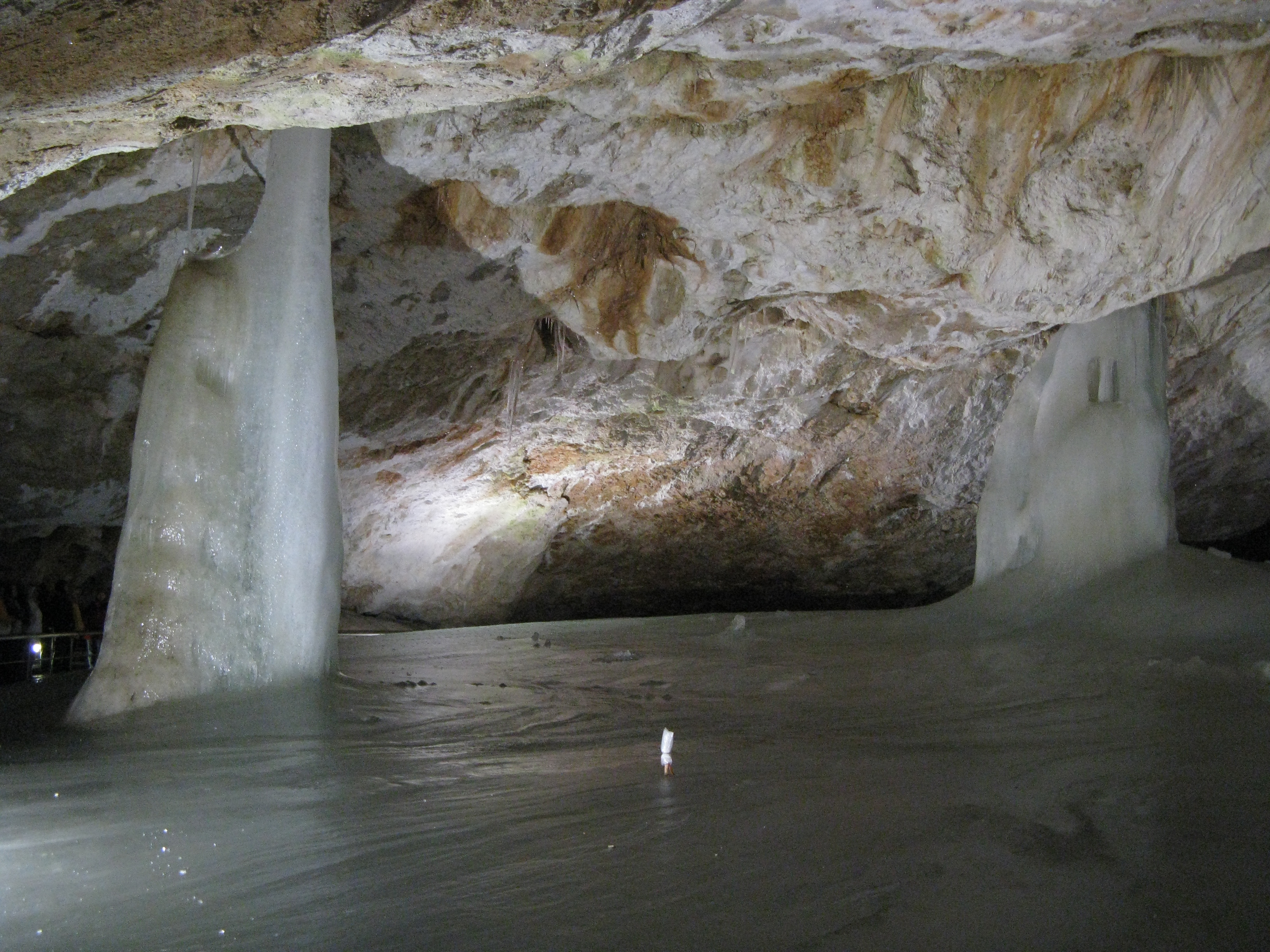
Dobšiná Ice Cave, one of several accessible caves listed in UNESCO

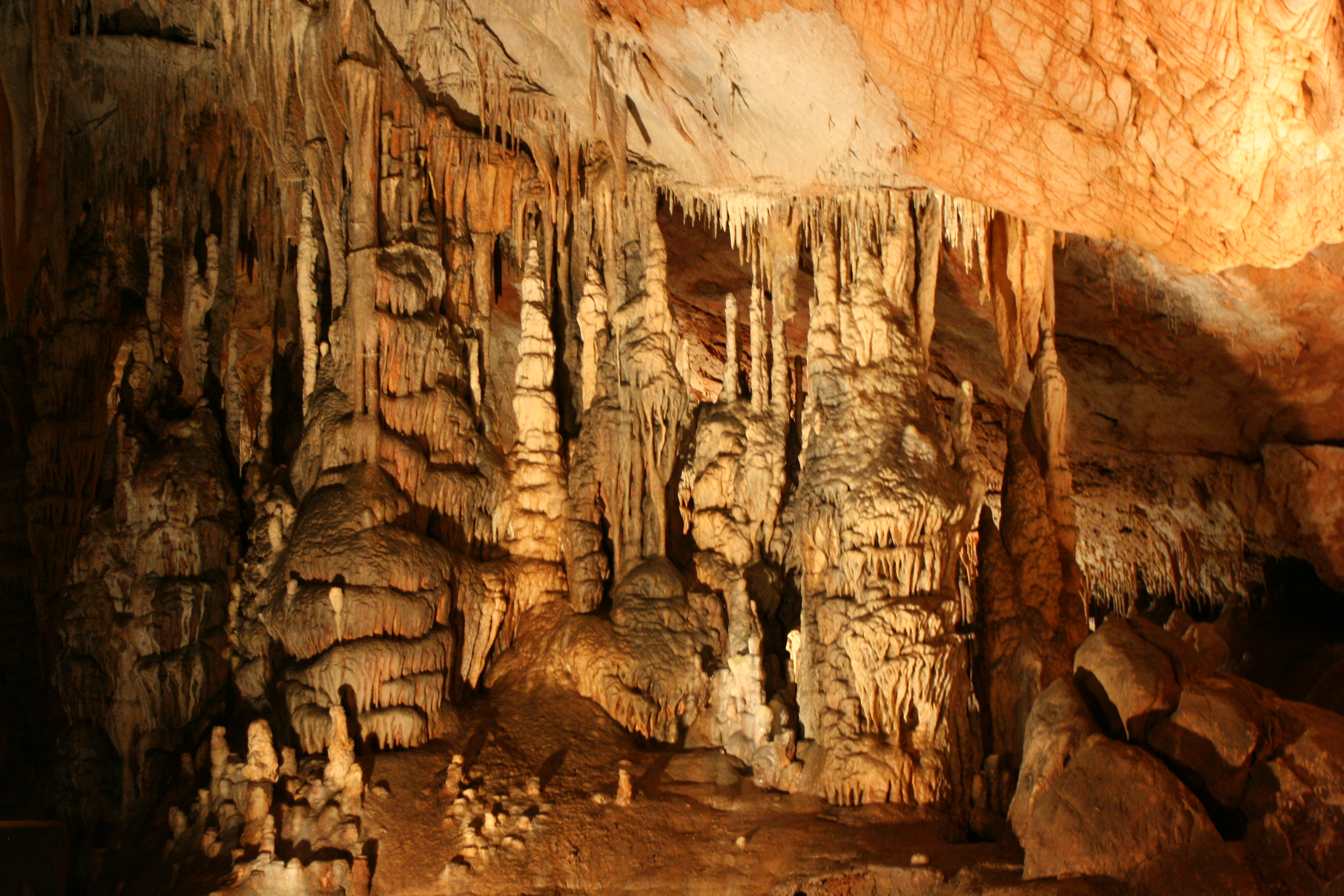
Domica cave, which is connected with Baradla cave in Hungary

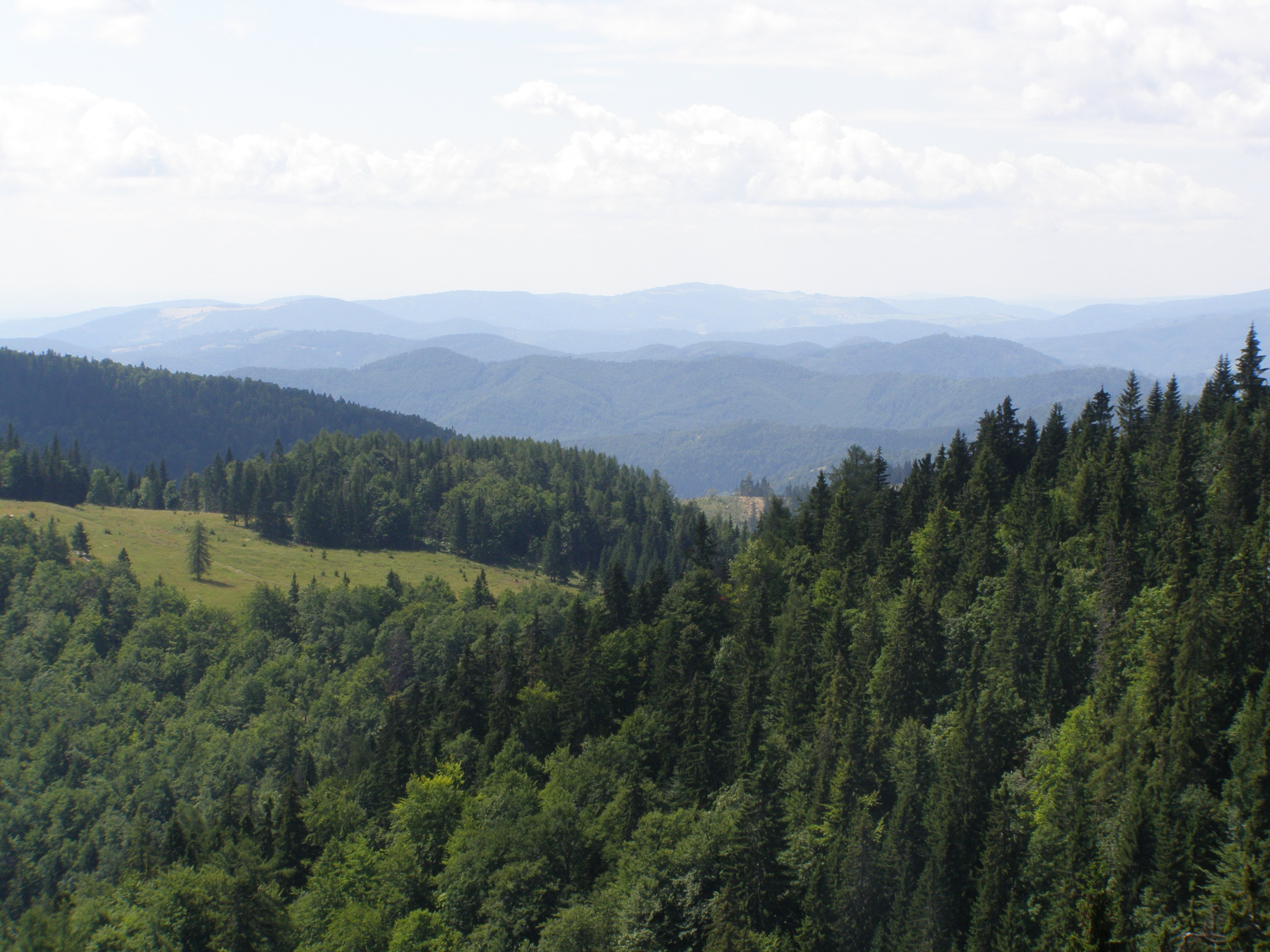
Muránska planina, national park

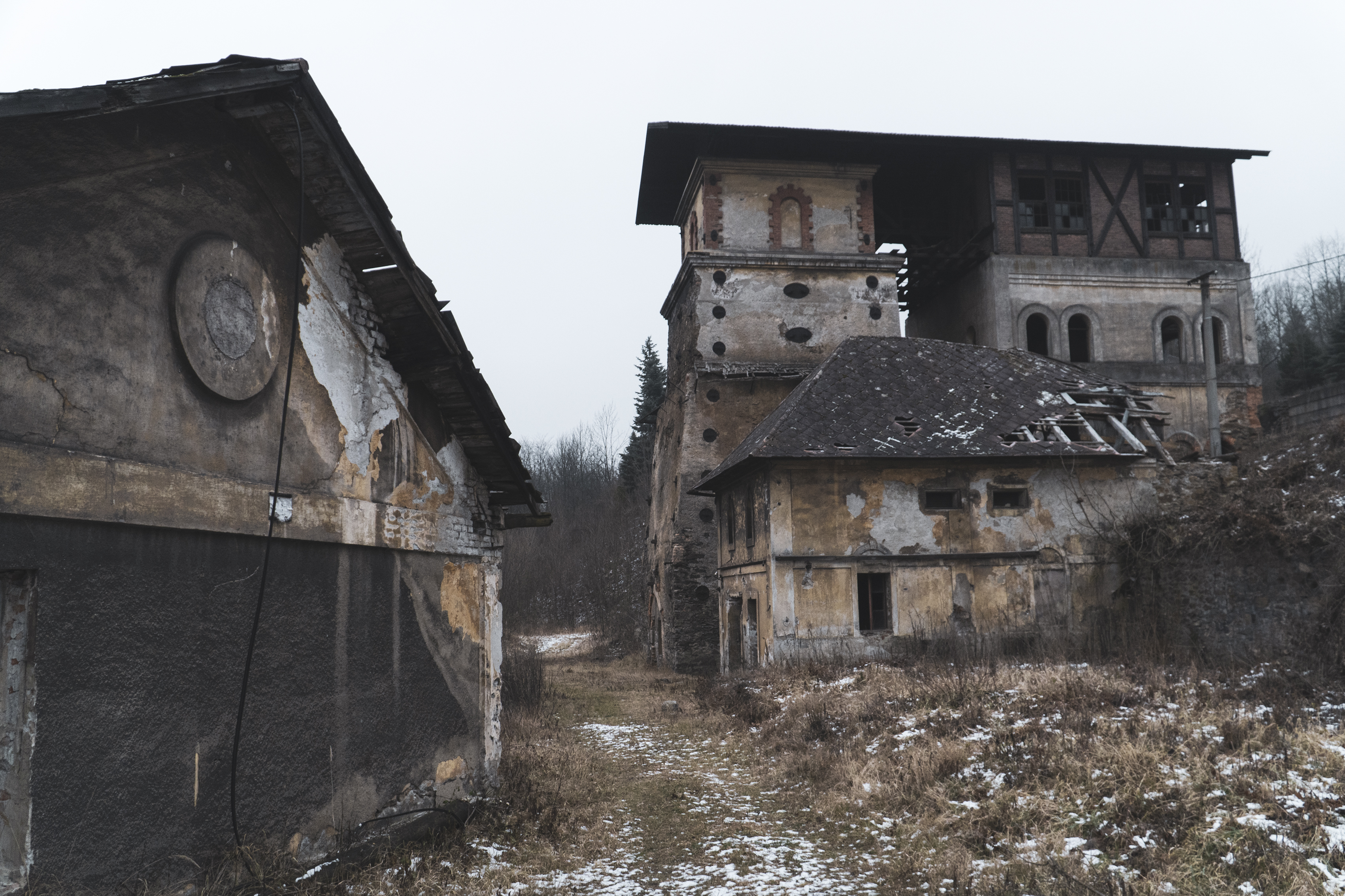
Huta Etelka, one of preserved steel mills, which was built in 1867 by "Iron Count" Mano Andrássy

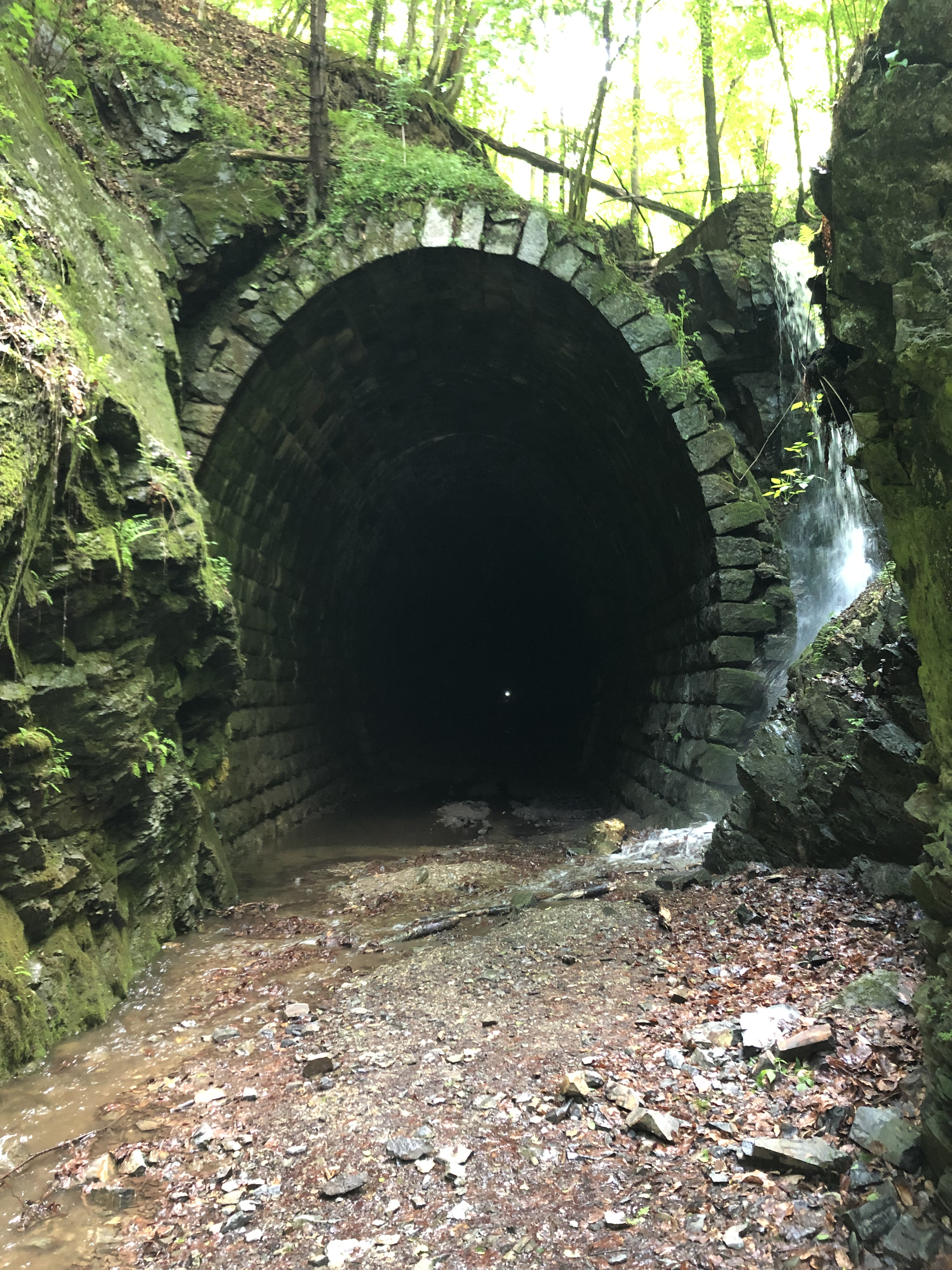
Slavošovský tunnel, freely accessible 2,4 km long, never finished railway tunnel; Now a tourist attraction

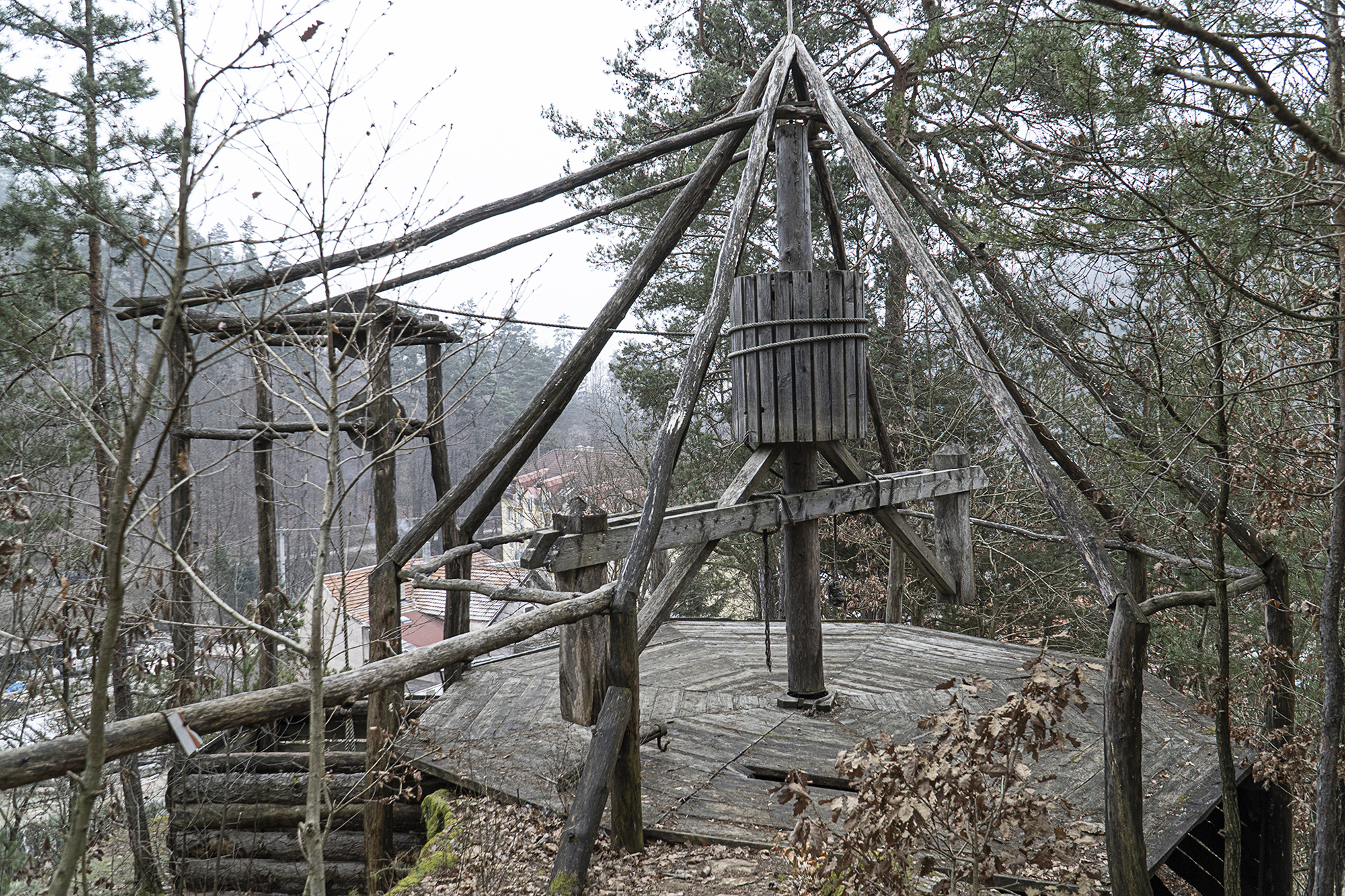
Replica of medieval mining device in Čučma near Rožňava

== Notable historical figures ==
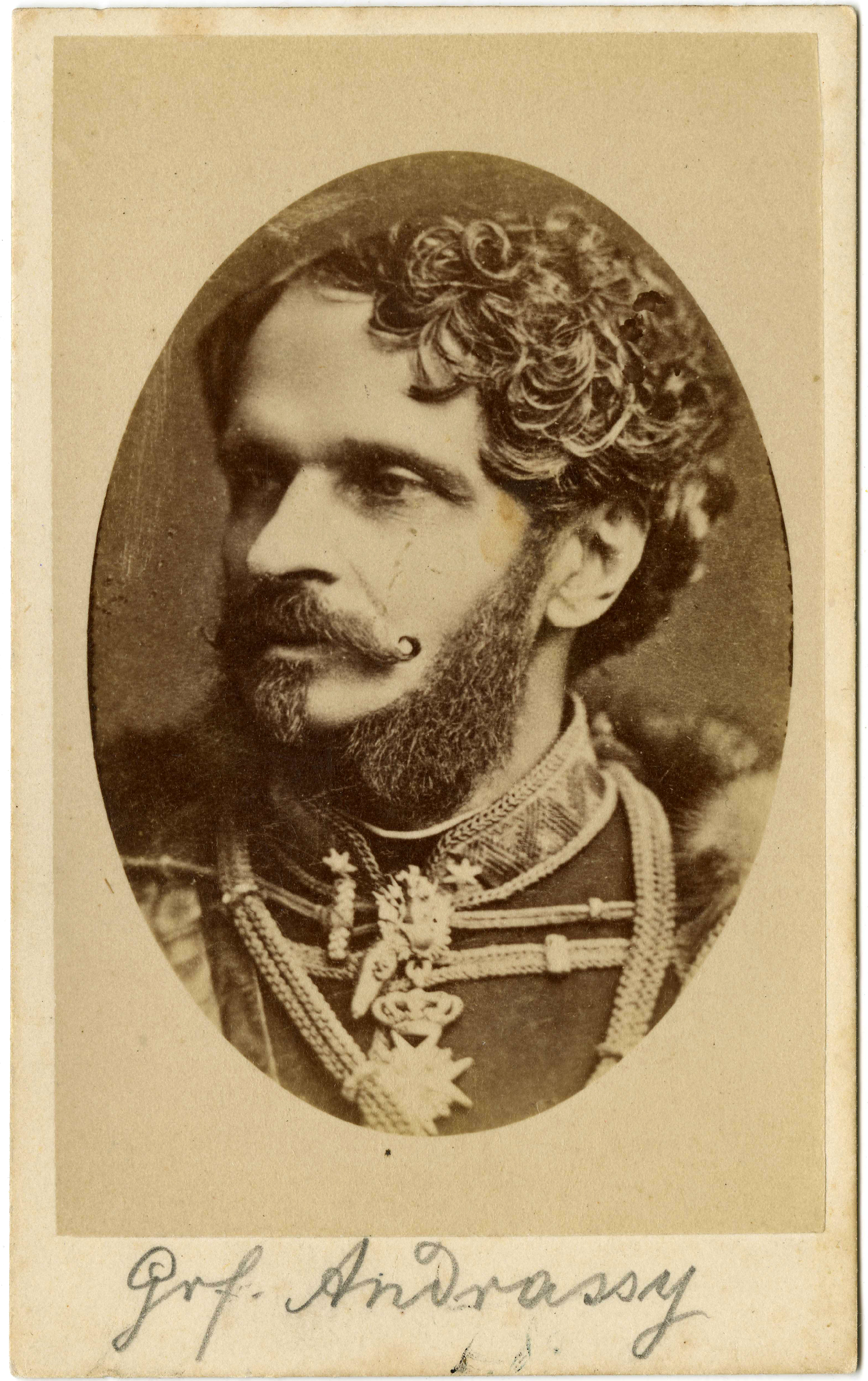
One of best known natives of Gemer is Gyula Andrássy, Hungarian politician and Prime Minister

- Manó Andrássy, Hungarian nobleman, responsible for the development of mining in region
- Gyula Andrássy, Foreign Minister of Austria-Hungary and Prime Minister of Hungary
- Ludwig Greiner, German forestry and land manager, who as first correctly triangulated the highest peak of Carpathians
- Mihály Tompa, Hungarian poet
- Ivan Krasko, Slovak poet
- Jur Hronec, Slovak mathematician
- Pavol Emanuel Dobšinský, Slovak collector of folklore and romantic writer
- Pavel Jozef Šafárik, Slovak philologist, poet, ethnographer and Slavist
- Samo Tomášik, Slovak romantic poet and prosaist
- Rudolf Viest, Slovak general, one of leaders of Slovak National uprising
- Vladimír Clementis, Slovak communist politician

== See also ==
- List of traditional regions of Slovakia
