= Rákoš, Revúca District =

Rákoš Gömörrákos
- Municipality
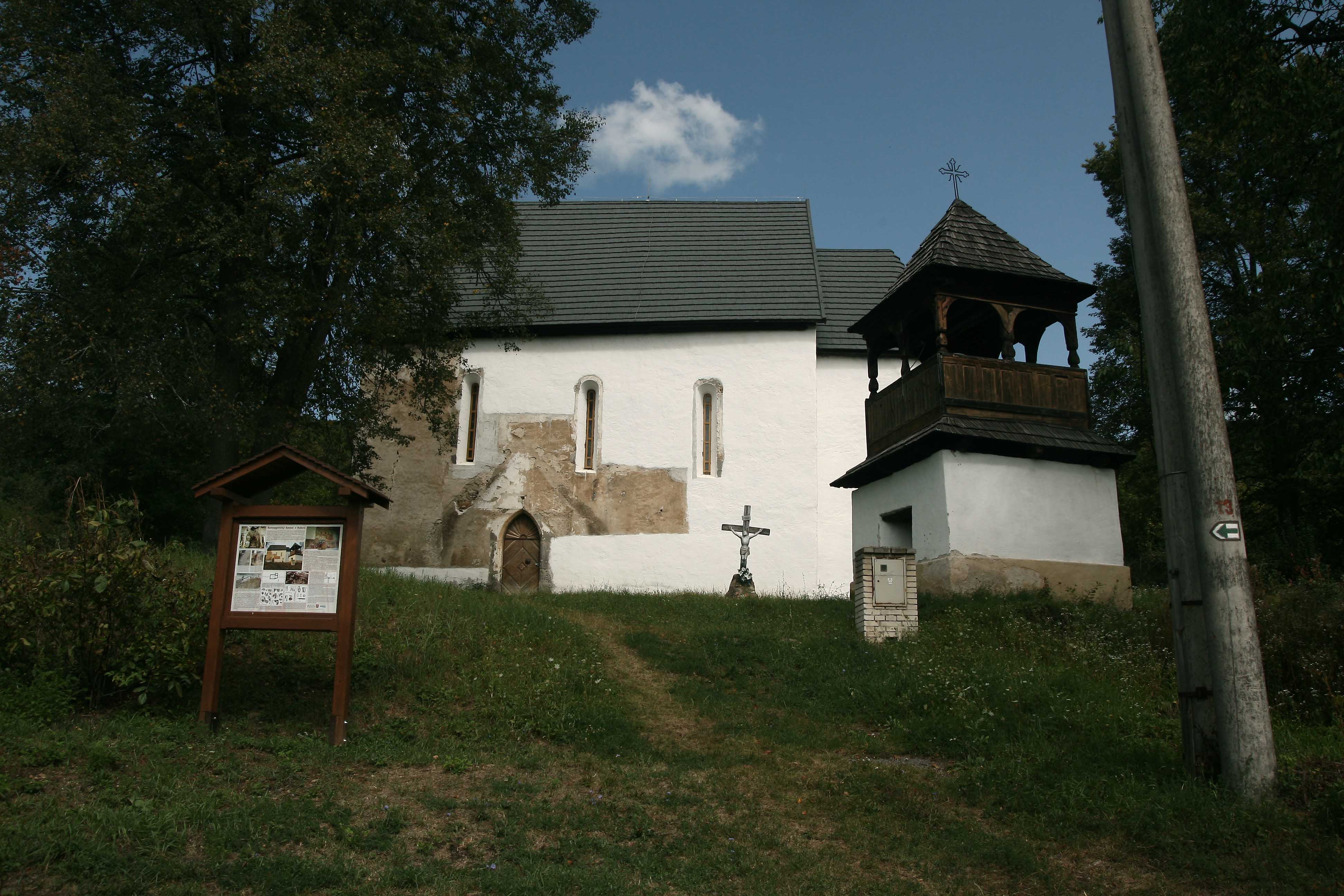

- Flag

- Location of Rákoš in the Banská Bystrica Region Location of Rákoš in Slovakia
- Coordinates: 48°36′05″N 20°08′53″E
- Country: Slovakia
- Region: Banská Bystrica Region
- District: Revúca District
- First mentioned: 1318

Area
  - Total: 13.02 km^{2} (5.03 sq mi)
- Elevation: 352 m (1,155 ft)

Population (2025)
  - Total: 394
- Time zone: UTC+1 (CET)
  - Summer (DST): UTC+2 (CEST)
- Postal code: 496 1
- Area code: +421 58
- Vehicle registration plate (until 2022): RA
- Website: www.obec-rakos.sk

Rákoš (Hungarian: Gömörrákos) is a village and municipality in Revúca District in the Banská Bystrica Region of Slovakia. The closest major city is Jelšava.

== Mining ==
The region in which Rákoš is in sits on deposits of Iron and Mercury.

== Population ==
Population statistic (10 years)
Year	1995	2005	2015	2025
Count	391	424	431	394
Difference		+8.43%	+1.65%	−8.58%

Population statistic
Year	2024	2025
Count	402	394
Difference		−1.99%

It has a population of 394 people (31 December 2025).

=== Ethnicity ===
Census 2021 (1+ %)
Ethnicity	Number	Fraction
Slovak	398	97.31%
Romani	9	2.2%
Not found out	9	2.2%
Hungarian	5	1.22%
Total	409	

In year 2021 was 409 people by ethnicity 398 as Slovak, 9 as Romani, 9 as Not found out, 5 as Hungarian and 2 as Czech.

Note on population: The difference values of population numbers in the table "Population statistic" and in the sections "Ethnicity" & "Religion" is caused by the use of various statistical methods.

=== Religion ===
Census 2021 (1+ %)
Religion	Number	Fraction
None	188	45.97%
Roman Catholic Church	112	27.38%
Evangelical Church	88	21.52%
Not found out	7	1.71%
Total	409	

In year 2021 was 409 people by religion 188 from None, 112 from Roman Catholic Church, 88 from Evangelical Church, 7 from Not found out, 4 from Jehovah's Witnesses, 4 from Greek Catholic Church, 2 from United Methodist Church, 2 from Seventh-day Adventist Church, 1 from Church of Jesus Christ of Latter-day Saints and 1 from Baptists Church.
