= Kuraľany =

Kuraľany Kural
- Municipality
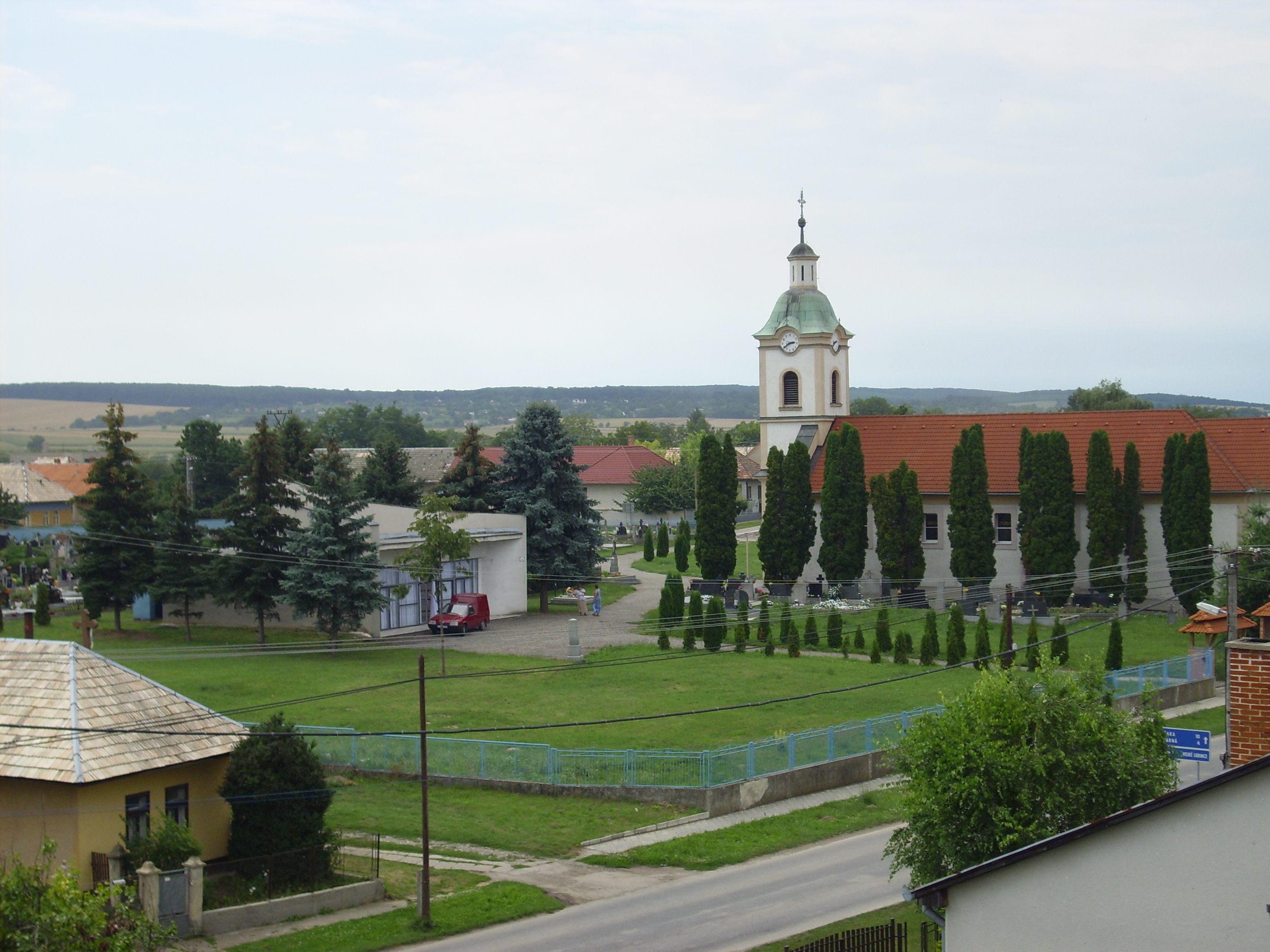

- Flag Coat of arms

- Location of Kuraľany in the Nitra Region Location of Kuraľany in Slovakia
- Coordinates: 47.98°N 18.55°E
- Country: Slovakia
- Region: Nitra Region
- District: Levice District
- First mentioned: 1223

Area
  - Total: 10.68 km^{2} (4.12 sq mi)
- Elevation: 159 m (522 ft)

Population (2025)
  - Total: 438
- Time zone: UTC+1 (CET)
  - Summer (DST): UTC+2 (CEST)
- Postal code: 935 64
- Area code: +421 36
- Vehicle registration plate (until 2022): LV
- Website: www.kuralany.sk

Kuraľany (Hungarian: Kural) is a village and municipality in the Levice District in the Nitra Region of Slovakia.

== History ==
In historical records the village was first mentioned in 1223.

== Geography ==
The municipality lies at an altitude of 159 metres (522 ft) and covers an area of 10.68 km^{2} (4.12 sq mi) (2025).

== Population ==
Population statistic (10 years)
Year	1995	2005	2015	2025
Count	617	572	520	438
Difference		−7.29%	−9.09%	−15.76%

Population statistic
Year	2024	2025
Count	449	438
Difference		−2.44%

It has a population of 438 people (31 December 2025).

=== Ethnicity ===
Census 2021 (1+ %)
Ethnicity	Number	Fraction
Slovak	441	92.84%
Hungarian	20	4.21%
Not found out	18	3.78%
Czech	5	1.05%
Total	475	

In year 2021 was 475 people by ethnicity 441 as Slovak, 20 as Hungarian, 18 as Not found out, 5 as Czech, 2 as German, 1 as Silesian, 1 as Austrian, 1 as Moravian and 1 as English.

Note on population: The difference values of population numbers in the table "Population statistic" and in the sections "Ethnicity" & "Religion" is caused by the use of various statistical methods.

=== Religion ===
Census 2021 (1+ %)
Religion	Number	Fraction
Roman Catholic Church	386	81.26%
None	57	12%
Not found out	17	3.58%
Calvinist Church	5	1.05%
Evangelical Church	5	1.05%
Total	475	

In year 2021 was 475 people by religion 386 from Roman Catholic Church, 57 from None, 17 from Not found out, 5 from Calvinist Church, 5 from Evangelical Church, 2 from Christian Congregations in Slovakia, 1 from Other, 1 from Greek Catholic Church and 1 from Ad hoc movements.

== Facilities ==
The village has a public library and football pitch.
