= Nižná Slaná =

Village and municipality in Slovakia

Nižná Slaná Alsósajó
- Municipality
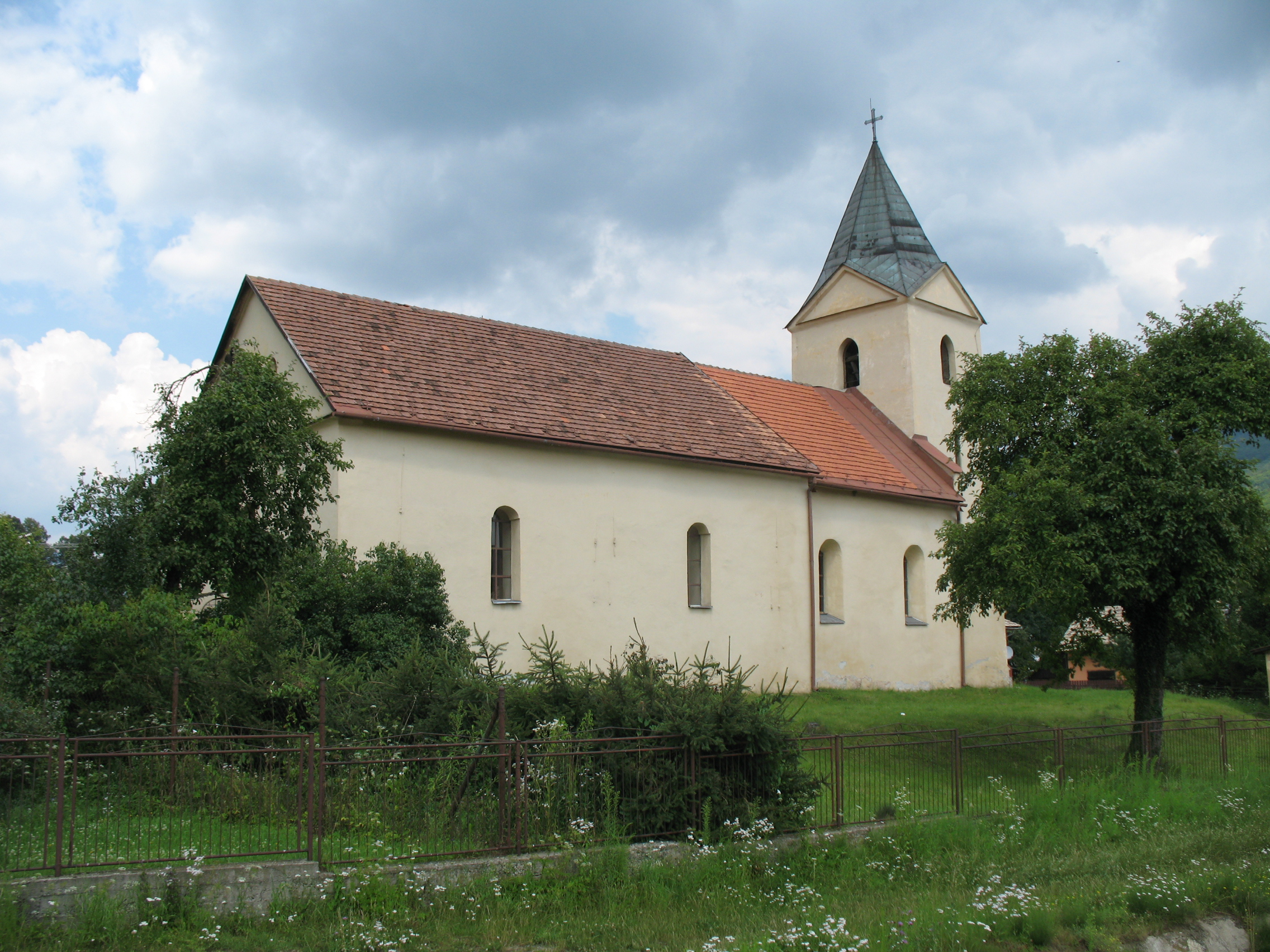

- Flag

- Location of Nižná Slaná in the Košice Region Location of Nižná Slaná in Slovakia
- Coordinates: 48.73°N 20.42°E
- Country: Slovakia
- Region: Košice Region
- District: Rožňava District
- First mentioned: 1360

Area
  - Total: 18.88 km^{2} (7.29 sq mi)
- Elevation: 361 m (1,184 ft)

Population (2025)
  - Total: 1,227
- Time zone: UTC+1 (CET)
  - Summer (DST): UTC+2 (CEST)
- Postal code: 492 3
- Area code: +421 58
- Vehicle registration plate (until 2022): RV
- Website: www.niznaslana.sk

Nižná Slaná (Hungarian: Alsósajó) is a village and municipality in the Rožňava District in the Košice Region of middle-eastern Slovakia.

== History ==
In historical records the village was first mentioned in 1360. Before the establishment of independent Czechoslovakia in 1918, Nižná Slaná was part of Gömör and Kishont County within the Kingdom of Hungary. From 1939 to 1945, it was part of the Slovak Republic.

== Geography ==
The municipality lies at an altitude of 361 metres (1,184 ft) and covers an area of 18.88 km^{2} (7.29 sq mi) (2025).

== Population ==
Population statistic (10 years)
Year	1995	2005	2015	2025
Count	1088	1209	1249	1227
Difference		+11.12%	+3.30%	−1.76%

Population statistic
Year	2024	2025
Count	1240	1227
Difference		−1.04%

It has a population of 1227 people (31 December 2025).

=== Ethnicity ===
Census 2021 (1+ %)
Ethnicity	Number	Fraction
Slovak	1143	94.93%
Not found out	48	3.98%
Romani	41	3.4%
Total	1204	

In year 2021 was 1204 people by ethnicity 1143 as Slovak, 48 as Not found out, 41 as Romani, 10 as Hungarian, 4 as Czech, 2 as Russian and 1 as Rusyn.

Note on population: The difference values of population numbers in the table "Population statistic" and in the sections "Ethnicity" & "Religion" is caused by the use of various statistical methods.

=== Religion ===
Census 2021 (1+ %)
Religion	Number	Fraction
None	644	53.49%
Evangelical Church	278	23.09%
Roman Catholic Church	210	17.44%
Not found out	41	3.41%
Greek Catholic Church	13	1.08%
United Methodist Church	12	1%
Total	1204	

In year 2021 was 1204 people by religion 644 from None, 278 from Evangelical Church, 210 from Roman Catholic Church, 41 from Not found out, 13 from Greek Catholic Church, 12 from United Methodist Church, 2 from Calvinist Church, 1 from Old Catholic Church, 1 from Hinduism, 1 from Buddhism and 1 from Ad hoc movements.

== Culture ==
The village has a public library, a gymnasium and a football pitch.
