= Desiderius Rátót =

Hungarian baron (died 1307)

Desiderius (I) Rátót

Ispán of Borsod
- Reign: 1299–1308
- Predecessor: James Borsa (?)
- Successor: Blaise Fonyi (1325)
- Died: after 1308
- Noble family: gens Rátót
- Spouse: N Ákos
- Issue: Benedict Kaplai; Ladislaus Feledi; Nicholas II
- Father: Leustach II

Desiderius (I) from the kindred Rátót (Hungarian: Rátót nembeli (I.) Dezső; died after 1308) was a Hungarian nobleman and soldier, who served as ispán of Borsod and Gömör counties at the turn of the 13th and 14th centuries. He was the ancestor of the Kaplai (or Serkei) and Feledi noble families.

== Family ==
In contemporary records, he was also called Desiderius the Blind (Hungarian: Vak Dezső). He was born into the influential and prestigious gens (clan) Rátót, as the son of magister Leustach II. His grandfather was Dominic I, who was killed in the Battle of Mohi in 1241. Desiderius had a brother Roland II, ancestor of the Jolsvai family and a notable baron of the so-called feudal anarchy, who served as Palatine of Hungary. Desiderius married an unidentified daughter of Stephen Ákos, a powerful oligarch in Northern Hungary, whose another daughter was the wife of Beke Borsa. These marriages established a strong relationship and alliance between the three kindreds.

Desiderius had three sons; Benedict married Margaret Telegdi, and was the first member of the Kaplai (also Serkei) family, which later had divided into two another branches (Lorántfi and Dezsőfi) and flourished until the early 16th century. Desiderius' second son Ladislaus was the ancestor of the Feledi family, which remained a marginal kinship in Gömör County. The third son was Nicholas II, who had a son Ladislaus (born 1361, and died without heirs) and a daughter Elizabeth.

== Life and career ==
Desiderius first appeared in contemporary records in 1275. During the political crisis of 1280, King Ladislaus IV adopted new Cuman laws under the pressure of the Catholic Church. However, many Cumans decided to leave Hungary instead of obeying the papal legate Philip's demands. On their way to the frontier, they ravaged and looted many settlements and estates. Desiderius, his brother Roland and two of his cousins, Rathold II and Nicholas "Vecse" successfully defended the Cistercian monastery at Egres (present-day Igriș in Romania). Thereafter Desiderius and several other members of the Rátót clan participated in the royal military campaigns against the Cumans. Desiderius was present at the siege of Gede Castle (present-day Hodejov, Slovakia), where the rebellious Finta Aba barricaded himself in mid-1281. He also fought against the Cumans in the battle at Lake Hód (near present-day Hódmezővásárhely) in 1282. It is plausible he had a strong relationship with his future father-in-law Stephen Ákos, who also participated in these clashes.

By the 1290s, when royal power was severely weakened, Stephen Ákos established a province, which laid mostly in Borsod and Gömör Counties, and ruled de facto independently his dominion during the era of feudal anarchy. Desiderius served as ispán of Gömör County at least since 1290. He held the position at least until 1304. Simultaneously, he was also made ispán of Borsod County around 1299. He held the office even in 1308. As both counties were ruled by Stephen Ákos, it is plausible that Desiderius belonged to his familia, and managed the administrative affairs of the territories on behalf of his father-in-law. Politically, he was rather tied to the Ákos clan, than his blood relatives, who ruled roughly Nógrád and Heves counties under the leadership of Desiderius' cousin Dominic II Rátót. Desiderius resided in Serke (present-day Širkovce, Slovakia) in Gömör County. He built a castle there sometimes in the 1290s or 1300s. He was granted the village of Héty from Stephen Ákos and his sons in 1304; the settlement originally laid in Borsod County, but after a donation, it has been moved administratively to Gömör County. Desiderius became the owner of Hidegkút (today Studená, Slovakia) under the contract.

After the extinction of the Árpád dynasty in 1301, he supported the claim of Wenceslaus of Bohemia during the civil war, alongside his relatives. Desiderius attended the wedding of his brother-in-law Stephen Ákos, Jr. and a foreign (Bavarian or Bohemian) princess in February 1303 in Diósgyőr. Following the political orientation of his father-in-law and lord Stephen Ákos, Desiderius took an oath of allegiance to the other pretender Charles of Anjou sometimes between 1304 and 1307. Desiderius was present at the Diet of Rákos on 10 October 1307, which confirmed Charles' claim to the throne. Desiderius Rátót was last mentioned as a living person by a document issued on 11 July 1308.

== Sources ==
- Engel, Pál (1996). Magyarország világi archontológiája, 1301–1457, I [Secular Archontology of Hungary, 1301–1457, Volume I] (in Hungarian). História, MTA Történettudományi Intézete. ISBN 963-8312-44-0.
- Kis, Péter (1998). "Ákos nembeli István". In Tusor, Péter (ed.). R. Várkonyi Ágnes emlékkönyv születésének 70. évfordulója ünnepére [A Memory Book for Ágnes R. Várkonyi to Commemorate the 70th Anniversary of Her Birth] (in Hungarian). Eötvös Loránd University. pp. 57–78. ISBN 963-4631-41-X.
- Kristó, Gyula (1999). "I. Károly király főúri elitje (1301–1309) [The Aristocratic Elite of King Charles I, 1301–1309]". Századok (in Hungarian). 133 (1). Magyar Történelmi Társulat: 41–62. ISSN 0039-8098.
- Zsoldos, Attila (2011). Magyarország világi archontológiája, 1000–1301 [Secular Archontology of Hungary, 1000–1301] (in Hungarian). História, MTA Történettudományi Intézete. ISBN 978-963-9627-38-3.

Desiderius I Genus Rátót Born: ? Died: after 1308
Political offices
Preceded by Stephen Ákos (?)	Ispán of Gömör; 1290–1304	Succeeded by Philip Drugeth (1320)
Preceded by James Borsa (?)	Ispán of Borsod; 1299–1308	Succeeded by Blaise Fonyi (1325)
