= Maurice Csák =

Hungarian Dominican friar

Blessed Maurice Csák O.P.
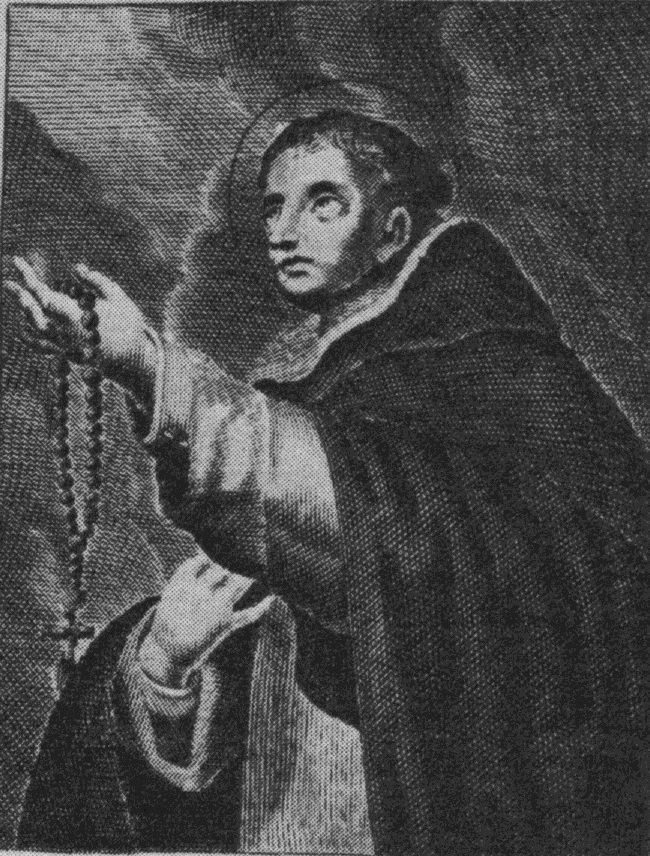
- Maurice Csák, as depicted in Gábor Hevenesi's Ungaricae Sanctitatis Indicia (1692)

Master of Peace and Consolation
- Born: c. 1270; Ugod, Hungary
- Died: 20 March 1336; Győr, Hungary
- Venerated in: Roman Catholic Church (Hungary & the Dominican Order)
- Beatified: 1494 by Pope Alexander VI
- Feast: 13 November; 20 March (Dominicans)

Maurice Csák (Hungarian: Csák nembeli Móric, Latin: frater Mauritius; c. 1270 – 20 March 1336) was a Hungarian Dominican friar. He was beatified by Pope Alexander VI in 1494.

== Early life ==
Maurice was born around 1270 into the Ugod branch of the prestigious and wealthy gens (clan) Csák, as the son of Demetrius Csák, Count of Bakony and an unidentified daughter of the powerful lord, Henry Kőszegi. According to his hagiography, Maurice was born in the fortress of Ugod in Veszprém County, his family's ancient estate. He had two siblings. His brother was Csák, who died without descendants before 1309. The legend says, he also entered the Dominican Order, but there is no contemporary record of this. His sister was Kunigunda (or Kinga), who married Julius Rátót.

According to his own legend, Virgin Mary appeared to his devout mother in a dream during her four months of pregnancy, when she had a high fever. Maurice's mother was afraid she wouldn't survive the child-birth. Mary predicted that she would survive and give birth to a son, who will be "well-pleasing to God and the people", and recalled her own parturition when the angel Gabriel appeared to Mary and announced her divine selection to be the mother of Jesus. As his hagiography says, the infant Maurice had suffered from a feverish disease until age of three. His education begun when he was five years old. He has already shown his religious sentiment in childhood; he prayed and disputed the life of saints at the age of ten, instead of "childish games and mischief". At one time, an old Dominican friar visited the castle of Ugod and told the story of the 4th-century monastic St. Alexius of Rome to the young Maurice, who, as a result, decided to choose the monastic way of life.

His father, Demetrius died in 1286 or 1287. Maurice inherited large-scale domains in Fejér, Veszprém, Sopron, Pozsony and Zala counties, becoming one of the wealthiest landowners in Transdanubia. Maurice was first mentioned by contemporary records in August 1291, when he and Csák, already as adults, confirmed their late father's donation of the village Mizsérd in Pozsony County to their familiaris, a certain Egidius, son of Bajk. Both of them were styled with the title of magister, when they donated the village of Csatabér (today belongs to Pápoc) to their relatives, Peter and John in the same document.

== Monastic vocation ==
Around 1301, Maurice Csák married Catherine Aba, the daughter of Palatine Amadeus Aba, who was one of the most powerful and wealthy barons of the Kingdom of Hungary at the turn of the 13th and 14th centuries. In order to finance the wedding, Maurice and his brother took a loan from certain lords Jekelin and Keneplin. According to the legend, Maurice and Catherine lived in marriage for three or four years. Thereafter they agreed to divorce with a common will and jointly entered the Dominican Order; Catherine became a nun in the monastery at Margaret Island, while Maurice joined to the convent in Buda. According to historian Ödön Málnási, the marriage of convenience created by their relatives was unbearable for the young couple. However, Maurice's father-in-law, Amadeus Aba was incensed by their decision, since it was accompanied by a large property loss. Dominican historian Lajos Implom considers, Maurice's brother, Csák died around 1305, thus frater Maurice and Catherine would have been the heirs of his wealth. Around 1307, Amadeus Aba instructed Ladislaus, son of Werner, the rector of Buda to take the couple out of the monasteries by force. Maurice and Catherine were dressed in secular clothes and locked together in one of the towers of Buda Castle. Despite the coercive measures, they insisted on their determination. Amadeus Aba saw that vain effort to persuade his daughter and Maurice. After half a year, they were released and were able to return to their convents. Thereafter, the Dominican friars sent Maurice to the Basilica of San Domenico in Bologna to stay away from Hungary. Maurice spent the next two or three years there.

A large portion of his properties were inherited by his closest living relative, Peter Csák, who sold his heritage, the castle of Ugod and its accessories to the powerful Transdanubian oligarch, Ivan Kőszegi (Maurice's maternal uncle) soon after. Charles I of Hungary approved the sale in 1308. Maurice distributed his fortune over the next decades: Returning to Hungary, in January 1309, he donated the family's important seat, Pápoc to the nuns of Margaret Island, where his mother and former wife lived. In March 1309, Maurice mortgaged the village of Balf in Sopron County to Jekelin and Keneplin in order to settle his debts, which were arose upon his wedding ceremony. His "relative", Nicholas Hahót was granted the villages of Komár and Galambok in Zala County by Maurice Csák in 1331, while he also donated Boglárfalu (near Székesfehérvár) to the Himfi family in 1332. In connection with the distribution of his wealth, his legend preserved a story: Maurice wished to recover his previously abandoned goods in order to donate them to the monastery of Margaret Island, but "king" Nicholas ["son of George"] refused his request after their conversation [in the autumn of 1313]. In response, Maurice prophesied that Nicholas will die within half a year because of his "harshness". For the specified time, Nicholas fell ill and called "his sons" [sic!], Bishop Nicholas of Győr and Andrew [in early 1314], and ordered them to hand over the goods for the monastery, according to Maurice's request, who predicted his death and thus "he has a holy and prophetic soul". Despite the many false data and misinterpretation, which evolved during the centuries, the characters presumably can be identified with his maternal relatives, Nicholas III Kőszegi (the head of the Kőszegi family during that time), Nicholas' brother Andrew and their natural uncle, Nicholas Kőszegi, Bishop of Győr. According to Ödön Málnási, however, the story narrates the feud between Maurice and his powerful and greedy father-in-law, Amadeus Aba, who was killed in violent circumstances in 1311, and his clan has ultimately lost its power.

He spent his life in various Dominican monasteries until his death. At first, he resided in Buda, then moved to St. Anthony monastery at Pest. Finally, he joined the convent of Győr, where he died. As a friar, Maurice Csák had an ascetic way of life. His legend emphasizes, he always prayed in all circumstances. Maurice was asleep on his chaff and he tormented his body with the toughest whipping. He played an active role in all of the activities of the monastery: mass celebrations, chant hymns, banging bells etc. He did not eat meat for thirty-two years and strictly adhered to fasting during church holidays. He wore poor and simple clothes. If he got expensive clothes from his relatives, he accepted the gift gratefully and passed them to his companions in the monastery. In response to the monks' question, he quoted a phrase from the Bible (Job 2.4): "Skin for skin. Yes, all that a man has will he give for his life". He also distributed his clothes to the poor. He also wore permanently a cilice. He behaved humbly, while avoided anger and indignation. He often acted as a mediator and conciliatory between the disputed parties. During Maurice's lifetime, various miracles were ascribed to his intercession, most of them referring to curing illnesses, even someone coming back from the dead. Once, Maurice and another friar were accommodated in a house of a man named Benedict at Vác. Maurice went to pray at the nearby church at night. He managed to do that despite both the gate of the house and the door of the church were closed. Benedict saw all the candles and lampions in the church were begin to light without human intervention. Another time, Maurice prayed in the church of St. Anthony in Pest at night, when an "evil spirit tried to bother him". During prayer, a corpse of a brutally murdered man awakened and wanted to get out of the bier. Maurice made the sign of the cross and said "Whoever you are, I command in the name our Lord Jesus Christ, to be still, and do not you dare disturb me anymore". Thereafter the corpse fell back to the bier. His legend also narrates that Maurice nursed a friar, lector Paul of Kraków dying of a feverish disease. When he brought and blessed the water, the patient was healed immediately.

Maurice Csák died in Győr on 20 March 1336, eleven days before Easter. His funeral was celebrated by Bishop Nicholas Kőszegi. During the ritual, Maurice's eyes opened twice for short moments and the corpse gave off a pleasant scent, according to his legend. He was buried in the convent of Győr. During a fire in 1566, then the raids of the Ottomans, the building of the monastery was destroyed and Maurice's remains also disappeared. The hagiography narrates that Maurice did miracles even after he died. At the hour of his death, a Dominican friar of the monastery of Győr, sub-prior Benedict, who traveled to Buda, had a dream: he saw his companions at the table of refectory, all of them wore hood but Maurice. The head of the Dominican province of Hungary also claimed that Maurice Csák appeared in shiny attire in his vision in the morning during his praying and announced his death. He also spoke of the trial waiting for him before God. The legend also says, when a blind man picked up a heap of earth from Maurice's grave, and daubed his eyes with those, he regained his eyesight.

== His hagiography ==
The original legend of Maurice Csák and its first transcriptions are lost. During his beatification, a list of his miracles were sent to the Ferrara Cathedral, but it has not survived. The first preserved version of his hagiography was written by Dominican preacher Girolamo Albertucci de Borselli in the appendix of his work, the "Cronica gestorum ac factorum memorabilium civitatis Bononie" (1497), alongside the legends of fellow Hungarian Dominicans Saint Margaret and Blessed Helena. These hagiographies were re-published by Dominican historians Ambrogio Taeggio, then Leandro Alberti in their chronicles. The legend was transcribed and annotated in 1637 by Sigismundus Ferrarius, head of the Dominicans in Hungary. The Acta Sanctorum, which was compiled by the Bollandists contains the Taeggio version of Maurice Csák's hagiography too, also with the name variants provided by Alberti. This version was first published in Hungary in 1743. Due to the various transcriptions in the previous centuries, the name of persons and locations were frequently misinterpreted and mistranslated.

According to the tradition, Maurice Csák was beatified in 1494. One of the frescos of the Church of San Nicolò in Treviso by Tommaso da Modena (1352) depicts Maurice Csák with the caption "B. Fr. Mauritius de Provincia Hungariae Ord. Fratrum pred. fuit nobilitatis, mansuetudinis et humilitatis decus preclarissimum, puritatis et munditie fios venustum, in multis claurit miraculis".

== Sources ==
- Implom, Lajos (2017). Adatok a Szent Domonkos-rend magyarországi rendtartományának történetéhez. A rendtartomány alapításától 1526-ig [Data on the History of the Order of Saint Dominic in Hungary. From the Foundation of the Province to 1526] (in Hungarian). Domonkos Rendtörténeti Gyűjtemény. ISBN 978-615-00-0613-0.
- Madas, Edit (2001). "Boldog Csáki Móric élete [Life of Blessed Maurice Csák]". In Madas, Edit; Klaniczay, Gábor (eds.). Legendák és csodák (13–16. század). Szentek a magyar középkorból II (in Hungarian). Osiris Kiadó. pp. 331–341. ISBN 963-389-123-X.
- Málnási, Ödön (1930). "Boldog Csáki Móric élete [Life of Blessed Maurice Csák]". Credo (in Hungarian). 8 (6): 1–7.
