= Roland I Rátót =

Hungarian lord

Roland (I) Rátót
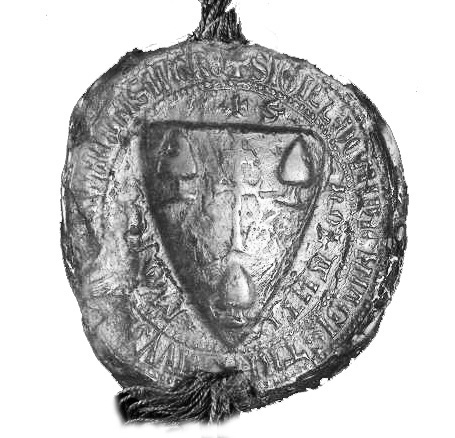
- Seal of Roland I Rátót in 1255

Palatine of Hungary
- Reign: 1248–1260
- Predecessor: Denis Türje
- Successor: Henry Kőszegi
- Born: c. 1215
- Died: 1277 or 1278
- Noble family: gens Rátót
- Spouse: unknown
- Issue: Matthias Paksi; Rathold II
- Father: Dominic I

Roland (I) from the kindred Rátót (Hungarian: Rátót nembeli (I.) Roland; died 1277 or 1278) was a Hungarian influential lord, who held several important secular positions for decades. He was also the ancestor of the Paksi family.

== Family ==
Roland I was born around 1215 into the gens Rátót as the son of Dominic I, who served as Master of the treasury from 1238 to 1240. He was killed in the Battle of Mohi in 1241. The ancestors of the kindred were two Norman knights (Oliver and Rathold) from Caserta, Naples, who settled down in Hungary around 1097 during the reign of Coloman, King of Hungary. Roland's earliest known ancestor was his great-grandfather Leustach I Rátót, Voivode of Transylvania in the second half of the 12th century. Roland had three brothers, Stephen, the forefather of the Pásztói, Tari and Kakas de Kaza noble families. The Putnoki family came from Oliver I. Leustach II was the father of Palatine Roland II Rátót and also the ancestor of the Jolsvai, Serkei and Feledi branches. Their only unidentified sister married Maurice II Pok whom the influential baron Nicholas Pok originated.

Roland had two sons from his unidentified wife: Matthias and Rathold II (fl. 1278–1296). The latter one had no any descendants. Matthias, who soon adopted the Paksi (or Paksy) surname, married one of the daughters of Paul Visontai from the Kompolt branch of the kindred Aba. Their two sons were Roland and Oliver Paksi, who held important positions during the reign of Louis I of Hungary.

== Early career ==
He was first mentioned by contemporary records in 1241, when he held the dignity of Master of the cupbearers following the Mongol invasion of Hungary and his father's death, who perished in the battlefield at Mohi. Roland was soon replaced by his brother-in-law Maurice II Pok in that position. According to László Markó, Roland might have been in office until the next year. When King Béla IV returned to Hungary in May 1242, after the withdrawal of the Mongols, Roland also escorted his monarch. Thus he spent the previous months in Dalmatia too, where the Hungarian royal court found shelter. From 1242 to 1245 (or from 1241 to 1246, according to non-authentic charters), he served as Master of the stewards, beside that he also governed Nyitra County (1242–1243), then Sopron County (1244–1245).

In 1246, he led Béla's royal campaign against Frederick II, Duke of Austria, who had attacked Hungary and claimed the western counties of Moson, Sopron and Vas County. Roland fortified and defended Sopron and Pozsony Castle, but Frederick's army successfully besieged and captured them (according to Veronika Rudolf, this skirmish occurred during the Mongol invasion took place five years earlier). Later Roland's army, also consisted of Cumans led by Alpra and the auxiliary troops of Rostislav Mikhailovich, was defeated by the Austrians in the Battle of the Leitha River on 15 June 1246, however Frederick was killed on the battlefield, resulting in the end of the conflict and interregnum in Austria. Following this, Roland was appointed Judge royal in 1247 and held the dignity possibly until 1248.

== First term as Palatine ==
Roland was appointed Palatine in 1248, serving in that capacity unusually long period of time in that era, until 1260 as loyal to King Béla IV. He was also ispán of Pozsony County during that time (1248–1260) and ispán of Sopron County for a short time in 1255 (his seal preserved in that year). Before Roland, the palatines acted as itinerant judges, wandering in the whole realm in the 1230s and early 1240s. However he abandoned this practice and mostly heard cases in Pressburg (now Bratislava in Slovakia). During the Árpádian royals, Roland was the Palatine, who issued the majority of diplomas with accurate dates and locations. Most of his judgments connected to the kingdom's northwestern region. For instance, he issued his charters in Pressburg in 1249, 1251, 1252 (four), 1253 (three) and 1255 (two or three). Furthermore he also resided in Oltva (a settlement in Győr County which no longer exists), Vasvár, Trencsén (today Trenčín, Slovakia), Vaska, Muraszombat (today Murska Sobota, Slovakia), Győr, Mórichida and Regede (today Bad Radkersburg, Austria), when performed his palatinal judicial powers. He was the last Palatine, who judged over the Pannonhalma Archabbey (in 1254 and 1255), the monastery received waiver of privileges sometime later. During his term, the dignity gradually became a political office, overshadowing its former "traditional" functions (e.g. litigation).

During his 12-year-term, Roland acted in at least 44 lawsuits, 28 of them were preserved in their entirety by contemporary charters. Accordingly, he acted as Palatine mostly in Transdanubia and permanently resided in Pressburg, where he was ispán. There Roland was also responsible for the protection of the northwest border (Pozsony and Sopron Counties) against Austria. When Béla IV revised his predecessors' land grants and reclaimed former royal estates, which greatly affected Pozsony County, Roland was entrusted with the implementation. Historian Kornél Szovák claimed Roland Rátót employed the clerical staff of the Pressburg chapel as his literate personnel.

In 1254, Palatine Roland participated in drafting of peace treaty, which was signed in his residence, Pressburg on 1 May. In accordance with the treaty, Ottokar, who had in the meantime become King of Bohemia, ceded the Duchy of Styria to Béla, who also adopted the title Duke. He helped Béla IV in organizing and consolidating the Hungarian administration in Styria, he stayed Bad Radkersburg (Regede) several times in the 1250s. Discontented with the Hungarian rule, the Styrian lords sought assistance from Ottokar of Bohemia. Béla and his allies invaded Moravia, but Ottokar vanquished them in the Battle of Kressenbrunn on 12 June 1260. Roland also participated in the battle. The defeat forced Béla to renounce Styria in favor of the King of Bohemia in the Peace of Vienna, which was signed on 31 March 1261 following the intermediary activity of Roland Rátót, who negotiated with Ottokar for months in Austria on behalf of King Béla and Queen Maria Laskarina.

== Ban of Slavonia ==
In 1260, Roland was succeeded by Henry Kőszegi. During that time tensions emerged between King Béla IV and his eldest son Stephen. Béla's favoritism towards his younger son, Béla (whom he appointed Duke of Slavonia) and daughter, Anna irritated Stephen. Following the death of Stephen Gutkeled in 1259 or 1260, Roland became Ban of Slavonia, he appeared in contemporary sources in this capacity at first in August 1261. Roland served as the young prince's mentor and mainstay in accordance with King Béla's wish. As Ban, he acquired several lands and possessions to the south of the Drava River.

Although, Roland did not bore the title of Duke of Slavonia unlike his predecessors Denis Türje and Stephen Gutkeled, he had a significant influence over Dalmatian affairs. Roland was styled as comes (ispán or župan) of Trogir in the period between September 1262 and October 1267 with a brief interruption in 1263. According to Attila Zsoldos, Roland was also comes of Split (Spalato) between 1265 and 1267, but it is more likely he held the position from 1262 to 1268. After September 1267 (his dismissal as ban, see below), Roland was styled as simply "Dominus Rolandus egregius comes" in Dalmatia. Roland donated the fort of Četiglavac to the Diocese of Nin (Nona) and specifically its bishop of Hungarian-origin, Samson in 1266. Stephen V confirmed this donation in 1272. Roland's deputy was a certain Stephen, who held the title of the ban of maritime provinces from 1263 to 1266.

King Béla IV and Duke Stephen's conflict degenerated into civil war by the end of 1264. After a few months, Duke Stephen gained a decisive victory over his father's army in the Battle of Isaszeg in March 1265. Soon, Béla and Stephen signed the peace treaty in the Convent of the Blessed Virgin on the Rabbits' Island. Roland Rátót kept himself away the conflict, as he resided near Zagreb at that time. Following the peace, Stephen intended to punish limitedly the Cumans, with the approval of Béla, who had earlier betrayed him and joined the King's camp during the war. Béla provided a royal army to his son under the leadership of Roland, whose person was acceptable for Duke Stephen. Roland also participated in a campaign against the Second Bulgarian Empire in the summer of 1266, when Stephen invaded Bulgaria, seized Vidin, Pleven and other forts and routed the Bulgarians in five battles, resulting that Despot Jacob Svetoslav again accepted Stephen's suzerainty.

However, despite the former agreement, Roland soon became a political victim of the rivalry between Béla IV and Stephen. Under the influence of loyal barons' intrigues, King Béla dismissed Roland and replaced him with Henry Kőszegi in the summer of 1267. His estates were also plundered and destroyed in Slavonia. It is highly probable that Béla considered his participation in Duke Stephen's campaign against Bulgaria as a misuse of powers since the King gave him the army only for regularizing the Cuman tribes. Béla also could afraid that the skilled military leader Stephen gathered allies among his supporters during these expeditions. According to a royal document from 1270, issued by Stephen V, Roland lost Béla's confidence because of "the diatribe and accusations of his enemies" in the royal court.

== Later career ==
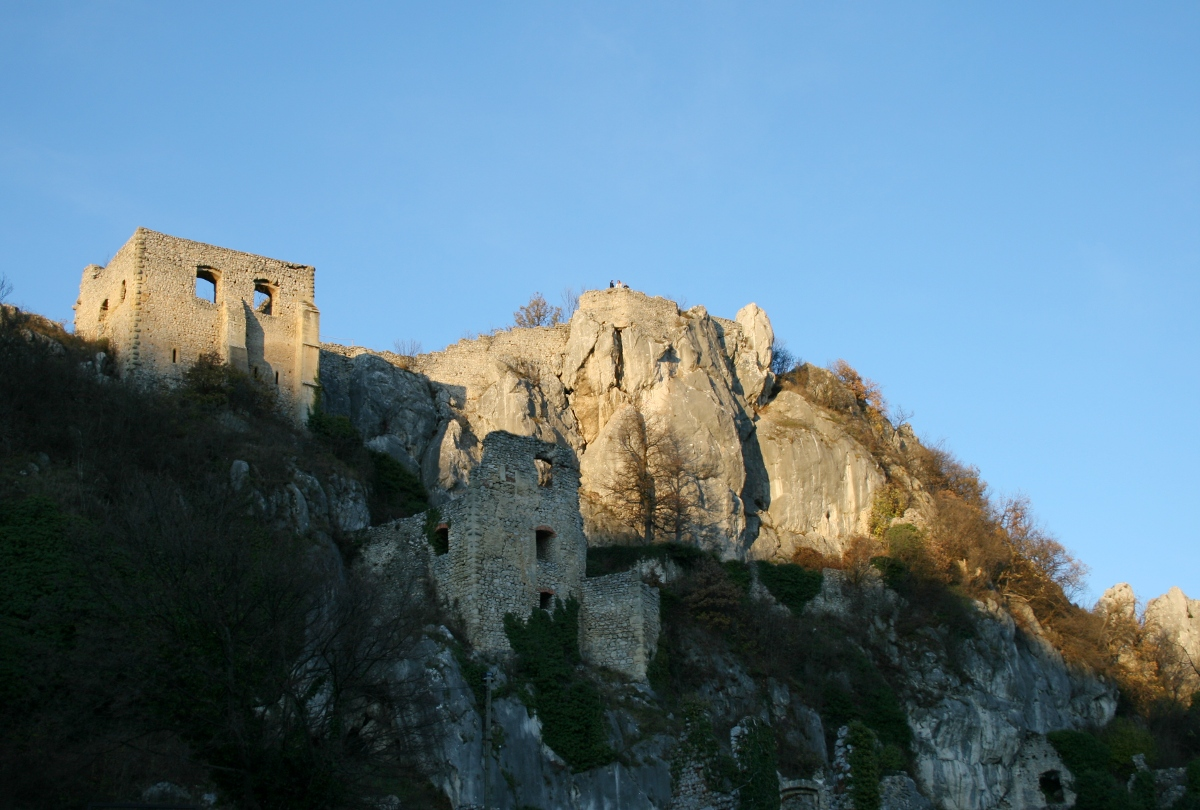
Kalnik Castle (present-day Croatia), owned by Roland Rátót since 1270

Stephen V ascended the Hungarian throne in 1270. During his short rule, he donated the Kalnik Castle and its surrounding areas to Roland, who also became perpetual count of Kalnik (Kemlék) ispánate. Alongside other merits, the donation letter also said Roland "is pleasant in conversation" and "he is able to endear himself with others", which reflects the impact of chivalric code in the royal court. Amidst a brief conflict between Hungary and Bohemia in the spring of 1271, Roland, alongside Bishop Paul Balog and cleric Thomas, was sent to Ottokar's court to negotiate with the Bohemian king, while Stephen V prepared for an open battle. Roland took part in the victorious battle on the Rábca river on 21 May 1271. Therefore, he was granted the right to collect collecta, an extraordinary tax of 7 denari in Slavonia. After Stephen's victory, Roland was among the envoys who negotiated with Ottokar's representatives in Marchegg. He was also present when the two monarchs signed the Peace of Pressburg on 2 July 1271, and himself he was among the guarantors of the document with the honorary title of simply "banus", which indicates his distinguished status even though he held no position at the time.

The sudden death of Stephen V and subsequent coronation of the 10-year-old Ladislaus IV in August 1272 allowed him to become one of the most powerful barons in the country. His influence increased further in November of that year when Duke Béla of Macsó was brutally assassinated by Henry Kőszegi and the barons partitioned the territory of the Duchy of Macsó among themselves. Roland Rátót became Palatine and the first Ban of Macsó. He was actively involved in the internal conflicts between the two baronial groups which emerged during the last decade of Béla IV. Initially Roland supported the Kőszegi–Gutkeled baronial group against the Csák faction. According to historian Jenő Szűcs, Roland has been able to reach the highest-ranking secular position for the second time in November 1272, because the two rival baronial groups and the nominal regent Dowager Queen Elizabeth the Cuman considered the semblance of unity as important in the first years yet. Szűcs considered, the elderly respected and prestigious barons, who were made palatines and other chief officials, such Denis Péc, Ernye Ákos and Roland Rátót, were considered stable points and "beauty spot" in the fast-changing governments during the first five regnal years of Ladislaus. By May 1273, Roland Rátót was replaced as Palatine and Ban by Lawrence, son of Kemény, an ally of the Kőszegi family, and Egidius Monoszló, respectively, however in the next month, he was again Palatine and held the dignity at least until October, when he was removed from office by the Kőszegis, alongside other members of the Csák baronial group. Roland gradually moved away from the Kőszegis' course line in the following months. During the Bohemian–Hungarian war in 1273, Roland was among the barons who led his troops to recapture Győr in May–June 1273. He was also involved in that campaign, after Ottokar's departure, which attempted to recapture Nagyszombat (today Trnava, Slovakia).

Following the Battle of Föveny in September 1274, where Henry Kőszegi was killed, Roland defected to the supporters of the Csák kindred, and could manage to become Palatine for a fourth term. Roland, along with the Csáks, proposed the wedding of Andrew, Duke of Slavonia (Ladislaus' brother) with Clementia (Rudolf's daughter) in late 1274. He held that dignity until June 1275, when the Kőszegis, despite the late Henry Kőszegi's betrayal, was able to retain its influence and the royal court expressed confidence towards them, when Nicholas Kőszegi was elected Palatine, replacing Roland Rátót. Following this Roland served as ispán of Vas County in the summer of 1275. He also functioned as Master of the treasury for Elizabeth of Sicily, Queen of Hungary between 1275 and 1276. Beside that he was also the head of Szana County in Slavonia. In 1277, he served as Judge royal after exactly thirty years of his first term. In this capacity, he represented the Hungarian barons, when Ladislaus IV met Rudolf of Habsburg in Hainburg an der Donau on 11 November to confirm their alliance against Ottokar II of Bohemia. Roland Rátót died in that year or early 1278. He was mentioned as a deceased person in March 1278.

== Sources ==
- Gál, Judit (2020). Dalmatia and the Exercise of Royal Authority in the Árpád-Era Kingdom of Hungary. Arpadiana III., Research Centre for the Humanities. ISBN 978-963-416-227-8.
- Kristó, Gyula (1979). A feudális széttagolódás Magyarországon [Feudal Anarchy in Hungary] (in Hungarian). Akadémiai Kiadó. ISBN 963-05-1595-4.
- Markó, László (2006). A magyar állam főméltóságai Szent Istvántól napjainkig: Életrajzi Lexikon [Great Officers of State in Hungary from King Saint Stephen to Our Days: A Biographical Encyclopedia] (in Hungarian). Helikon Kiadó. ISBN 963-208-970-7.
- Rudolf, Veronika (2023). Közép-Európa a hosszú 13. században [Central Europe in the Long 13th Century] (in Hungarian). Arpadiana XV., Research Centre for the Humanities. ISBN 978-963-416-406-7.
- Szovák, Kornél (1989). "Rátót nembeli Rolánd nádor kúriája [The Curia of Palatine Roland of the Rátót Kindred]". In Somfai, Balázs (ed.). A Dunántúl településtörténete VII. Falvak, várak és puszták a Dunántúlon (XI–XIX. század) (in Hungarian). Hungarian Academy of Sciences. pp. 299–316. ISBN 963-7121-16-1.
- Szőcs, Tibor (2014). A nádori intézmény korai története, 1000–1342 [An Early History of the Palatinal Institution: 1000–1342] (in Hungarian). Magyar Tudományos Akadémia Támogatott Kutatások Irodája. ISBN 978-963-508-697-9.
- Szűcs, Jenő (2002). Az utolsó Árpádok [The Last Árpáds] (in Hungarian). Osiris Kiadó. ISBN 963-389-271-6.
- Zsoldos, Attila (2007). Családi ügy: IV. Béla és István ifjabb király viszálya az 1260-as években [A family affair: The Conflict between Béla IV and Junior King Stephen in the 1260s] (in Hungarian). História, MTA Történettudományi Intézete. ISBN 978-963-9627-15-4.
- Zsoldos, Attila (2011). Magyarország világi archontológiája, 1000–1301 [Secular Archontology of Hungary, 1000–1301] (in Hungarian). História, MTA Történettudományi Intézete. ISBN 978-963-9627-38-3.

Roland I Genus Rátót Born: c. 1215 Died: 1277 or 1278
Political offices
| Preceded by Lawrence | Master of the cupbearers 1241 | Succeeded by Maurice Pok |
| Preceded by Matthew Csák | Master of the stewards 1242–1246 | Succeeded by Maurice Pok |
| Preceded by Ladislaus Kán | Judge royal 1247 | Succeeded by Paul Geregye |
| Preceded by Denis Türje | Palatine of Hungary; 1248–1260 | Succeeded by Henry Kőszegi |
| Preceded by Stephen Gutkeled | Ban of Slavonia; 1260–1267 | Succeeded by Henry Kőszegi |
| Preceded by Lawrence, son of Kemény | Palatine of Hungary; 1272–1273 | Succeeded by Lawrence, son of Kemény |
| Preceded by Béla as Duke of Macsó | Ban of Macsó; 1272–1273 | Succeeded by Egidius Monoszló |
| Preceded by Lawrence, son of Kemény | Palatine of Hungary; 1273 | Succeeded by Denis Péc |
| Preceded by Denis Péc | Palatine of Hungary; 1274–1275 | Succeeded by Nicholas Kőszegi |
| Preceded by Denis Péc | Judge royal 1277 | Succeeded by Julius Rátót |
