= Stephen II Csák =

14th-century Hungarian nobleman

Stephen (II) Csák

Wildgrave of Bakony
- Reign: 1280
- Predecessor: Julius Rátót
- Successor: Demetrius Csák
- Native name: Stephen (II) Márk
- Died: between 1307 and 1309
- Noble family: gens Csák
- Issue: Mark II; Peter III; Stephen III a daughter
- Father: Mark I

Stephen (II) from the kindred Csák (Hungarian: Csák nembeli (II.) István; d. 1307/09) was a Hungarian noble who served as Wildgrave of Bakony in 1280.

== Biography ==
He was born into the Trencsén branch of the gens Csák as the second son of Mark I. He had a brother Peter II and two sisters; Maria, the wife of Ivánka Hont-Pázmány and an unidentified one, who married James Bána then Lőrinte II Lőrinte. His cousin was the oligarch Matthew III. Stephen had four children: Mark II; Peter III, who functioned as master of the horse between 1314 and 1317; Stephen III and a daughter, who married Roland III Rátót, son of palatine Roland II Rátót.

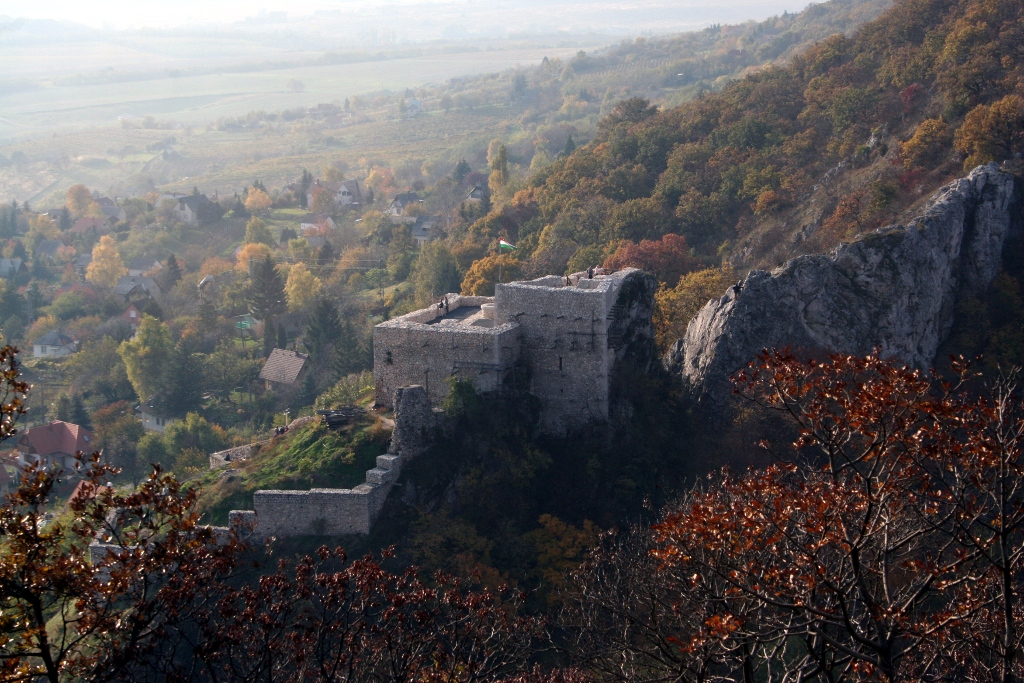
Remains of Csókakő Castle

According to Ottokar aus der Gaal's Steirische Reimchronik ("Styrian Rhyming Chronicle"), Stephen took part in the 1291 Austrian–Hungarian war. Stephen and his descendants remained landowners near the ancient estate of the genus, Csákvár, while his cousins, Matthew III and Csák acquired possessions in the north-western counties of the Kingdom of Hungary, where later Matthew III, as the most powerful oligarch, ruled de facto independently of the king and usurped royal prerogatives on his realm. Stephen also tried to establish a dominion independently of the central power, expanding his influence over the territories that surrounded his possessions and centre, the Csókakő Castle. His land acquisition methods were violent. Andrew III of Hungary called him a "powerful tyrant of the country" (Latin: fortissimus tirannus regni nostri) in 1295, when Stephen captured and imprisoned the members of the Süttői family from the kindred Szák in Esztergom County. In 1301, Henry, abbot of Bakonybél complained to the king that Stephen oppressed the whole of Veszprém County. Six years later the chapter of Esztergom protested against him because Stephen forcibly occupied Gyermely, Epöl and Dorog from the provost of the archdiocese for 20 years.

Stephen's economic interests were different from his cousins'. He acquired lands south of the Danube, while Matthew III and Csák built dominions north of the river. As a result, according to the genealogy, Stephen founded a Transdanubian side branch within the Trencsén branch. He owned Kobersdorf (Kabold), Sopron County as a royal gift – Stephen and his brother Peter were granted the fort by King Ladislaus IV of Hungary in 1280 –, Bátorkő and Csesznek castles in Veszprém County, Gesztes Castle in Komárom County and Bajót in Esztergom County. This territorial separation excluded a possible clash between Stephen and his cousins. The Csáks soon, however, were expelled by the Kőszegis from Sopron County; Stephen also lost Kabold sometime before 1289. Initially, the Csáks progressed politically in the same way; they turned against king Andrew III and joined the opposition to the Árpád dynasty. On 10 February 1300, Charles II of Naples listed all three of them among his grandson Charles Robert's supporters. In June 1300, the Bossányi brothers, Barlaus and Irizlaus attacked the Csák dominion by order of the king. Their army also plundered Stephen's possessions.

After the extinction of the Árpád dynasty with the death of Andrew III in 1301, the two branches of the kindred Csák became politically isolated from each other. During the emerging war of succession, Stephen supported Charles Robert, while Matthew III was a partisan of Wenceslaus III of Bohemia. In September 1302, Stephen led Charles' army to occupy Buda Castle, Wenceslaus' residence; however the siege ended in failure, the pro-Přemyslid lord Ivan Kőszegi successfully defended the capital. Thereafter, during their retreat, the troops of Roland Rátót and Stephen Csák unsuccessfully besieged Székesfehérvár in October 1302 too. In August 1304, Stephen was among the barons who signed the Treaty of Pressburg (Pozsony; today Bratislava, Slovakia) between Charles I and Rudolf III, Duke of Austria and Styria, against Wenceslaus. Stephen died between 1307 and 1309. His sons, Mark II and Peter III, attended the second coronation of Charles I on 15 June 1309, continuing their father's political orientation.

== Sources ==
- (in Hungarian) Kristó, Gyula (1986). Csák Máté ("Matthew Csák"). Magyar História, Gondolat. Budapest. ISBN 963-281-736-2
- Rudolf, Veronika (2023). Közép-Európa a hosszú 13. században [Central Europe in the Long 13th Century] (in Hungarian). Arpadiana XV., Research Centre for the Humanities. ISBN 978-963-416-406-7.
- (in Hungarian) Zsoldos, Attila (2011). Magyarország világi archontológiája, 1000–1301 ("Secular Archontology of Hungary, 1000–1301"). História, MTA Történettudományi Intézete. Budapest. ISBN 9789639627383

Stephen II Genus Csák Born: ? Died: between 1307 and 1309
Political offices
| Preceded by Julius Rátót | Wildgrave of Bakony; 1280 | Succeeded by Demetrius Csák |
