= Nicholas Rátót =

Hungarian nobleman

Nicholas (I) Rátót

Master of the cupbearers
- Reign: 1293–1296
- Predecessor: James Győr
- Successor: Mojs Ákos (?)
- Died: after 1308
- Noble family: gens Rátót
- Issue: Reynold Putnoki; Ladislaus I Putnoki; John I Putnoki
- Father: Oliver I

Nicholas (I) from the kindred Rátót ("Vecse"; Hungarian: Rátót nembeli (I.) "Vecse" Miklós; died after 1308) was a Hungarian nobleman at the turn of the 13th and 14th centuries, who served as Master of the cupbearers from 1293 to 1296. He was the forefather of the Putnoki noble family.

== Life and career ==
Nicholas I (also known by his nickname "Vecse") was born into the influential and prestigious gens (clan) Rátót, as the son of Oliver I (fl. 1255), himself a son of Dominic I, who was killed in the Battle of Mohi in 1241. Nicholas had two brothers, Reynold III and John, and an unidentified sister, who married powerful baron Reynold Básztély. Nicholas was the ancestor of the Putnoki family through his three sons, Reynold, Ladislaus and John ("the Deaf"). The kinship became extinct by the second half of the 15th century.

Nicholas first appeared in contemporary records in 1275. During the political crisis of 1280, King Ladislaus IV adopted new Cuman laws under the pressure of the Catholic Church. However, many Cumans decided to leave Hungary instead of obeying the papal legate Philip's demands. On their way to the frontier, they ravaged and looted many settlements and estates. Nicholas and his cousins, Roland II, Desiderius and Rathold II successfully defended the Cistercian monastery at Egres (present-day Igriș in Romania). Thereafter Nicholas and several other members of the Rátót clan participated in the royal military campaigns against the Cumans.

Along with the whole kindred, Nicholas was a staunch supporter of Andrew III. Nicholas participated in the royal campaign against Duke Albert of Austria in the summer of 1291. Two of his familiares were killed during the war. For his loyalty, he was made Master of the cupbearers in the summer of 1293. He served in this capacity until at least October 1296. In the latter occasion, he was also referred to as ispán of Szatmár County. Nicholas participated in the royal campaign of 1294, when Andrew III laid siege to the rebellious Roland Borsa's fort at Adorján (Adrian). During the campaign, Nicholas' two familiares were wounded. Nicholas was also present, when the Kőszegis rose up in open rebellion and the king declared war on the rebels in August 1296. During the campaign, Nicholas captured a certain Gregory, who was spying in the royal camp on behalf of Ivan Kőszegi. The spy was later sentenced to death and beheaded in Sopron.

Nicholas disappeared from the sources in the upcoming years, his political orientation during the Interregnum is unknown, but his kindred initially supported the claim of Wenceslaus from 1301, then Charles I from 1304. Nicholas was styled as "baron" (and was ranked to the upscale fourth place) in September 1308 by Charles, when the king restored the privileges and rights of the church of Buda.

== Sources ==
- Kristó, Gyula (1999). "I. Károly király főúri elitje (1301–1309) [The Aristocratic Elite of King Charles I, 1301–1309]". Századok (in Hungarian). 133 (1). Magyar Történelmi Társulat: 41–62. ISSN 0039-8098.
- Kristó, Gyula, ed. (2000). Középkori históriák oklevelekben (1002–1410) [Medieval Stories in Charters (1002–1410)] (in Hungarian). Szegedi Középkorász Műhely. ISBN 963-482-423-4.
- Zsoldos, Attila (2011). Magyarország világi archontológiája, 1000–1301 [Secular Archontology of Hungary, 1000–1301] (in Hungarian). História, MTA Történettudományi Intézete. ISBN 978-963-9627-38-3.

Nicholas I Genus Rátót Born: ? Died: after 1308
Political offices
Preceded by James Győr	Master of the cupbearers 1293–1296	Succeeded by Mojs Ákos (?)
