= Roland III Rátót =

Roland (III) Rátót

Ispán of Sopron and Vas
- Reign: 1333–1336
- Predecessor: Stephen Losonci
- Successor: Leustach Rátót
- Died: May/November 1336
- Noble family: gens Rátót
- Spouse: N Csák
- Father: Roland II

Roland (III) from the kindred Rátót (Hungarian: Rátót nembeli (III.) Roland; died May/November 1336) was a Hungarian nobleman in the 14th century, who served as ispán of Sopron and Vas counties from 1333 until his death, during the reign of Charles I of Hungary.

== Family and career ==
Roland III was born into the influential and prestigious gens (clan) Rátót, as the son of Roland II, who served as Palatine of Hungary at the turn of the 13th and 14th centuries. He had three brothers. The eldest one, Desiderius II was the ancestor of the Jolsvai (previously Gedei) noble family, which became extinct in 1427. His another brother Leustach IV succeeded Roland as ispán after his death. The third brother, Stephen III was mentioned only once in 1321. Roland III married an unidentified daughter of Stephen II Csák, a notable soldier and key supporter of Charles in the 1300s. They had no children.

The brothers first appear in contemporary records in 1321. Despite their father was an important confidant of Charles until his death in 1307, his sons Roland III and Leustach IV did not elevate into the group of barons. Roland III was first referred to as ispán of Sopron and Vas counties (which two dignities were combined since 1330) in November 1333. He owned the castle of Kőszeg as an "honor", while he held both offices. Roland was last mentioned as a living person in May 1336. He died by November in that year.

== Sources ==
- Engel, Pál (1996). Magyarország világi archontológiája, 1301–1457, I [Secular Archontology of Hungary, 1301–1457, Volume I] (in Hungarian). História, MTA Történettudományi Intézete. ISBN 963-8312-44-0.
- Kristó, Gyula (1999). "I. Károly király főúri elitje (1301–1309) [The Aristocratic Elite of King Charles I, 1301–1309]". Századok (in Hungarian). 133 (1). Magyar Történelmi Társulat: 41–62. ISSN 0039-8098.

Roland III Genus Rátót Born: ? Died: May/November 1336
Political offices
Preceded by Stephen Losonci	Ispán of Sopron and Vas; 1333–1336	Succeeded by Leustach Rátót
