= Zádor, Hungary =

Zádor
- Village (Falva)
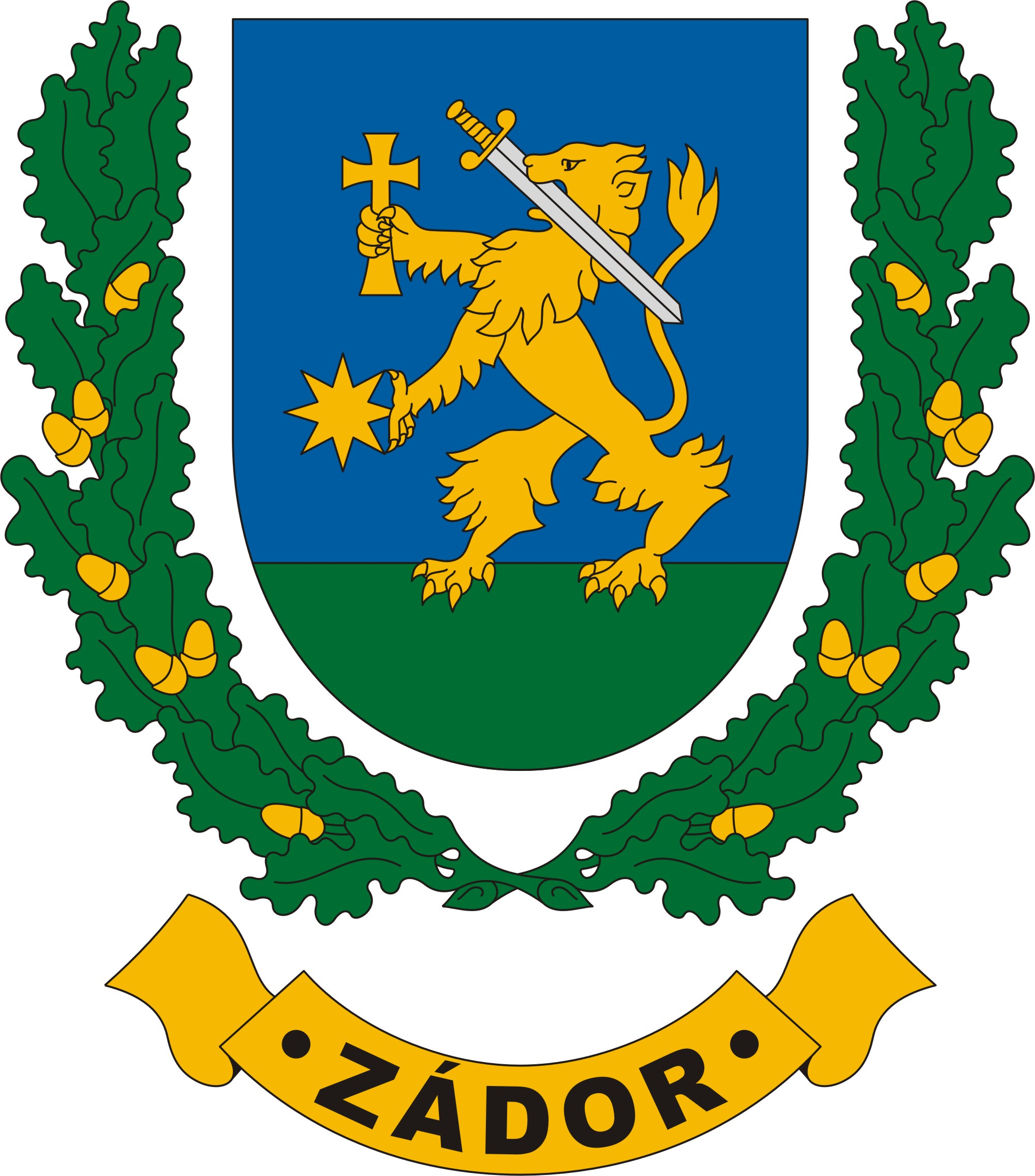
- Seal

- Location of Baranya county in Hungary

- Location of Zádor, Hungary
- Coordinates: 45.96226°N 17.65907°E
- Country: Hungary
- County: Baranya

Area
  - Total: 15.22 km^{2} (5.88 sq mi)

Population (2004)
  - Total: 390
  - Density: 25.62/km^{2} (66.4/sq mi)
- Time zone: UTC+1 (CET)
  - Summer (DST): UTC+2 (CEST)
- Postal code: 7976
- Area code: 73

Zádor is a village in Baranya county, Hungary. As of 2004, it had a population of approximately 390 residents and covers an area of 15.22 square kilometres.

== History ==
According to László Szita the settlement was completely Hungarian in the 18th century.

== Nearby attractions ==
While Zádor itself is a quiet rural settlement, there are several attractions in the surrounding area:

- Castle of Kapla: Situated in the village of Širkovce, this medieval castle ruin is nestled in hilly terrain and offers a glimpse into the region's history.
- Gemer-Malohont Museum: Located in Rimavská Sobota, about 17.7 km away, this is one of the oldest museums in Slovakia, housed in a historic building showcasing classicist architecture.
- Domica Cave: Approximately 26.3 km from Zádor, this is the largest cave in Slovakia, offering visitors a chance to explore its extensive underground passages.
