= Leustach IV Rátót =

Hungarian nobleman (died 1340)

Leustach (IV) Rátót

Ispán of Sopron and Vas
- Reign: 1336–1340
- Predecessor: Roland Rátót
- Successor: Stephen Lackfi
- Died: 1340
- Noble family: gens Rátót
- Father: Roland II

Leustach (IV) from the kindred Rátót (Hungarian: Rátót nembeli (IV.) Leusták; died 1340) was a Hungarian nobleman in the 14th century, who served as ispán of Somogy and Tolna counties from 1333, and Sopron and Vas counties from 1336 till his death, during the reign of Charles I of Hungary.

== Family and career ==
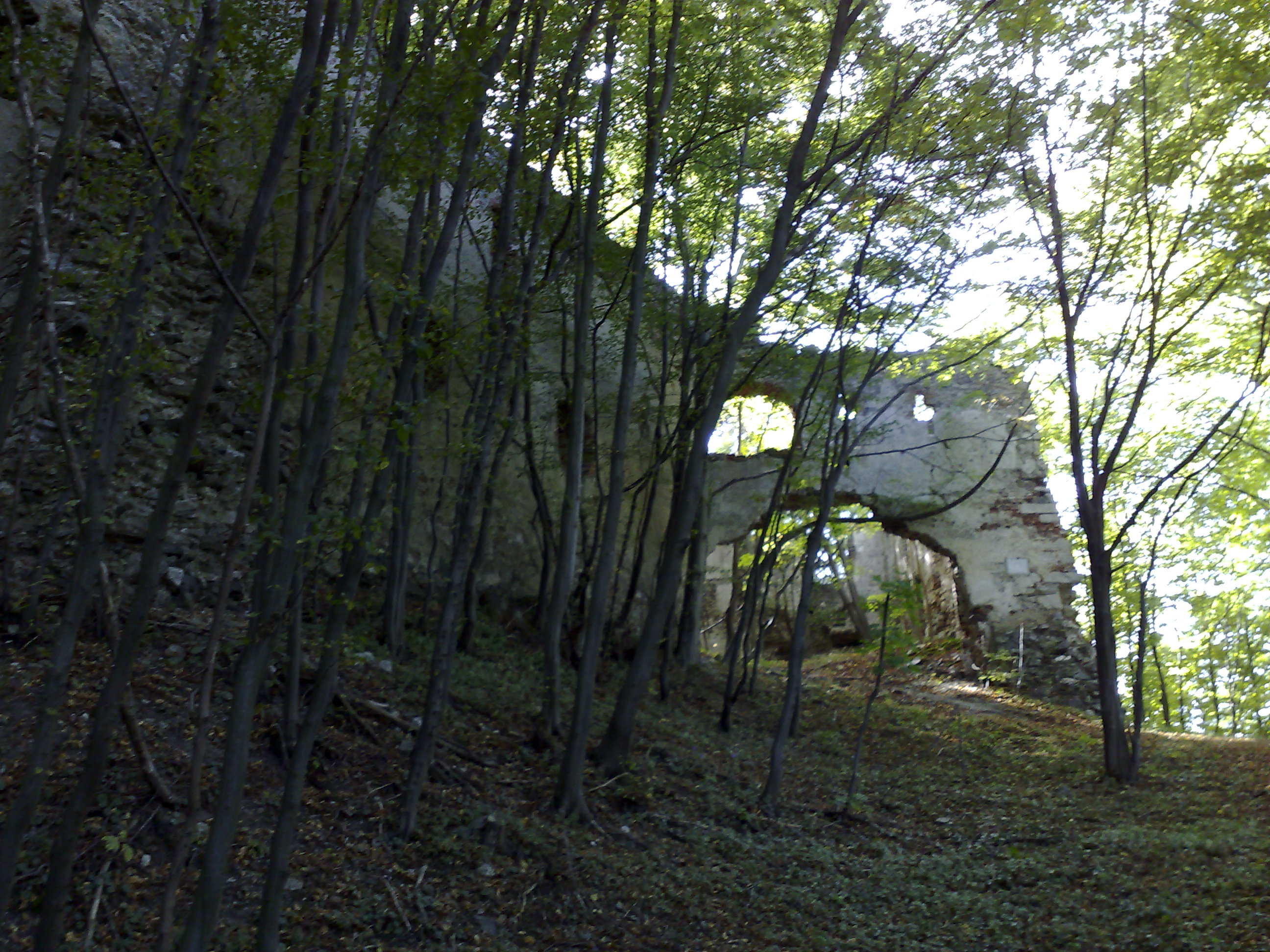
The ruins of Schwarzenbach Castle in Austria. Leustach Rátót served as its castellan in 1337, when the fort temporarily became part of Hungary for decades

Leustach IV was born into the influential and prestigious gens (clan) Rátót, as the son of Roland II, who served as Palatine of Hungary at the turn of the 13th and 14th centuries. He had three brothers. The eldest one, Desiderius II was the ancestor of the Jolsvai (previously Gedei) noble family, which became extinct in 1427. His another brother Roland III preceded him as ispán of two counties in Western Hungary. The third brother, Stephen III was mentioned only once in 1321.

The brothers first appear in contemporary records in 1321. Despite their father was an important confidant of Charles until his death in 1307, his sons Roland III and Leustach IV did not elevate into the group of barons. After Palatine John Drugeth left Hungary for Naples in 1333, Leustach was made ispán of Somogy and Tolna counties in that year. It is plausible that he held both offices without interrupt until his death, albeit his distant relative Oliver Paksi, also originated from the Rátót clan, was also styled as ispán of Somogy County by some contemporary documents in the summer of 1336.

Following the death of his brother Roland III in the second half of 1336, Leustach was appointed ispán of Sopron and Vas counties (which two dignities were combined since 1330) too. When Charles I finally defeated the Kőszegis, who made an alliance with the Dukes of Austria, he signed peace treaty with Albert and Otto of Austria, which was signed on 11 September 1337, forbade both the dukes and Charles to give shelter to the other party's rebellious subjects. In accordance with the treaty, the castle of Schwarzenbach came under Hungarian jurisdiction too. Leustach was styled as castellan of Schwarzenbach in a document issued on 4 October 1337.

== Sources ==
- Engel, Pál (1996). Magyarország világi archontológiája, 1301–1457, I [Secular Archontology of Hungary, 1301–1457, Volume I] (in Hungarian). História, MTA Történettudományi Intézete. ISBN 963-8312-44-0.
- Kristó, Gyula (1999). "I. Károly király főúri elitje (1301–1309) [The Aristocratic Elite of King Charles I, 1301–1309]". Századok (in Hungarian). 133 (1). Magyar Történelmi Társulat: 41–62. ISSN 0039-8098.

Leustach IV Genus Rátót Born: ? Died: 1340
Political offices
Preceded by John Drugeth	Ispán of Somogy; 1333–1340	Succeeded by Bartholomew Frankopan
Preceded by John Drugeth	Ispán of Tolna; 1333–1340	Succeeded by Stephen Kotromanić
Preceded by Roland Rátót	Ispán of Sopron and Vas; 1336–1340	Succeeded by Stephen Lackfi
