= Rátót (genus) =

Clan (gens) in the Kingdom of Hungary

Genus (gens) Rátót
- Country: Kingdom of Hungary
- Founded: 11th century
- Founder: Rathold and Oliver
- Cadet branches: Feled branch Paks branch Pásztó branch Putnok branch

Rátót (Ráthold or Rátold) was the name of a gens (Latin for "clan"; nemzetség in Hungarian) in the Kingdom of Hungary. According to Simon of Kéza and other chroniclers, the ancestors of the clan were Italians from Caserta, Naples, by name Rathold and Oliver, who settled down in Hungary around 1097 during the reign of Coloman, King of Hungary. They came to Hungary alongside Felicia of Sicily.

The Lorántffy, Kakas de Kaza, Feledi, Putnoki, Jolsvai, Kakas, Gyulaffy, Elefánti, Paksi, Pásztói, Kaplai, Ráday and Tari families were originated from the Genus Rátót.

The ancestors of the Rátold family came to Hungary from the town of Caserta in the province of Puglia, according to Simon Kézai and other chronicles following him. According to another opinion, Olivier and Reithold arrived in Hungary from Naples at the end of the 11th century, around 1079, during the time of Kálmán Könyves King of Hungary.[1]. Perhaps they came to Hungary alongside Felicia of Sicily.

The divergence of opinions about the origin of the Rátót genus is caused by the fact that Simon Kézai exchanged the place of origin of the Rátót genus (Swabia) with the Hontpázmány's (Apulia), and it is seldom possible to reach a stable conclusion from an erroneous starting point.

In József Csoma's „Magyar nemzetségi címerek” (Coat of Arms of Hungarian Genera) (Hungarian scientific Academy, Budapest, 1904), gets stuck in the fact that the chronicles derive the Ratholds from Apulia. The coat of arms of the Rátót genus was the linden leaf, which can also be found in the coats of arms of the families derived from it.

== Notable members ==
- Leustach I, voivode of Transylvania (1176–c. 1196)
- Rathold, ispán of Somogy County (1203)
- Julius, judge royal (1219–1221; 1235–1239), voivode of Transylvania (1229–1231)
- Baldwin, master of the cupbearers (1233–1234; 1235–1238; 1247–1254)
- Reynold, ispán of Veszprém County (1237–1238)
- Dominic, master of the treasury (1238–1240), killed in the Battle of Mohi
- Norbert, ispán of Veszprém County (1246–1247)
- Matthias, archbishop of Esztergom (1239–1241), killed in the Battle of Mohi
- Roland, palatine (1248–1260; 1272–1273; 1273; 1274–1275), judge royal (1246–1248; 1277), ban of Slavonia (1261–1267; 1277)
- "Porc" Stephen, master of the treasury (1273), founder of the "Palatine branch"
- Oliver I, ispán of Pilis County (1272)
- Baldwin, ispán of Zala County (1275–1276; 1276)
- Julius, master of the cupbearers (1275), judge royal (1278)
- Desiderius, ispán of Gömör (1290–1304) and Borsod Counties (1299–1308)
- Nicholas, master of the cupbearers (1293–1296)
- Ladislaus, ban of Slavonia (1300)
- Roland, palatine (1298–1299; 1303–1307)
- Kakas, ispán of Bodrog and Tolna Counties (1300), killed in the Battle of Rozgony
- Dominic, palatine (1314–1320)
- Roland III, ispán of Vas and Sopron Counties (1333–1336)
- Leustach IV, ispán of Vas and Sopron Counties (1336–1340)

== Family tree ==
- N
  - Leustach I (fl. 1200)
    - Rathold I (fl. 1203)
      - Dominic I (fl. 1238–41†)
        - Roland I (fl. 1241–77)
          - Matthias Paksi (fl. 1278–96) ∞ N Visontai
          - Rathold II (fl. 1278–96)
        - Stephen I ("Porc"; fl. 1265–77) ∞ Aglent Smaragd (fl. 1327)
          - Dominic II (fl. 1283–1320†)
            - Dominic Pásztói (fl. 1323–60)
            - Stephen IV (fl. 1323)
          - Lawrence (1282†)
          - Ladislaus I (fl. 1283–1328†)
            - Oliver II (fl. 1325–40)
              - Stephen V (fl. 1347–56; d. before 1360)
              - Margaret (fl. 1374) ∞ Michael Rimai
            - Stephen Tari (fl. 1325–47)
            - Anka (fl. 1325–28) ∞ Thepsen of Posega
          - Kakas (fl. 1290–1312†) ∞ N Visontai
            - John Kakas de Kaza (fl. 1325–66)
          - Leustach III ("Great"; fl. 1338–40; d. before 1348)
        - Oliver I (fl. 1255–72)
          - Reynold III (fl. 1275–83)
          - Nicholas I ("Vecse"; fl. 1275–1308)
            - Putnoki family
          - John (fl. 1282)
          - a daughter ∞ Reynold Básztély
        - Leustach II
          - Roland II (fl. 1275–1307†)
            - Desiderius II (fl. 1316–27)
              - Peter Jolsvai (fl. 1340–53) ∞ N Csetneki
            - Roland III (fl. 1321–36†)
            - Leustach IV (fl. 1321–40†)
            - Stephen III (fl. 1321)
          - Desiderius I ("Blind"; fl. 1275–1308) ∞ N Ákos
            - Benedict Kaplai (fl. 1322–26) ∞ Margaret Telegdi
              - Kaplai (or Serkei), then two branches: Lorántfi (Lorántffy) and Dezsőfi families
            - Ladislaus Feledi (fl. 1322–78)
            - Nicholas II (fl. 1326–58)
              - Ladislaus II (fl. 1361–71)
              - Elizabeth ∞ N
        - a daughter (d. before 1267) ∞ Maurice Pok
      - Baldwin I (fl. 1229–55)
        - Stephen II (d. before 1274)
        - Julius II (fl. 1274–79) ∞ Cunigunde Csák
          - Demetrius (fl. 1291–1300)
          - Julius III (fl. 1291–1315; d. before 1317) ∞ Clara, daughter of magistrate Werner (fl. 1323)
            - Chuta (fl. 1323) ∞ Gregory Domoszlói (fl. 1319–37)
        - Baldwin II (fl. 1275–83)
          - Lawrence Rátóti → Rátóti, then Gyulafi (Gyulaffy) family
      - (?) Matthias (fl. 1224–41†)
      - (?) Reynold I (fl. 1237–38)
      - (?) Norbert (fl. 1246–47)
    - Julius I (fl. 1214–39†)
  - N
    - Miske I (fl. 1222–27) ∞ Margaret (fl. 1258)
      - Abraham (fl. 1258–76)
      - Reynold II (fl. 1258–74)
        - Miske II (fl. 1299–1323)
          - Kővágóörsi, then Batthyány family (maternal branch)
      - Paul II (fl. 1276)
      - Gyöngy (fl. 1276) ∞ Barleus Baracs
    - Michael (fl. 1227)
    - Absa (fl. 1227)
      - Paul I (d. before 1272) ∞ Kela (fl. 1272)
        - a daughter ∞ Matthias Örsi (fl. 1272–99)

== Sources ==
- János Karácsonyi: A magyar nemzetségek a XIV. század közepéig. Budapest: Magyar Tudományos Akadémia. 1900–1901.
- Gyula Kristó (editor): Korai Magyar Történeti Lexikon – 9–14. század (Encyclopedia of the Early Hungarian History – 9–14th centuries); Akadémiai Kiadó, 1994, Budapest; ISBN 963-05-6722-9.
