= Čierny Potok =

Čierny Potok Feketepatak
- Municipality
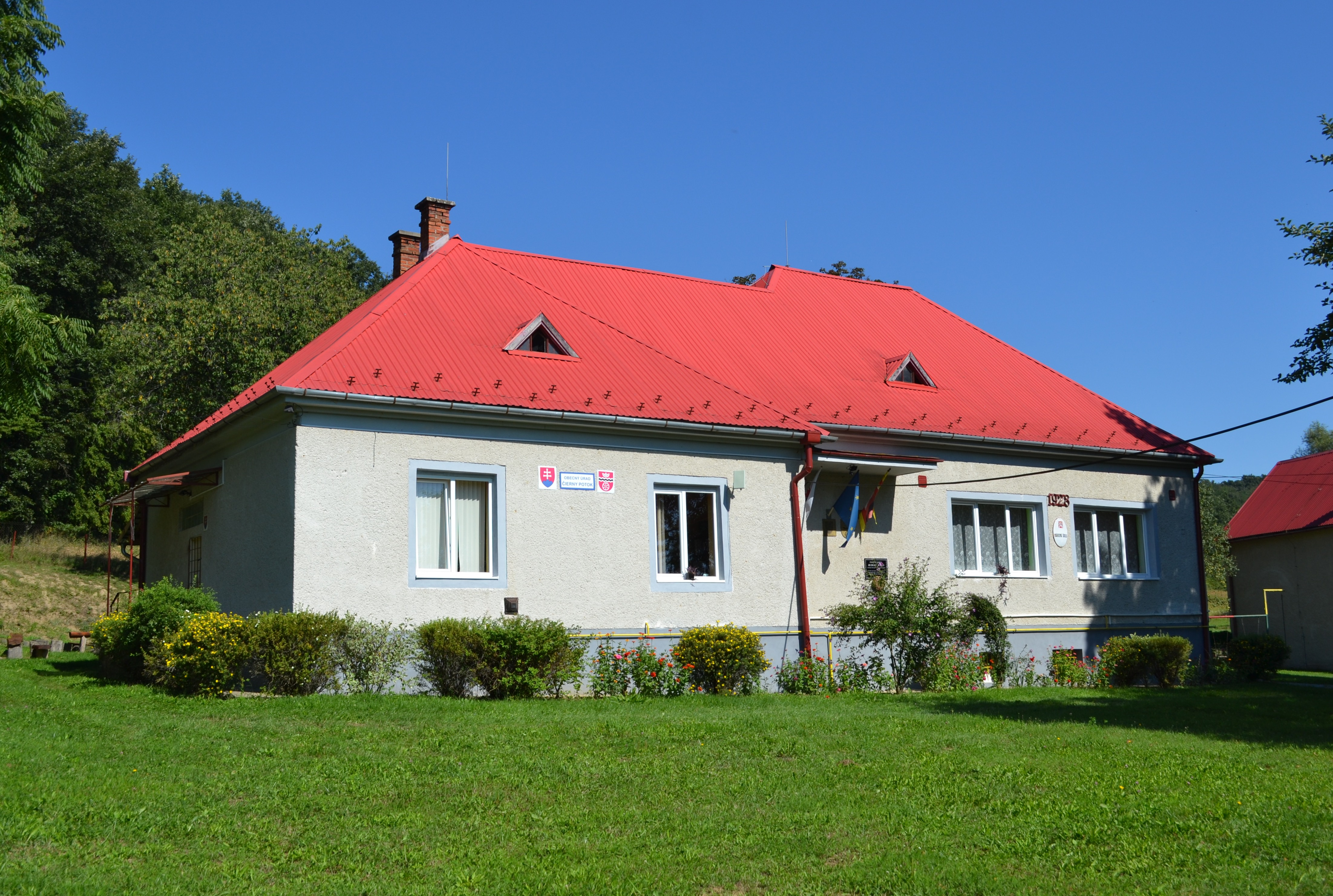
- Municipal Office

- Location of Čierny Potok in the Banská Bystrica Region Location of Čierny Potok in Slovakia
- Coordinates: 48.28°N 19.93°E
- Country: Slovakia
- Region: Banská Bystrica Region
- District: Rimavská Sobota District
- First mentioned: 1955

Area
  - Total: 5.90 km^{2} (2.28 sq mi)
- Elevation: 208 m (682 ft)

Population (2025)
  - Total: 117
- Time zone: UTC+1 (CET)
  - Summer (DST): UTC+2 (CEST)
- Postal code: 980 31
- Area code: +421 47
- Vehicle registration plate (until 2022): RS
- Website: www.ciernypotok.sk

Čierny Potok (Hungarian: Feketepatak) is a village and municipality in the Rimavská Sobota District of the Banská Bystrica Region of southern Slovakia.

== Geography ==
The municipality lies at an altitude of 208 metres (682 ft) and covers an area of 5.90 km^{2} (2.28 sq mi) (2025).

== History ==
The village arose in 1955 by separation from Hodejov. During Hungarian occupation in World War II, many inhabitants were deported to concentration camps.

== Population ==
Population statistic (10 years)
Year	1995	2005	2015	2025
Count	157	149	151	117
Difference		−5.09%	+1.34%	−22.51%

Population statistic
Year	2024	2025
Count	119	117
Difference		−1.68%

It has a population of 117 people (31 December 2025).

=== Ethnicity ===
Census 2021 (1+ %)
Ethnicity	Number	Fraction
Slovak	135	95.74%
Hungarian	5	3.54%
Total	141	

In year 2021 was 141 people by ethnicity 135 as Slovak, 5 as Hungarian, 1 as Czech, 1 as Ukrainian and 1 as Other.

Note on population: The difference values of population numbers in the table "Population statistic" and in the sections "Ethnicity" & "Religion" is caused by the use of various statistical methods.

=== Religion ===
Census 2021 (1+ %)
Religion	Number	Fraction
Roman Catholic Church	75	53.19%
None	55	39.01%
Evangelical Church	5	3.55%
Greek Catholic Church	3	2.13%
Total	141	

In year 2021 was 141 people by religion 75 from Roman Catholic Church, 55 from None, 5 from Evangelical Church, 3 from Greek Catholic Church, 1 from Calvinist Church, 1 from Eastern Orthodox Church and 1 from Czechoslovak Hussite Church.
