= Roland II Rátót =

Hungarian baron (died 1307)

Roland (II) Rátót
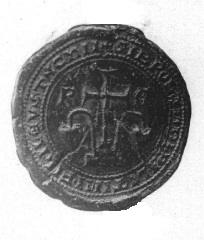
- Seal of Roland Rátót, 1299

Palatine of Hungary
- Reign: 1298–1299; 1303–1307
- Predecessor: Amadeus Aba & Nicholas Kőszegi (1st term) several office-holders (2nd term)
- Successor: Amadeus Aba (1st term) several office-holders (2nd term)
- Died: 1307
- Noble family: gens Rátót
- Issue: Desiderius II; Leustach IV; Roland III; Stephen III
- Father: Leustach II

Roland (II) from the kindred Rátót (Hungarian: Rátót nembeli (II.) Roland; died 1307) was a Hungarian baron at the turn of the 13th and 14th centuries. He was one of the seven barons in the early 14th century, who styled themselves Palatine of Hungary. He was the ancestor of the Jolsvai family.

== Family ==
Roland II was born into the influential and prestigious gens (clan) Rátót, as the son of magister Leustach II. His grandfather was Dominic I, who was killed in the Battle of Mohi in 1241. Roland II had a brother Desiderius I (also "the Blind"), who served as ispán of Borsod and Gömör Counties, and married a daughter of oligarch Stephen Ákos, establishing an alliance between the two powerful kindreds.

Roland had four sons from his unidentified wife. Through his eldest son, Desiderius II, he was the ancestor of the Jolsvai (previously Gedei) noble family, which became extinct in 1427. His two younger sons, Leustach IV and Roland III held various ispánates in the 1330s. Roland's fourth son, Stephen III was mentioned only once in 1321.

== Career ==
Roland first appeared in contemporary records in 1275. During the political crisis of 1280, King Ladislaus IV adopted new Cuman laws under the pressure of the Catholic Church. However, many Cumans decided to leave Hungary instead of obeying the papal legate Philip's demands. On their way to the frontier, they ravaged and looted many settlements and estates. Roland, his brother Desiderius and two of his cousins, Rathold II and Nicholas "Vecse" successfully defended the Cistercian monastery at Egres (present-day Igriș in Romania). Thereafter Roland and several other members of the Rátót clan participated in the royal military campaigns against the Cumans. Roland was present at the siege of Gede Castle (present-day Hodejov, Slovakia), where the rebellious Finta Aba barricaded himself in mid-1281. Later Roland himself owned the castle, but the date of acquisition is unknown. He also fought against the Cumans in the battle at Lake Hód (near present-day Hódmezővásárhely) in 1282.

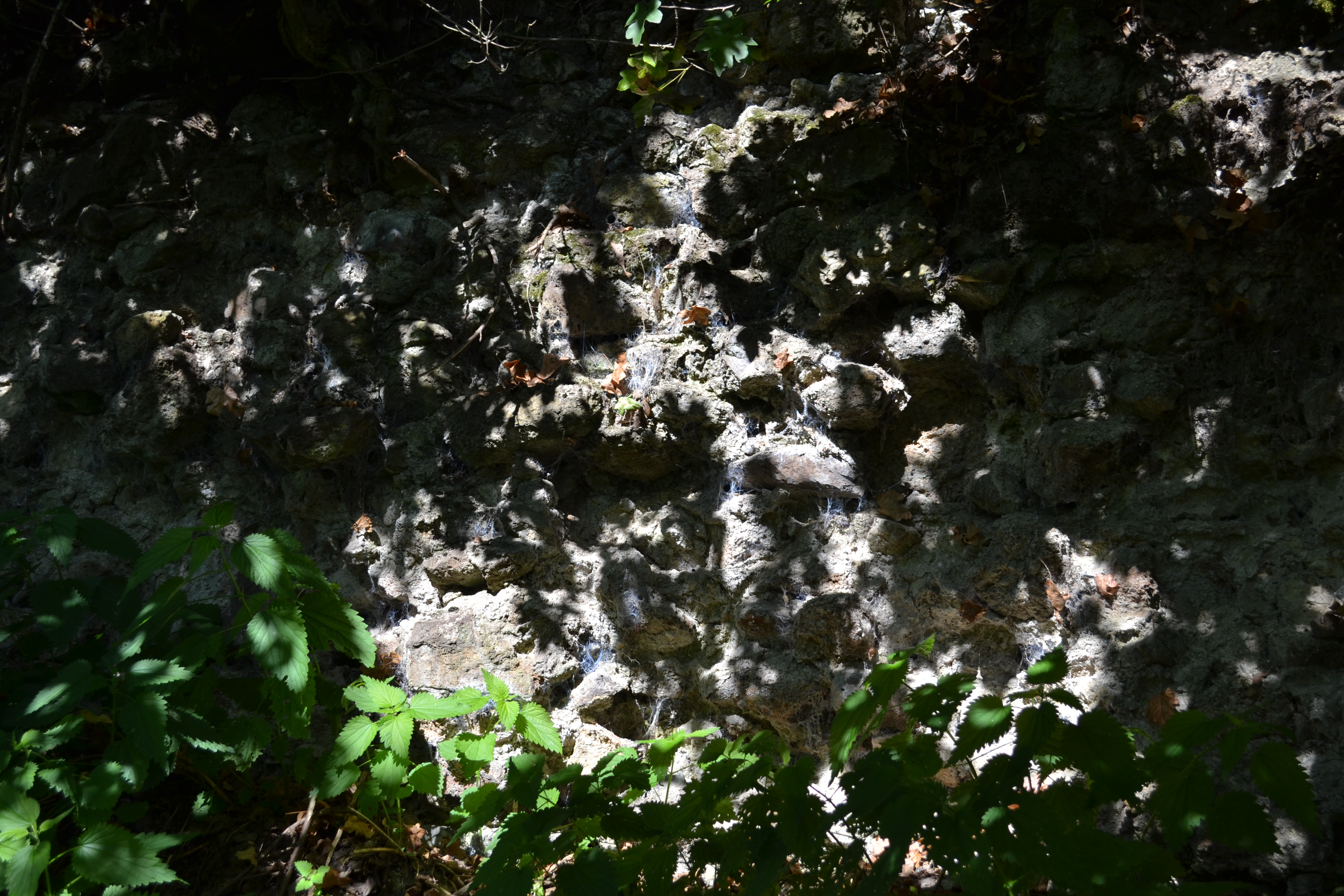
Remains of the stone wall of Gede Castle (present-day Hodejov in Slovakia), owned by Roland Rátót

For his military service, Roland was made Master of the horse by Ladislaus IV in 1283. It is possible he belonged to that baronial group, which was dominated by the gens Csák during that time. The alliance disintegrated by the following year with the deaths of brothers Matthew II and Peter I Csák. Thus Roland also lost his office. He was replaced by James Borsa, who was first mentioned in that capacity in August 1284.

Maintaining the short-lived dual system in the dignity in order to avoid power struggle, which characterized the late reign of Andrew III, Roland Rátót became Palatine of Hungary for the Transdanubian region (Latin: palatinus ultradanubialis) – simultaneously Apor Péc was responsible for Cisdanubia – in 1298 and held that office until the next year. In the contemporary context, this meant that Roland had jurisdiction over Eastern Hungary in this capacity (as "Transdanubia" had a different meaning than present days), while Apor Péc supervised the counties in Western Hungary. In addition, Roland also bore the title of Judge of the Cumans. Roland held an assembly at Gáva (today part of Gávavencsellő) in October 1298 and in Borsod County in the following year.

Following the death of Andrew III and the extinction of the Árpád dynasty in 1301, Roland presumably supported the claim of Wenceslaus of Bohemia to the Hungarian throne, similarly to his cousins (including Dominic II, the actual head of the family) and brother Desiderius. He attended the wedding of Stephen Ákos the Younger with a foreign (Bavarian or Czech) princess in early 1303, but this fact does not confirm his affiliation, as pro-Charles oligarch Amadeus Aba was also present. He was first referred to as "baron" in 1303. He took an oath of allegiance to Charles I by the next year. Within a short time, he rose to prominence in the royal court of Charles, becoming one of the most illustrious domestic partisans of the Anjou prince, alongside Ugrin Csák and Amadeus Aba.

Roland was styled as Palatine of Hungary since February 1303, he attended the aforementioned wedding in this capacity. In the first decade of the 14th century, seven barons held the dignity simultaneously. Majority of the historians, including Gyula Kristó and Jenő Szűcs, considered, these barons, Matthew III Csák, Amadeus Aba, Ivan Kőszegi, Stephen Ákos, James Borsa, Apor Péc and Roland Rátót himself were arbitrarily took and used the title, which marked its devaluation. However, historian Attila Zsoldos developed a special theory. When Andrew III formed a league against his enemies, a group of powerful lords — including the Kőszegis, Matthew Csák and Roland Borsa — urged Charles II of Naples to send his grandson, the 12-year-old Charles of Anjou, to Hungary in order to become king, according to the Illuminated Chronicle. The young prince disembarked in Split in August 1300, supported by most Croatian and Slavonian lords. However, the Kőszegis and Matthew Csák were shortly reconciled with Andrew, preventing Charles' success. Zsoldos argued Andrew III entered into a new feudal contract with the barons in the summer of 1300: Matthew Csák and Ivan Kőszegi became "perpetual" Palatines and Andrew accepted their suzerainty over their provinces, while the king's two most powerful partisans, Amadeus Aba and Stephen Ákos were also granted this privilege. In addition to them, two co-palatines of the previous year, Roland Rátót and Apor Péc also received the title as a counterweight, according to Zsoldos' theory. Therefore, the historian considers Roland already bore the dignity of Palatine since the last regnal year of Andrew. Accordingly, the claimants to the Hungarian throne inherited Andrew's last decision, and they were forced to accept the status quo. As Zsoldos emphasized the oligarchs recognized each other's titles, in addition to the monarchs, cathedral chapters and other institutions. One of the bases of Zsoldos' theory is the fact that Roland Rátót and Apor Péc were considered as much less important persons than, for instance Matthew Csák or Amadeus Aba. Still, other moderately influential lords did not follow the example of Apor and Roland, and nobody else were styled as palatine beyond two of them. In a royal document from 1307, Charles also referred to Roland as palatine, acknowledging his title.

Roland Rátót was present at the Diet of Rákos on 10 October 1307, which confirmed Charles' claim to the throne. He used the title of palatine there too. After Charles' third coronation, which was performed in full accordance with customary law, on 27 August 1310, the king recognized only James Borsa as Palatine, who was appointed to the position in 1306 by Charles. Roland Rátót was deceased by then, as he was never mentioned by contemporary documents after the diet in October 1307.

== Sources ==
- Engel, Pál (1996). Magyarország világi archontológiája, 1301–1457, I [Secular Archontology of Hungary, 1301–1457, Volume I] (in Hungarian). História, MTA Történettudományi Intézete. ISBN 963-8312-44-0.
- Kristó, Gyula (1999). "I. Károly király főúri elitje (1301–1309) [The Aristocratic Elite of King Charles I, 1301–1309]". Századok (in Hungarian). 133 (1). Magyar Történelmi Társulat: 41–62. ISSN 0039-8098.
- Markó, László (2006). A magyar állam főméltóságai Szent Istvántól napjainkig: Életrajzi Lexikon [Great Officers of State in Hungary from King Saint Stephen to Our Days: A Biographical Encyclopedia] (in Hungarian). Helikon Kiadó. ISBN 963-208-970-7.
- Szőcs, Tibor (2014). A nádori intézmény korai története, 1000–1342 [An Early History of the Palatinal Institution: 1000–1342] (in Hungarian). Magyar Tudományos Akadémia Támogatott Kutatások Irodája. ISBN 978-963-508-697-9.
- Zsoldos, Attila (2011a). Magyarország világi archontológiája, 1000–1301 [Secular Archontology of Hungary, 1000–1301] (in Hungarian). História, MTA Történettudományi Intézete. ISBN 978-963-9627-38-3.
- Zsoldos, Attila (2011b). "III. András hat nádora [The Six Palatines of Andrew III]". In Cabello, Juan; C. Tóth, Norbert (eds.). Erősségénél fogva várépítésre való: Tanulmányok a 70 éves Németh Péter tiszteletére [It is Very Well Placed for a Castle: Studies for the 70-year-old Péter Németh] (in Hungarian). Szabolcs-Szatmár-Bereg Megyei Önkormányzat Múzeumok Igazgatósága. pp. 289–299. ISBN 978-963-7220-75-3.

Roland II Genus Rátót Born: ? Died: 1307
Political offices
Preceded by Apor Péc	Master of the horse 1283	Succeeded by James Borsa
Preceded by Amadeus Aba & Nicholas Kőszegi	Palatine of Hungary alongside Apor Péc; 1298–1299	Succeeded by Amadeus Aba
Preceded by several office-holders	Palatine of Hungary alongside others 1303–1307	Succeeded by several office-holders
