= Oliver Rátót =

13C Hungarian nobleman

Oliver (I) Rátót

Ispán of Pilis
- Reign: 1272
- Predecessor: Philip
- Successor: Joachim Gutkeled
- Died: after 1272
- Noble family: gens Rátót
- Issue: Reynold III; Nicholas I John a daughter
- Father: Dominic I

Oliver (I) from the kindred Rátót (Hungarian: Rátót nembeli (I.) Olivér; died after 1272) was a Hungarian nobleman in the 13th century.

== Biography ==
Oliver was born into the prestigious and influential gens (clan) Rátót, as the son of Dominic I, who was killed in the Battle of Mohi in 1241. Oliver had three brothers, Roland I, Stephen I and Leustach II, and a sister, who married Maurice Pok. Oliver had four children from his unidentified wife: Reynold III, Nicholas "Vecse" – ancestor of the Putnoki family –, John and a daughter, who married powerful baron Reynold Básztély.

Alongside his elder brothers, Oliver was a confidant of Béla IV of Hungary. He served as treasurer of Queen Maria Laskarina's court from 1262 to 1268, but it is plausible he held the dignity until 1270, Béla's death. Beside that, he was also referred to as ispán of Gerzence (Garešnica) in 1262, a border ispánate which laid in the territory of Križevci County. Despite he supported Béla IV in the civil war against his son Duke Stephen, Oliver retained his positions in the royal court, when the latter ascended the Hungarian throne in 1270. Oliver was styled as ispán of Pilis County in 1272. He lost the office still in that year, and was ousted from politics thereafter, when rivaling baronial groups fought each other for the supreme power during the minority of Ladislaus IV of Hungary.

== Sources ==
- Zsoldos, Attila (2005). Az Árpádok és asszonyaik. A királynéi intézmény az Árpádok korában [The Árpáds and their Women: The Institution of Queenship in the Era of the Árpáds] (in Hungarian). MTA Történettudományi Intézete. ISBN 963-8312-98-X.
- Zsoldos, Attila (2011). Magyarország világi archontológiája, 1000–1301 [Secular Archontology of Hungary, 1000–1301] (in Hungarian). História, MTA Történettudományi Intézete. ISBN 978-963-9627-38-3.

Oliver I Genus Rátót Born: ? Died: after 1272
Political offices
Preceded by Philip	Ispán of Pilis; 1272	Succeeded by Joachim Gutkeled
