= Julius II Rátót =

Hungarian nobleman (1200s CE)

Julius (II) Rátót

Judge royal
- Reign: March 1278 – 19 June 1278
- Predecessor: Roland Rátót
- Successor: Stephen Gutkeled
- Born: Unknown
- Died: after 1279
- Noble family: gens Rátót
- Spouse: Kunigunda Csák
- Issue: Demetrius; Julius III
- Father: Baldwin I

Julius (II) from the kindred Rátót (Hungarian: Rátót nembeli (II.) Gyula; died after 1279) was a Hungarian distinguished nobleman from the gens Rátót as the son of Baldwin I, master of the cupbearers three times. Julius II married Kunigunda from the kindred Csák. They had two children, Demetrius and Julius III. The latter's daughter, Chuta was the last member of Baldwin's branch.

Julius II appeared in the contemporary records since 1274. He served as master of the cupbearers in 1275. He was appointed judge royal in 1278, at the beginning of the reign of Ladislaus IV of Hungary. Julius replaced his cousin, Roland I Rátót in that position. After that he functioned as Wildgrave of Bakony in 1279. His predecessor Csák from the kindred Csák was mentioned as "perpetuus comes de Bokon" (perpetual ispán) in 1270, thus Julius II might be the court ispán (curialis comes) i. e. judge royal (later iudex curie) in 1279 too. However, Julius was the husband of Kunigunda Csák; thus, he also belonged to the Csák clan.

== Sources ==
- (in Hungarian) Markó, László (2006). A magyar állam főméltóságai Szent Istvántól napjainkig – Életrajzi Lexikon ("The High Officers of the Hungarian State from Saint Stephen to the Present Days – A Biographical Encyclopedia") (2nd edition); Helikon Kiadó Kft., Budapest; ISBN 963-547-085-1.
- (in Hungarian) Zsoldos, Attila (2011). Magyarország világi archontológiája, 1000–1301 ("Secular Archontology of Hungary, 1000–1301"). História, MTA Történettudományi Intézete. Budapest. ISBN 978-963-9627-38-3

Julius II Genus Rátót Born: ? Died: after 1279
Political offices
Preceded by Peter	Master of the cupbearers 1275	Succeeded by Jakó Kaplon
Preceded by Roland Rátót	Judge royal 1278	Succeeded by Stephen Gutkeled
Preceded by Csák Csák	Wildgrave of Bakony; 1279	Succeeded by Stephen Csák
