= Castle of Kapla =

Coordinates: 48.2844°N 20.0714°E

Kapla Castle is a ruined medieval castle located near the village of Širkovce in southern Slovakia. Built in the 13th century, it played a role in the regional defense system during the Middle Ages.

== History ==
Archaeological research indicates that Kapla Castle was constructed in the 13th century. In the 14th century, King Charles I of Hungary granted the castle to a knight named Roland, the founder of the Lórántffy family. During the mid-15th century, the castle was occupied by the post-Hussite armed group known as the bratrzyks. In 1460, King Matthias Corvinus recaptured the castle and returned it to its previous owners. The castle was likely abandoned by the end of the 15th century.

== Architecture ==
The upper core of Kapla Castle measured approximately 55 by 20 meters and included a two-bay residential building on the eastern side and another structure on the western side of the courtyard. A rainwater tank about two meters wide was situated nearby. The castle's upper section occupied the highest part of the hill and may have been protected by an external wall on the western side. A slightly lower fortified outer ward, measuring about 20 by 30 meters, was located to the west, featuring additional buildings likely used for economic purposes and a gate on the northeast side. At the foot of the hill, there was probably an external belt of fortifications composed of both stone and wood-earth structures.

== Current state ==
Today, Kapla Castle remains in ruins, with the site overgrown by trees and shrubs. It takes approximately 25 minutes to reach the location from the village of Širkovce
