= Ugod =

- Location of Ugod
- Coordinates: 47.32352°N 17.59939°E
- Country: Hungary
- County: Veszprém

Area
  - Total: 62.79 km^{2} (24.24 sq mi)

Population (2002)
  - Total: 1,660
  - Density: 24.34/km^{2} (63.0/sq mi)
- Time zone: UTC+1 (CET)
  - Summer (DST): UTC+2 (CEST)
- Postal code: 8564
- Area code: 89
- Website: http://www.ugod.hu

Ugod is a small village in the North-Western part of Hungary, in Veszprém county, near Mount Bakony and close to Lake Balaton, at the juncture of Bakony and Little Alföld. The town is a great starting point for hikers, hunters and the lovers of countryside.

Distances: Budapest (150 km), Győr (60 km), Lake Balaton (80 km), Veszprém (60 km), Pápa (15 km).

== History ==
The first written mention of the village was in 1289. King László IV dated a charter during a campaign in this year. It is supposed that the Fortress of Ugod still existed at that time, but it is doubtful because the charter said "in Ugod" instead of "in Ugod fortress" or "under Ugod fortress" as was customary at that time.

During the Árpád Dynasty, Ugod was part of Bakony Erdőispánság. Ispán was the ruler of the territory. King Stephen V signed Csák Lukács's son Demeter and his posteriors to be forever ispán of that territory and allowed him to build a fortress.

The Csák family was related to the Árpád Dynasty. Their origin is from the Honfoglalás (settlement of the Magyars). Due to Anonymus and Képes Krónika, Csák was the son of Chief Előd's great-grandchild Szabolcs. The Csák family originated from that. They eventually had twelve branches, and one of them was called Ugodi. That branch's earliest known member was Csák Lukács. In this family, the name Ugrin (meaning Hungarian man) was very popular. One form of that name with diminutive -d is Ugod.

That was the name of Demeter's son or grandson, and the village was named after him.

Jews lived in the village in the 19th and 20th centuries, dozens of whom were murdered in the Holocaust.

== Sights ==
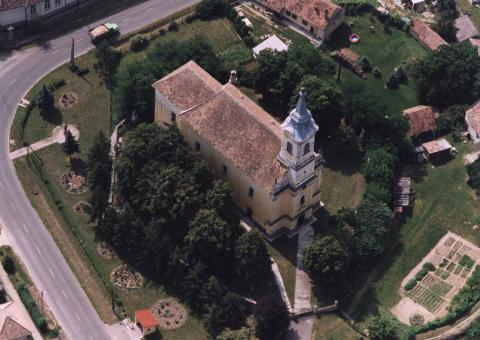

- Roman Catholic church (former fortress)
- Parish
- Pieta in front of parish
- Chalk-smelters around the village
- Ugod Lake
- Stephen I's statue
- Hubertlak in the surrounding forest
