= James Borsa =

James Borsa the Bald

Palatine of Hungary
- Reign: 1306–1314 (alone since 1310)
- Predecessor: several office-holders
- Successor: Dominic Rátót
- Born: c. 1260
- Died: 1325/1332
- Noble family: gens Borsa
- Issue: Bekcs a daughter
- Father: Thomas Borsa

The oligarchic provinces in the early 14th century

James Borsa the Bald (Hungarian: Borsa Kopasz Jakab; c. 1260 – 1325/1332), was an influential lord in the Kingdom of Hungary at the turn of the 13th and 14th centuries. He was Palatine between 1306 and 1314, Ban of Slavonia in 1298, and Master of the horse between 1284 and 1285.

== Sources ==
- Bárány, Attila (2011). "Debreceni Dózsa küzdelme a bihari oligarchákkal [Dózsa Debreceni's Struggle with Oligarchs in Bihar]". In Bárány, Attila; Papp, Klára; Szálkai, Tamás (eds.). Debrecen város 650 éves. Várostörténeti tanulmányok (in Hungarian). Debreceni Egyetem. Történelmi Intézet. pp. 75–126. ISBN 978-963-821-6465.
- Engel, Pál (1996). Magyarország világi archontológiája, 1301–1457, I [Secular Archontology of Hungary, 1301–1457, Volume I] (in Hungarian). História, MTA Történettudományi Intézete. ISBN 963-8312-44-0.
- Engel, Pál (2001). The Realm of St Stephen: A History of Medieval Hungary, 895–1526. I.B. Tauris Publishers. ISBN 1-86064-061-3.
- Markó, László (2006). A magyar állam főméltóságai Szent Istvántól napjainkig: Életrajzi Lexikon [Great Officers of State in Hungary from King Saint Stephen to Our Days: A Biographical Encyclopedia] (in Hungarian). Helikon Kiadó. ISBN 963-547-085-1.
- Zsoldos, Attila (2011). Magyarország világi archontológiája, 1000–1301 [Secular Archontology of Hungary, 1000–1301] (in Hungarian). História, MTA Történettudományi Intézete. ISBN 978-963-9627-38-3.

James the Bald Genus Borsa Born: c. 1260 Died: 1325/1332
Political offices
Preceded by Roland Rátót	Master of the horse 1284–1285	Succeeded by John Csák (?)
Preceded by Radoslav Babonić	Ban of Slavonia; 1298	Succeeded by Stephen Babonić
Preceded by several office-holders	Palatine of Hungary alongside others until 1310; 1306–1314	Succeeded by Dominic Rátót
