= County of the Bakony =

Royal land in the Kingdom of Hungary

The county of the Bakony (Hungarian: bakonyi erdőispánság) was a royal land in the Kingdom of Hungary in the Bakony forest formed in the 12th century. Originally it had no castles or significant population, neither were there bigger donations. In the 15th century it merged into Veszprém county.

== Sources ==
- Kristó, Gyula (1994). "Bakony 2.". In Kristó, Gyula; Engel, Pál; Makk, Ferenc (eds.). Korai magyar történeti lexikon (9–14. század) [Encyclopedia of the Early Hungarian History (9th–14th centuries)] (in Hungarian). Akadémiai Kiadó. p. 77. ISBN 963-05-6722-9.
