= Dominic I Rátót =

Hungarian noble

Dominic (I) Rátót

Master of the treasury
- Reign: 1238–1240
- Predecessor: Pous Csák
- Successor: Matthew Csák
- Born: Unknown
- Died: 11 April 1241; Muhi, Kingdom of Hungary
- Noble family: gens Rátót
- Issue: Roland I Stephen I a daughter Oliver I Leustach II
- Father: Rathold

Dominic (I) from the kindred Rátót (Hungarian: Rátót nembeli (I.) Domokos; died 11 April 1241) was a Hungarian distinguished nobleman from the gens Rátót, who served as master of the treasury between 1238 and 1240. His father was Rathold Rátót, ispán (comes) of Somogy County in 1203. His younger brother was Baldwin I Rátót. Dominic I had four sons and a daughter (spouse of Maurice II Pok).

He also functioned as ispán of Nyitra (1238) and Bihar Counties (1240). He was killed in the Battle of Mohi on 11 April 1241.

== Sources ==
- (in Hungarian) Markó, László (2006). A magyar állam főméltóságai Szent Istvántól napjainkig – Életrajzi Lexikon ("The High Officers of the Hungarian State from Saint Stephen to the Present Days – A Biographical Encyclopedia") (2nd edition); Helikon Kiadó Kft., Budapest; ISBN 963-547-085-1.
- (in Hungarian) Zsoldos, Attila (2011). Magyarország világi archontológiája, 1000–1301 ("Secular Archontology of Hungary, 1000–1301"). História, MTA Történettudományi Intézete. Budapest. ISBN 978-963-9627-38-3

Dominic I Genus Rátót Born: ? Died: 11 April 1241
Political offices
Preceded by Pous Csák	Master of the treasury 1238–1240	Succeeded by Matthew Csák
