= Egres Abbey =

Monastery in the Kingdom of Hungary

- Abația Igriș
- Interactive map of Egres Abbey

Monastery information
- Order: Cistercians
- Denomination: Roman Catholic
- Established: 1179
- Disestablished: 1514
- Mother house: Pontigny Abbey
- Dedication: Saint Mary

People
- Founder: Béla III of Hungary

Architecture
- Status: Destroyed
- Completion date: 1187

Site
- Location: Igriș, Timiș County
- Country: Romania
- Coordinates: 46°7′23″N 20°44′20″E

Egres Abbey (Hungarian: Egresi apátság; German: Kloster Egresch; Romanian: Abația Igriș; French: Abbaye d'Hégerieux) was a Cistercian monastery in the Kingdom of Hungary, located in Egres (present-day Igriș, part of the commune of Sânpetru Mare, Timiș County, Romania). The Egres Abbey was founded by Béla III of Hungary in 1179 as a filial abbey of Pontigny. Here is attested the oldest library in the territory of present-day Romania.

== History ==
=== Foundation ===
It was founded by King Béla III of Hungary, who gave it to the Cistercian abbot of Pontigny and his 12 fellow monks in 1179. Its building was completed in 1187. Five Cistercian monasteries are linked to the name of Béla III, the one at Egres being the second built, after Cikádor (Hungary) in 1142. The monastery dedicated to the Virgin Mary was deeply involved in church life in the diocese of Csanád, but also in patrimonial issues of some churches and monasteries in the neighboring areas.

The abbey complex was vast and included the library, the monks' cells, the granary, workshops, the mechanical mill and others.

=== Filial abbeys ===
In 1209, the monks of Egres founded their own filial abbey, Cârța Abbey, in Țara Făgărașului, near Sibiu. Another one was founded in 1266, in the Principality of Halych, namely the S. Crucis Galitiae Abbey. From 1214, for a century, the Vérteskeresztúr Abbey in Hungary was a filial of the Egres Abbey too.

=== Under Andrew II of Hungary ===
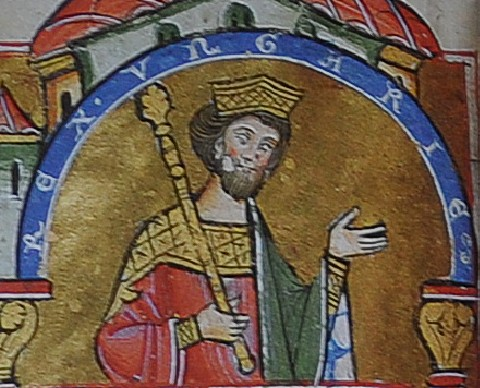
Andrew II of Hungary was buried in the abbey.

The monastery reached its peak during the reign of Andrew II, son of King Béla III. Probably through Yolanda's intercession, Andrew II got close to the Cistercian community of Egres and offered them, starting in 1224, plentiful royal donations. Also in 1224, Pope Honorius III requested royal protection over the Egres Abbey, which was frequently attacked during that period. The monastery also played an important role within Andrew II's policy of Christianizing the Cumans. Andrew II was the only Central European sovereign who initiated a crusade, started in 1217. His reign is also linked to the publication of the Golden Bull, in 1222. Andrew II and Yolanda of Courtenay were buried inside the monastery.

=== Decline ===
In 1241, with the great Mongol invasion, the monastic settlement at Egres, surrounded by fortified walls, was besieged and destroyed, and the church and royal tombs were desecrated. The destruction of the monastery was described by the Italian monk Rogerius, canon of the diocese of Nagyvárad, taken prisoner by the Mongols during the siege. The great Mongol invasion forced many families from the surrounding villages to take refuge in the abbey, but the invaders massacred the entire population.

After the Mongol invasion, King Béla IV returned to the country and began the reconstruction of the regions deserted by the nomads. The Egres Abbey was also repaired, but the works did not have the scale of a complete reconstruction. It was again besieged during the Cuman revolt of 1280, because the royal treasury was kept here. After the intervention of the royal functionary Andreas Bölényfő, the monastery was successfully defended. At the beginning of the 14th century, the monastery still played an important role in the religious life of the kingdom. Thus, in 1309, on the occasion of the election of the bishop of Transylvania, the abbot of Egres supported Benedict, the abbot of the Benedictine order, in winning the title of bishop.

Towards the second half of the 14th century, the Egres Abbey had lost its former importance. By 1357 it had only six monks. Abbot Martin of Egres, in a letter addressed to the pope on 8 November 1499, showed the decline and material lacks of the monastery.

=== Destruction ===
Starting with 1500, its properties were merged with the diocese of Csanád. Then, Vladislaus II, with the permission of the Parliament and the Pope, gave the abbey and the surrounding lands to Bishop Miklós Csáky. One last abbot of the monastery was mentioned in a document in 1527. In 1541, the abbey was just a military observation point where Peter Petrovics, the commander of Temes County, repaired the walls and set up a garrison.

On 28 September 1551, with the conquest of Cenad, Beylerbey Mehmet also besieged and destroyed the Egres fortification. Because of the danger represented by the potential Ottoman conquest, the local population chose to leave the village and take refuge in other regions of the kingdom.

The abbey would have been located on the site of today's Orthodox church in the village. A 1.5-meter piece of wall, numerous boulders and polished stones with a diameter of 1 meter are still preserved from the old abbey. With materials from the monastery, the locals built their houses or fences. There are also pieces from the abbey in the stairs of the Greek Catholic church in Igriș.

== Library ==
In the library of the abbey there were works by classical authors from Antiquity, such as Cicero, Seneca, Suetonius and Quintilian, but also books by medieval authors, including Gregory of Nazianzus, Anselm of Canterbury and Ivo of Chartres.

== Archeological discoveries ==
In 1870, archeological excavations were carried out that identified the ruins of the church along a length of 500 feet, traces of walls, pillars and architectural fragments from the vaults of the nave. The crypt of Andrew II, a rectangular brick construction, was discovered by a team of Romanian-Hungarian archeologists in 2019.
