= Širkovce =

Municipality of Slovakia

Širkovce Serke
- Municipality
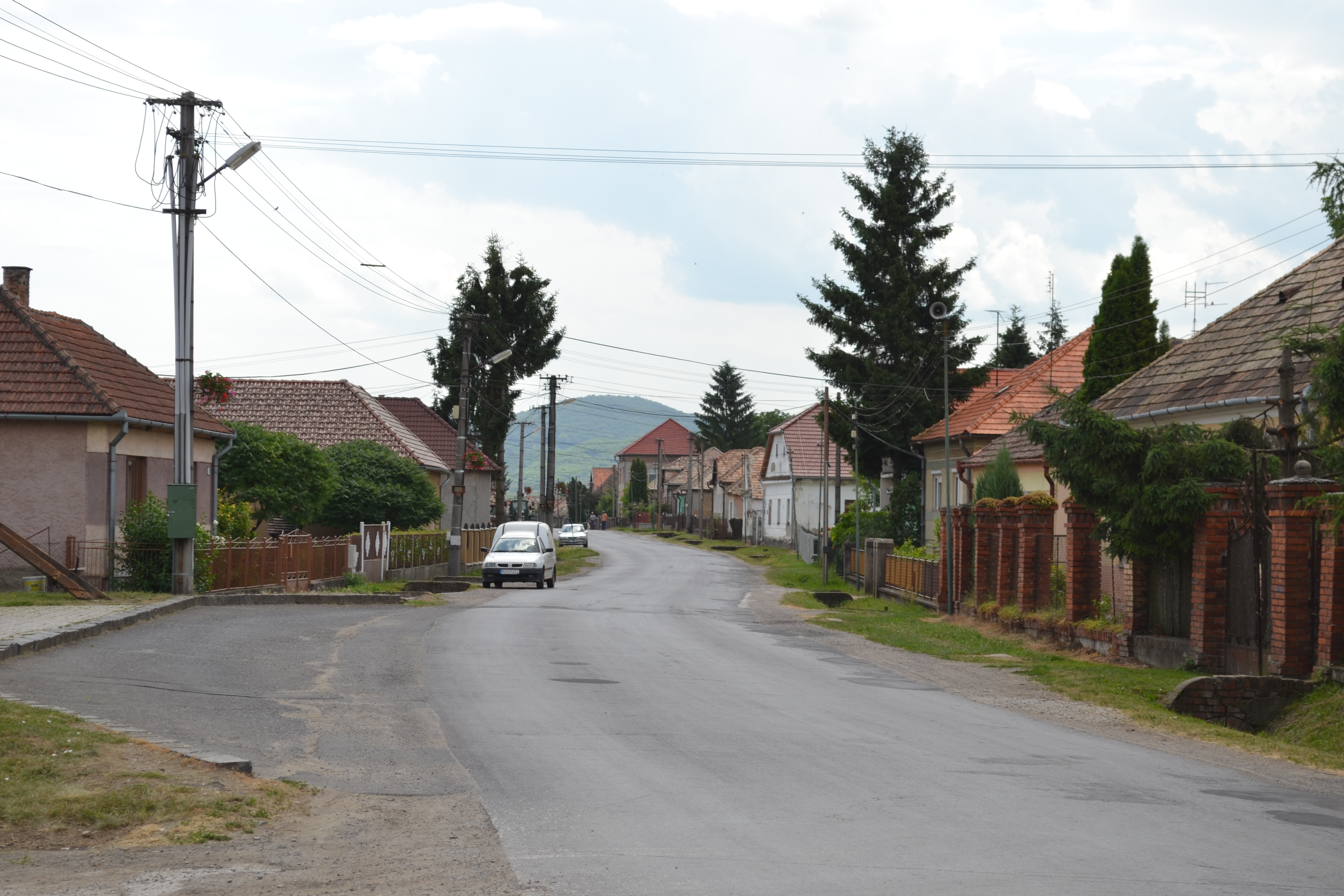

- Flag

- Location of Širkovce in the Banská Bystrica Region Location of Širkovce in Slovakia
- Coordinates: 48.28°N 20.08°E
- Country: Slovakia
- Region: Banská Bystrica Region
- District: Rimavská Sobota District
- First mentioned: 1264

Area
  - Total: 17.71 km^{2} (6.84 sq mi)
- Elevation: 183 m (600 ft)

Population (2025)
  - Total: 949
- Time zone: UTC+1 (CET)
  - Summer (DST): UTC+2 (CEST)
- Postal code: 980 02
- Area code: +421 47
- Vehicle registration plate (until 2022): RS
- Website: www.gemernet.sk/sirkovce/

Širkovce (Hungarian: Serke) is a village and municipality in the Rimavská Sobota District of the Banská Bystrica Region of southern Slovakia.

== Geography ==
The municipality lies at an altitude of 183 metres (600 ft) and covers an area of 17.71 km^{2} (6.84 sq mi) (2025).

== Population ==
Population statistic (10 years)
Year	1995	2005	2015	2025
Count	776	899	974	949
Difference		+15.85%	+8.34%	−2.56%

Population statistic
Year	2024	2025
Count	963	949
Difference		−1.45%

It has a population of 949 people (31 December 2025).

=== Ethnicity ===
Census 2021 (1+ %)
Ethnicity	Number	Fraction
Hungarian	847	88.5%
Romani	367	38.34%
Slovak	93	9.71%
Not found out	40	4.17%
Total	957	

In year 2021 was 957 people by ethnicity 847 as Hungarian, 367 as Romani, 93 as Slovak, 40 as Not found out, 2 as Czech, 1 as Rusyn and 1 as Other.

Note on population: The difference values of population numbers in the table "Population statistic" and in the sections "Ethnicity" & "Religion" is caused by the use of various statistical methods.

=== Religion ===
Census 2021 (1+ %)
Religion	Number	Fraction
Roman Catholic Church	470	49.11%
Calvinist Church	279	29.15%
None	87	9.09%
Not found out	64	6.69%
Christian Congregations in Slovakia	17	1.78%
Greek Catholic Church	17	1.78%
Evangelical Church	10	1.04%
Total	957	

In year 2021 was 957 people by religion 470 from Roman Catholic Church, 279 from Calvinist Church, 87 from None, 64 from Not found out, 17 from Christian Congregations in Slovakia, 17 from Greek Catholic Church, 10 from Evangelical Church, 5 from Apostolic Church, 3 from Other and not ascertained christian church, 2 from Other, 2 from United Methodist Church and 1 from Old Catholic Church.
