= Hodejov =

Village and municipality in Slovakia

Hodejov Várgede
- Municipality
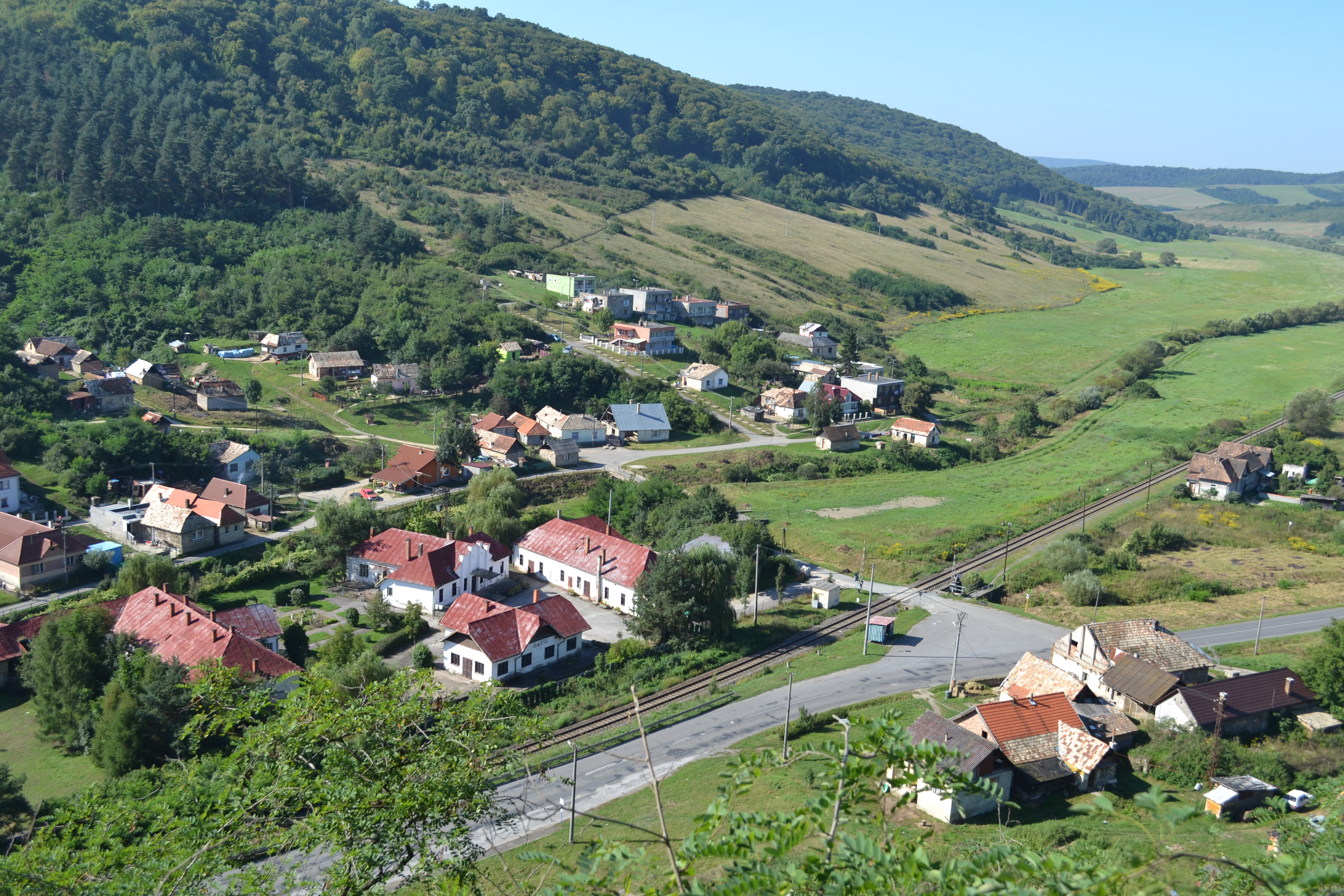

- Flag

- Location of Hodejov in the Banská Bystrica Region Location of Hodejov in Slovakia
- Coordinates: 48.30°N 20.00°E
- Country: Slovakia
- Region: Banská Bystrica Region
- District: Rimavská Sobota District
- First mentioned: 1280

Area
  - Total: 17.24 km^{2} (6.66 sq mi)
- Elevation: 196 m (643 ft)

Population (2025)
  - Total: 1,515
- Time zone: UTC+1 (CET)
  - Summer (DST): UTC+2 (CEST)
- Postal code: 980 31
- Area code: +421 47
- Vehicle registration plate (until 2022): RS
- Website: www.obechodejov.sk

Hodejov (Hungarian: Várgede) is a village and municipality in the Rimavská Sobota District of the Banská Bystrica Region of southern Slovakia.

== Geography ==
The municipality lies at an altitude of 196 metres (643 ft) and covers an area of 17.24 km^{2} (6.66 sq mi) (2025).

== History ==
In historical records, the village was first mentioned in 1280 (Gede), when the local feudatories the Ratoldoy built a castle in the zone. It successively it belonged to families Ilsvay, Palóczy, Országy and Kubiny. In the 16th century the castle was devastated by Turks. In the 18th century the village was ruled by Kubinyi family again. From 1938 to 1944, it was annexed by Hungary.

== Population ==
Population statistic (10 years)
Year	1995	2005	2015	2025
Count	1280	1379	1640	1515
Difference		+7.73%	+18.92%	−7.62%

Population statistic
Year	2024	2025
Count	1513	1515
Difference		+0.13%

It has a population of 1515 people (31 December 2025).

=== Ethnicity ===
Census 2021 (1+ %)
Ethnicity	Number	Fraction
Hungarian	987	64.34%
Slovak	482	31.42%
Romani	187	12.19%
Not found out	77	5.01%
Total	1534	

In year 2021 was 1534 people by ethnicity 987 as Hungarian, 482 as Slovak, 187 as Romani, 77 as Not found out, 6 as Czech, 2 as Italian, 1 as Ukrainian, 1 as Serbian and 1 as Austrian.

Note on population: The difference values of population numbers in the table "Population statistic" and in the sections "Ethnicity" & "Religion" is caused by the use of various statistical methods.

=== Religion ===
Census 2021 (1+ %)
Religion	Number	Fraction
Roman Catholic Church	1024	66.75%
None	305	19.88%
Not found out	137	8.93%
Evangelical Church	31	2.02%
Total	1534	

In year 2021 was 1534 people by religion 1024 from Roman Catholic Church, 305 from None, 137 from Not found out, 31 from Evangelical Church, 14 from Calvinist Church, 9 from Christian Congregations in Slovakia, 6 from Jehovah's Witnesses, 2 from Old Catholic Church, 2 from Other and not ascertained christian church, 2 from Greek Catholic Church and 2 from United Methodist Church.

== Genealogical resources ==
The records for genealogical research are available at the state archive "Statny Archiv in Banska Bystrica, Slovakia"

- Roman Catholic church records (births/marriages/deaths): 1762-1897 (parish A)

== See also ==
- List of municipalities and towns in Slovakia
