= Vas County (former) =

County of the Kingdom of Hungary

Vas County Comitatus Castrifèrreus (Latin) Vas vármegye (Hungarian) Komitat Eisenburg (German)
- County of the Kingdom of Hungary
- 11th century–1946
- Coat of arms

- Capital: Vasvár; Szombathely (1578-1946)
- Area
  - Coordinates: 47°14′N 16°37′E
  - 1910: 5,474 km^{2} (2,114 sq mi)
  - 1930: 3,284 km^{2} (1,268 sq mi)
- Population
  - 1910: 435,793
  - 1930: 275,021
- History
  - Established: 11th century
  - Treaty of Trianon: 4 June 1920
  - Recover of Muravidék: 11 April 1941
  - Monarchy abolished: 1 February 1946
- Today part of: Hungary (3,284 km^{2}) Austria (1,548 km^{2}) Slovenia (642 km^{2})

Vas (Latin: Comitatus Castrifèrreus, German: Eisenburg, Slovene: Železna županija or Železna) was an administrative county (comitatus) of the Kingdom of Hungary. Its territory is now divided between Hungary, Austria and Slovenia.

== Geography ==
Vas County shared borders with the Austrian lands Lower Austria and Styria and the Hungarian counties Sopron, Veszprém and Zala. It stretched between the river Mura in the south, the foothills of the Alps in the west and the river Marcal in the east. The Rába River flowed through the county. Its area was 5474 km² around 1910.

== History ==
Vas County arose as one of the first comitatuses of the Kingdom of Hungary.

In 1920 by the Treaty of Trianon, the western part of the county became part of Austria, and a small part in the southwest became part of the newly formed Kingdom of Serbs, Croats and Slovenes (from 1929 as Yugoslavia). The remainder stayed in Hungary. The former Yugoslavian part of the county was occupied and annexed by Hungary between 1941 and 1945 during World War II. In 1950, a small part of former Sopron County went to Vas county, while some villages north of Zalaegerszeg went to Zala County, and a small region west of Pápa went to Veszprém County.

Since 1991, when Slovenia became independent from Yugoslavia, the Yugoslavian part of former Vas county (known in Slovenian as Prekmurje) has been part of the Republic of Slovenia. In 1919 there was briefly proclaimed Republic of Prekmurje, but it existed only a few days, alike the Lajtabánság.

== Demographics ==
=== 1900 ===
In 1900, the county had a population of 418,905 people and was composed of the following linguistic communities:

Total:

- Hungarian: 222,474 (53.0%)
- German: 125,570 (30.0%)
- Croatian: 17,896 (4.3%)
- Slovak: 284 (0.1%)
- Romanian: 43 (0.0%)
- Serbian: 21 (0.0%)
- Ruthenian: 4 (0.0%)
- Other or unknown: 52,613 (12.6%)

According to the census of 1900, the county was composed of the following religious communities:

Total:

- Roman Catholic: 313,858 (74.9%)
- Lutheran: 83,340 (19.9%)
- Calvinist: 12,151 (2.9%)
- Jewish: 9,429 (2.3%)
- Greek Catholic: 47 (0.0%)
- Greek Orthodox: 47 (0.0%)
- Unitarian: 15 (0.0%)
- Other or unknown: 18 (0.0%)

=== 1910 ===
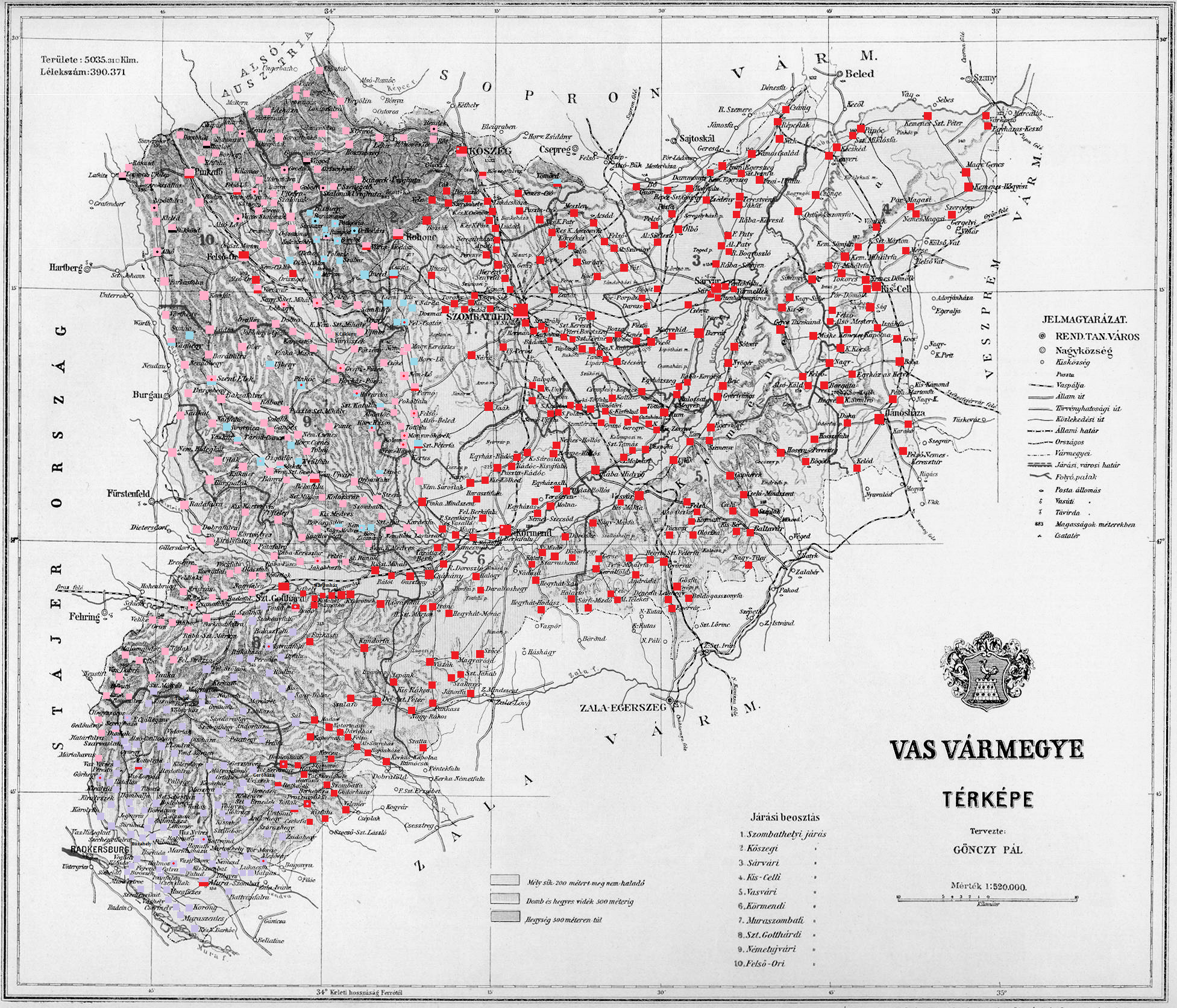
Ethnic map of the county with data of the 1910 census (see the key in the description).

In 1910, the county had a population of 435,793 people and was composed of the following linguistic communities:

Total:

- Hungarian: 247,985 (56.9%)
- German: 117,169 (26.89%)
- Croatian: 16,230 (3.72%)
- Slovak: 288 (0.07%)
- Ruthenian: 48 (0.01%)
- Serbian: 23 (0.01%)
- Romanian: 14 (0.0%)
- Other or unknown: 54,036 (12.4%) (Note: most of them (50,498) Prekmurje Slovene, called Wendish by the Hungarian authorities.)

According to the census of 1910, the county was composed of the following religious communities:

Total:

- Roman Catholic: 331,269 (76.02%)
- Lutheran: 82,027 (18.82%)
- Calvinist: 12,597 (2.89%)
- Jewish: 9,649 (2.21%)
- Greek Catholic: 151 (0.03%)
- Greek Orthodox: 71 (0.02%)
- Unitarian: 19 (0.0%)
- Other or unknown: 10 (0.0%)

== Subdivisions ==
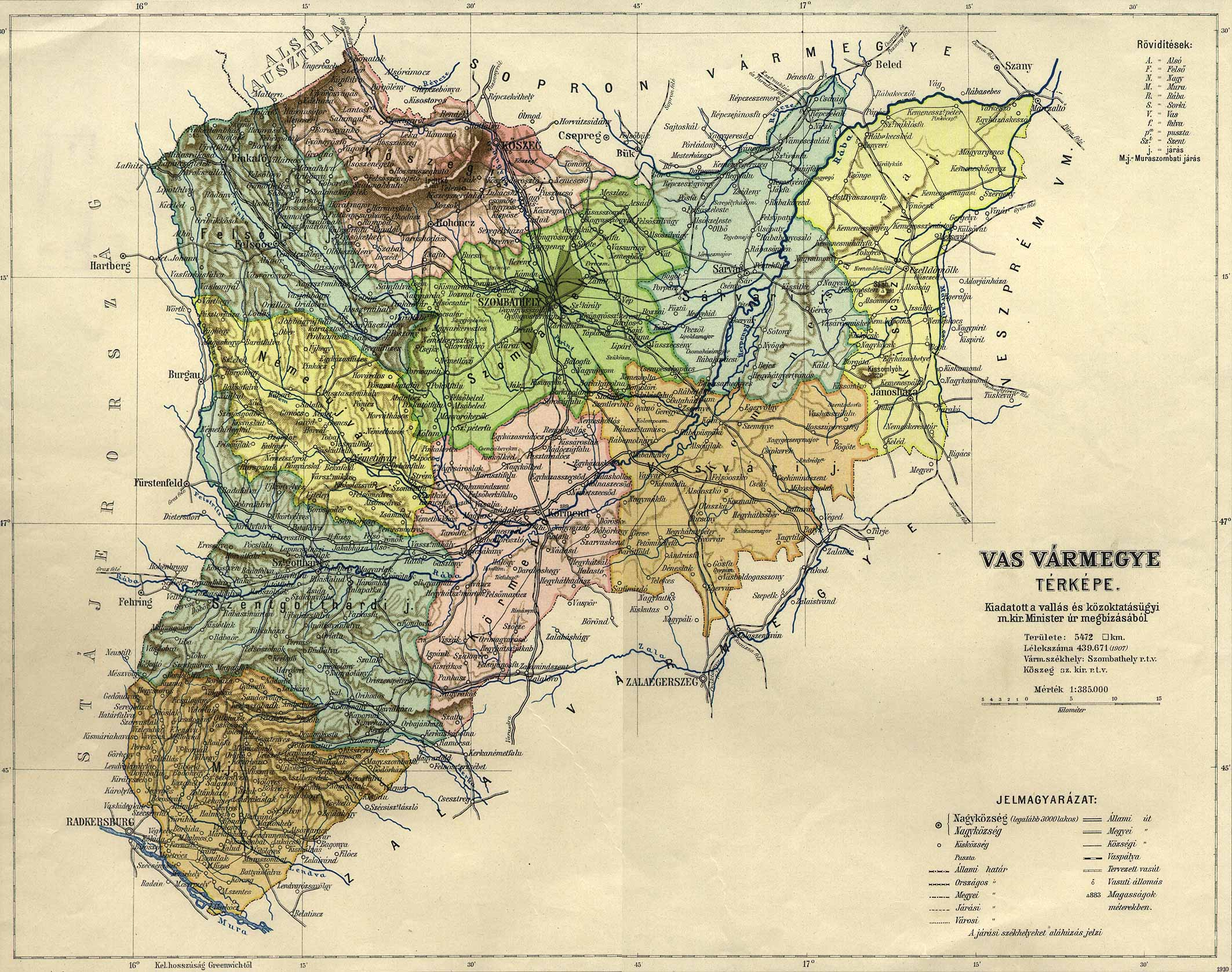

In the early 20th century, the subdivisions of Vas county were:

Districts (járás)
District	Capital
Celldömölk	Celldömölk
Felsőőr	Felsőőr, AT Oberwart
Körmend	Körmend
Kőszeg	Kőszeg
Muraszombat	Muraszombat, SI Murska Sobota
Németújvár	Németújvár, AT Güssing
Sárvár	Sárvár
Szentgotthárd	Szentgotthárd
Szombathely	Szombathely
Vasvár	Vasvár
Urban districts (rendezett tanácsú város)
Kőszeg
Szombathely

The towns of Oberwart and Güssing are now in Austria; Murska Sobota is now in Slovenia.
