= Sopron County =

Historic Hungarian county divided between Austria and Hungary

Sopron County Comitatus Soproniensis (Latin) Sopron vármegye (Hungarian)
- County of the Kingdom of Hungary (11th century-1946); County of the Second Hungarian Republic (1946–1949); County of the Hungarian People's Republic (1949–1950)
- Coat of arms

- Capital: Sopron
- Area
  - Coordinates: 47°41′N 16°35′E
  - 1910: 3,256 km^{2} (1,257 sq mi)
  - 1930: 1,915 km^{2} (739 sq mi)
- Population
  - 1910: 283,500
  - 1930: 179,261
- History
  - Established: 11th century
  - Treaty of Trianon: 4 June 1920
  - Disestablished: 16 March 1950
- Today part of: Hungary (1,915 km^{2}); Austria (1,341 km^{2})

Sopron County was an administrative county (comitatus in Latin) of the Kingdom of Hungary since the 11th century. The capital of the county was Sopron (German: Ödenburg, Slovak: Šopron). Following the Treaty of Trianon in 1920, its territory was divided between Austria and Hungary.

== Geography ==
Sopron county shared borders with the Austrian land Lower Austria and the Hungarian counties Moson, Győr, Veszprém and Vas. The Lake Neusiedl (Hungarian: Fertő tó, German: Neusiedler See) lay in the county. Its area was about 3,256 km^{2} around 1910.

== History ==
Sopron County arose as one of the first counties of the Kingdom of Hungary. The county was established in the 11th century by King Stephen I of Hungary during the foundation of the Hungarian kingdom and the organization of the royal county system, with its administrative centre at Sopronvár (present-day Sopron), on the lands of the Osl clan.

In 1920, by the Treaty of Trianon the western part of the county became part of Austria, while the eastern part became a part of Hungary. In 1921, it was decided by referendum that the city of Sopron and eight surrounding settlements would join Hungary instead of Austria.

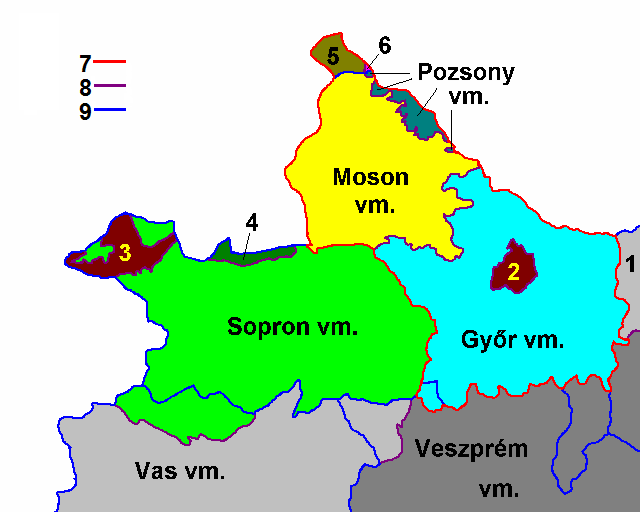
Sopron County after the Treaty of Trianon. (3) The city of Sopron (urban county) (4) territory transferred from Moson County to Sopron County in 1921.

In 1950, Sopron county merged with Győr-Moson county to form Győr-Sopron county, while a small part of Sopron county went to Vas County. The county was renamed to Győr-Moson-Sopron county in 1990.

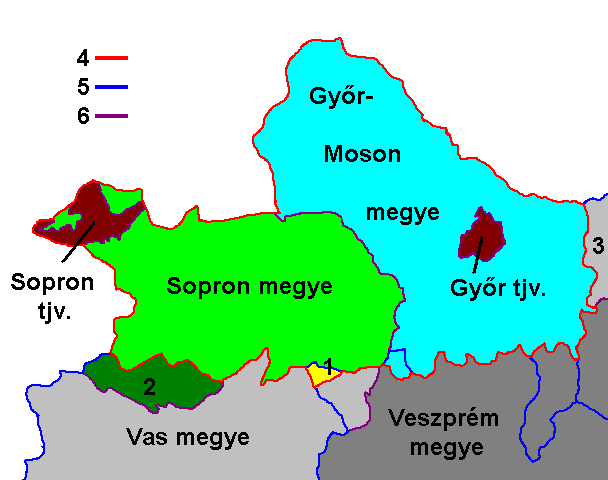
The formation of modern Győr-Sopron County. (1) territory assigned from Vas County to Győr-Sopron County in 1950. (2) territory assigned from Sopron County to Vas County in 1950.

== Demographics ==
=== 1900 ===
In 1900, the county had a population of 279,796 people and was composed of the following linguistic communities:

Total:

- Hungarian: 136,616 (48.8%)
- German: 109,369 (39.1%)
- Croatian: 31,317 (11.2%)
- Slovak: 505 (0.2%)
- Romanian: 22 (0.0%)
- Serbian: 12 (0.0%)
- Ruthenian: 4 (0.0%)
- Other or unknown: 1,951 (0.7%)

According to the census of 1900, the county was composed of the following religious communities:

Total:

- Roman Catholic: 235,390 (84.1%)
- Lutheran: 33,924 (12.1%)
- Jewish: 9,736 (3,5)
- Calvinist: 641 (0.2%)
- Greek Catholic: 53 (0.0%)
- Greek Orthodox: 26 (0.0%)
- Unitarian: 15 (0.0%)
- Other or unknown: 11 (0.0%)

=== 1910 ===
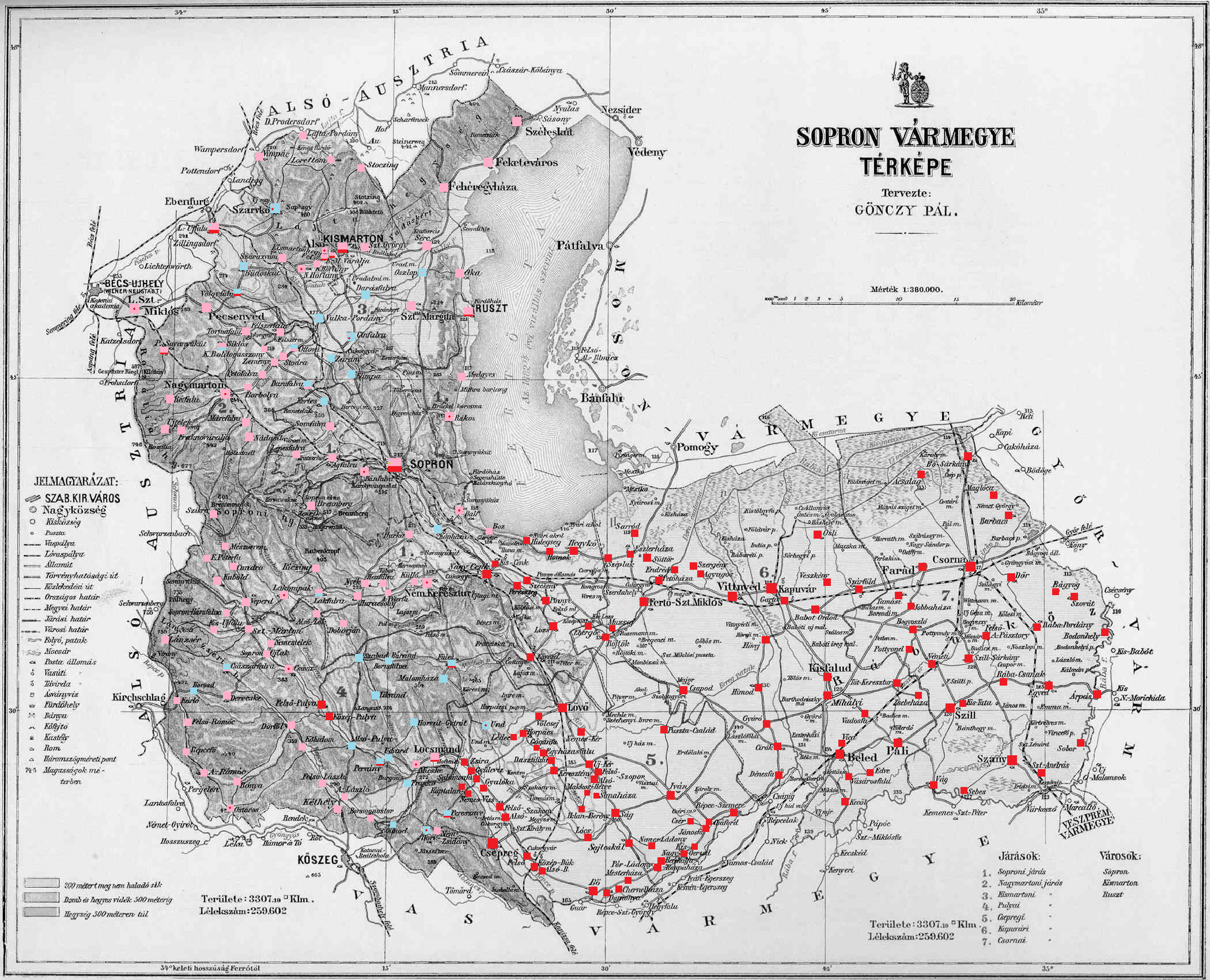
Ethnic map of the county with data of the 1910 census (see the key in the description).

In 1910, the county had a population of 283,510 people and was composed of the following linguistic communities:

Total:

- Hungarian: 141,011 (49.7%)
- German: 109,160 (38.5%)
- Croatian: 31,004 (10.9%)
- Slovak: 397 (0.1%)
- Romanian: 33 (0.0%)
- Serbian: 15 (0.0%)
- Ruthenian: 4 (0.0%)
- Other or unknown: 1,886 (0.7%)

According to the census of 1910, the county was composed of the following religious communities:

Total:

- Roman Catholic: 239,578 (84.5%)
- Lutheran: 34,820 (12.3%)
- Jewish: 8,192 (2,9)
- Calvinist: 743 (0.3%)
- Greek Catholic: 93 (0.0%)
- Greek Orthodox: 50 (0.0%)
- Unitarian: 27 (0.0%)
- Other or unknown: 7 (0.0%)

== Subdivisions ==
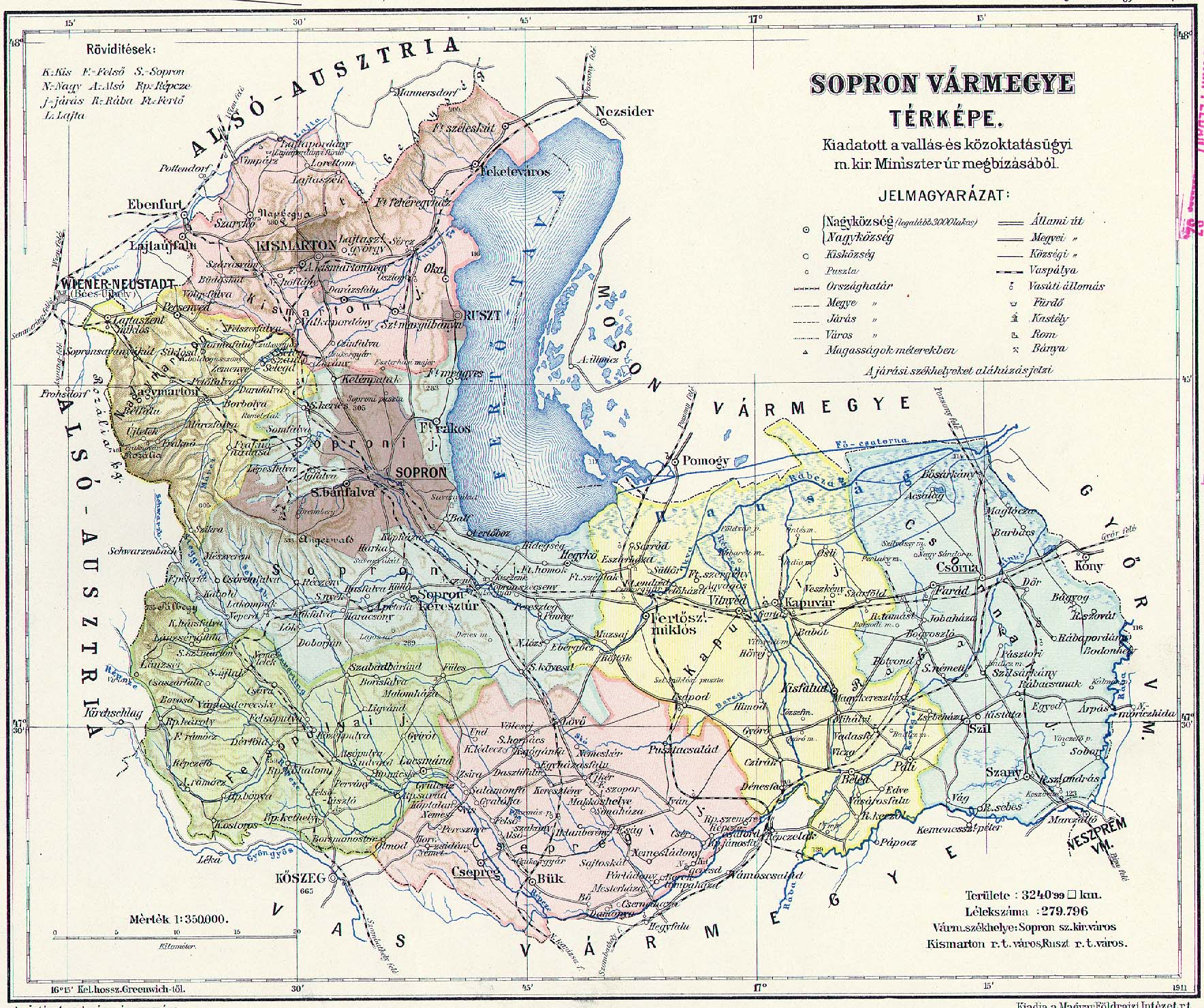
Subdivisions of Sopron County in 1910

In the early 20th century, the subdivisions of Sopron county were:

Districts (járás)
District	Capital
Csepreg	Csepreg
Csorna	Csorna
Felsőpulya	Felsőpulya, AT Oberpullendorf
Kapuvár	Kapuvár
Kismarton	Kismarton, AT Eisenstadt
Nagymarton	Nagymarton, AT Mattersburg
Sopron	Sopron
Urban counties (törvényhatósági jogú város)
Sopron
Urban districts (rendezett tanácsú város)
Kismarton, AT Eisenstadt
Ruszt, AT Rust

Eisenstadt, Mattersburg, Rust and Oberpullendorf are now in Austria.
