= Amadeus Gutkeled =

Amadeus (II) Gutkeled

Ispán of Zala
- Reign: 1276
- Predecessor: Baldwin Rátót
- Successor: Baldwin Rátót
- Died: after 1276
- Noble family: gens Gutkeled
- Issue: Nicholas Felsőlendvai
- Father: Amadeus I

Amadeus (II) from the kindred Gutkeled (Hungarian: Gutkeled nembeli (II.) Amadé; died after 1276) was a Hungarian lord and military leader in the second half of the 13th century, who served as ispán of Vas County from 1272 to 1273 and in 1275, and also administered Zala County in 1276. The prestigious Felsőlendvai family descended from him.

== Family ==
Amadeus (or Omodeus) was born into the powerful gens (clan) Gutkeled as the son of Amadeus "the Black", whose parentage is unknown, thus there is inability to connect Amadeus' branch to the other branches of the clan. He had two brothers, Lothard (I) – progenitor of the influential Amadé de Várkony family, which flourished until 1845, in addition to the Várkonyi and Bősi families – and Ampud, who was ancestor of the Marcaltövi (or Bagaméri) family.

Based on a royal charter from 1286, Amadeus had multiple children from his unidentified wife, but of these only one son is known by name, Nicholas, who was a faithful commander of King Charles I of Hungary during his unification war in the 1310s, serving as Ban of Slavonia from 1323 to 1325. He was the first member of the Felsőlendvai family, which, however, became extinct in the mid-1350s.

== Career ==
Amadeus and his brothers inherited their estates from their father in Gút in Fejér County (present-day a borough of Isztimér), the neighboring lands Marcaltő, Malomsok and Szente at the confluence of Marcal and Rába in the borderland of Veszprém and Győr counties, in addition to Bagamér in Bihar County.

As a noble from Transdanubia, Amadeus came to prominence in the autumn of 1272, when the minor King Ladislaus IV ascended the Hungarian throne under the guardianship of his distant relative Joachim Gutkeled, which marked the beginning of the era of feudal anarchy. Amadeus was installed as ispán of Vas County in September 1272. In this capacity, he played a prominent role in the emerging Bohemian–Hungarian War. He took part in defending the western border region, when Ottokar II of Bohemia sent troops to plunder the surrounding region, which affected mostly Slavonia and Vas County. In early February 1273, Amadeus was among those lords, who led the Hungarian incursions into Austria and Styria, alongside Matthew Csák, Joachim Gutkeled, Ivan Kőszegi and Denis Péc. Amadeus commanded the contingent of castle warriors from Vas County during the incursion to Styria. He was present at the siege of Fürstenfeld. Meanwhile, he was replaced as ispán around May 1273, when Dowager Queen Elizabeth the Cuman temporarily took control of the royal council on behalf of his minor son Ladislaus, after Ottokar II invaded the Kingdom of Hungary in April.

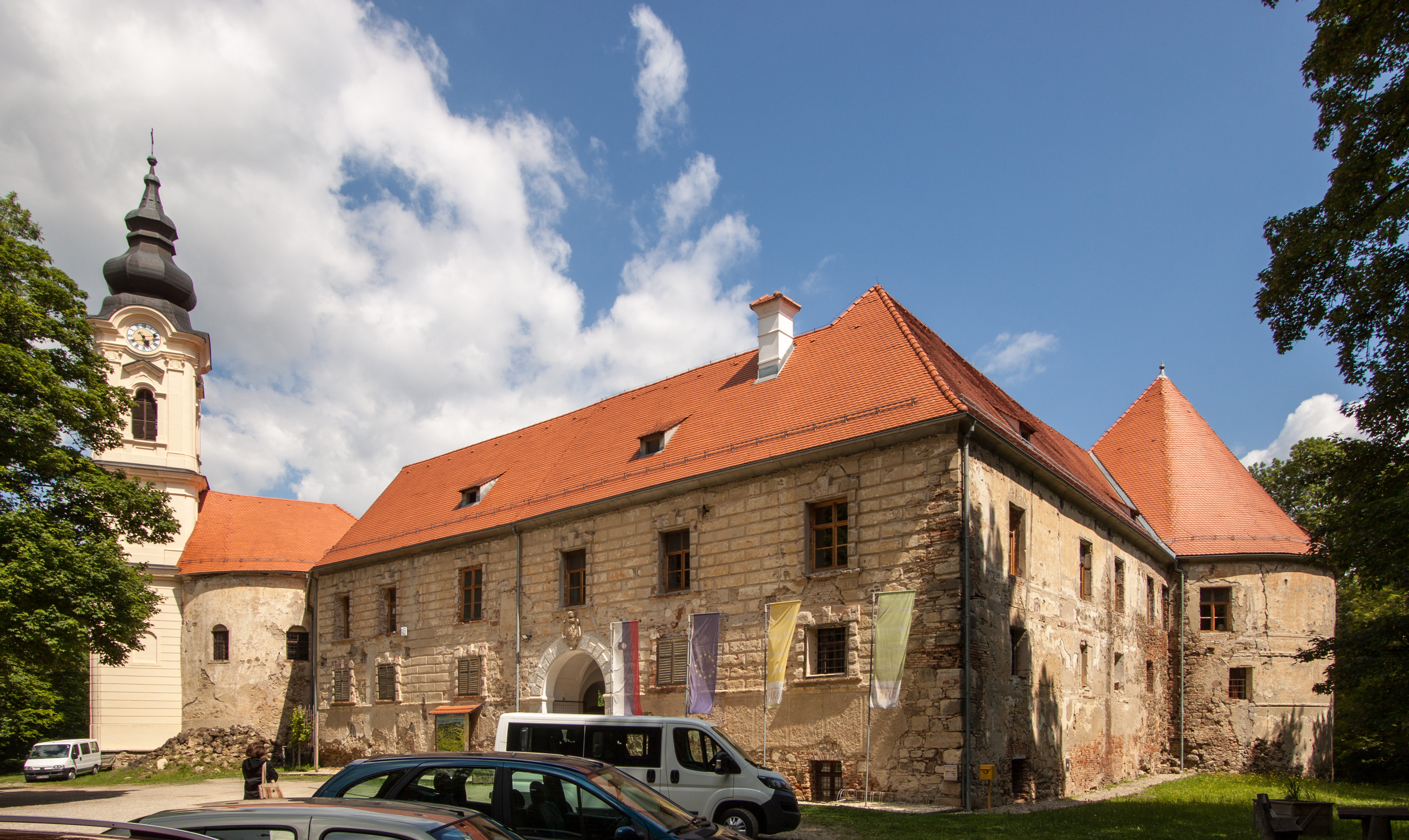
The castle of Grad (Felsőlendva) in Slovenia

Amadeus returned to the royal court as ispán of Vas County in August 1275, when the Kőszegi–Gutkeled baronial group retook power after an absence of three quarters of a year. He lost the position by December 1275, when the rival Csák-dominated group again dominated the royal council. However, Amadeus soon switched sides and reconciled with the Csák government in the winter of 1275. Therefore, Amadeus was granted the castle of Felsőlendva (or simply Lendva, present-day Grad, Slovenia) and its accessories in Vas County by Ladislaus IV on 10 December 1275. The royal charter mentions Amadeus' services during the reign of Kings Béla IV and Stephen V without specifics. Amadeus purchased the castle and its area from Solomon Dárói for 300 silver marks (Amadeus paid only 250, the remaining 50 was added by his son in 1308). Sometime in the first half of 1276, he was also appointed ispán of Zala County.

The Csáks were deprived from power in June 1276 at the latest, because Peter Csák plundered the territory of the Diocese of Veszprém with brutal means. Amadeus, now belonging to them, also lost his office, when the Csáks' enemies, including Amadeus relatives, summoned a diet (communis congregatio) to Buda. There, on 21 June 1276, a verdict stated that sometime before, Amadeus looted and destroyed two villages, Monyorósd and Szőce in Vas County possessed by Andrew Nádasd, the Count of the Royal Armour-Bearers (Latin: comes armigerorum). As a compensation, Ladislaus IV confiscated the village Gógánfa in Veszprém County from Amadeus and donated it to Andrew Nádasd. Since the date of the charter is only partially legible, many historians have placed the year of issuance at 1286, which, however, contradicts the temporal circumstances of Amadeus' death (see below).

After 1276, Amadeus' name disappears from sources. He was deceased by 18 June 1286, when Ladislaus IV assured his widow and orphans that he would confirm all the royal donations he had once made in his favor, and promised to confirm the donations with a golden bull at an opportune moment if the situation in the realm improved. His widow was still alive in 1332; in that year, she chased the parish priest out of his church in Ság (near Iharosberény) in Somogy County.

== Sources ==
- Bácsatyai, Dániel (2021). "A 13. századi uralkodói nagy- és kettőspecsétek kronológiája [Chronology of 13th-century royal grand and double seals in Hungary]". Turul (in Hungarian). 94 (1): 1–22. ISSN 1216-7258.
- Karácsonyi, János (1900). A magyar nemzetségek a XIV. század közepéig. [The Hungarian genera until the middle of the 14th century] (in Hungarian). Hungarian Academy of Sciences.
- Rudolf, Veronika (2023). Közép-Európa a hosszú 13. században [Central Europe in the Long 13th Century] (in Hungarian). Arpadiana XV., Research Centre for the Humanities. ISBN 978-963-416-406-7.
- Zsoldos, Attila (2011). Magyarország világi archontológiája, 1000–1301 [Secular Archontology of Hungary, 1000–1301] (in Hungarian). História, MTA Történettudományi Intézete. ISBN 978-963-9627-38-3.

Amadeus II Genus Gutkeled Born: ? Died: after 1276
Political offices
Preceded by Gregory Monoszló	Ispán of Vas; 1272–1273	Succeeded by Gregory Monoszló
Preceded by Roland Rátót	Ispán of Vas; 1275	Succeeded by Herrand Héder
Preceded by Baldwin Rátót	Ispán of Zala; 1276	Succeeded by Baldwin Rátót
