= Nicholas Felsőlendvai =

Hungarian nobleman and military leader

Nicholas (I) Felsőlendvai
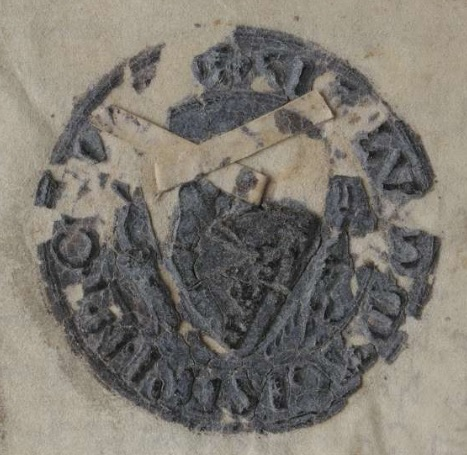
- Fragment of Felsőlendvai's seal, 1323

Ban of Slavonia
- Reign: 1323–1325
- Predecessor: John Babonić
- Successor: Mikcs Ákos
- Died: April or May 1325
- Noble family: House of Felsőlendvai
- Spouse: N. Monoszló
- Issue: Nicholas II
- Father: Amadeus Gutkeled

Nicholas (I) Felsőlendvai (Hungarian: Felsőlendvai (I.) Miklós, Croatian: Nikola Omodejev; died April or May 1325) was an influential Hungarian baron and military leader, who served as Ban of Slavonia from 1323 until his death.

Initially a familiaris of the powerful Kőszegi family, he swore loyalty to Charles I of Hungary and played eminent role in defeating the oligarchs – including his former lords – in the 1310s. The monarch entrusted him with the administration of several counties and newly regained royal castles mostly in Transdanubia before appointing him as Ban of Slavonia. His attempt to restore Hungarian suzerainty over Croatia was unsuccessful. He was the progenitor of the Felsőlendvai (or Rupolyi) family, which, however, became extinct a few decades later.

== Early life ==
Nicholas Felsőlendvai was born into the powerful and extended gens (clan) Gutkeled. His father was Amadeus Gutkeled, who administered Vas and Zala counties in the 1270s. He died sometime before 1286. In that year, King Ladislaus IV of Hungary assured his widow and orphans that he would confirm all the royal donations he had once made in his favor, and promised to confirm the donations with a golden bull at an opportune moment if the situation in the realm improved. Among Amadeus' multiple children, only the name of Nicholas is known. His unidentified mother was still alive in 1332, outliving Nicholas.

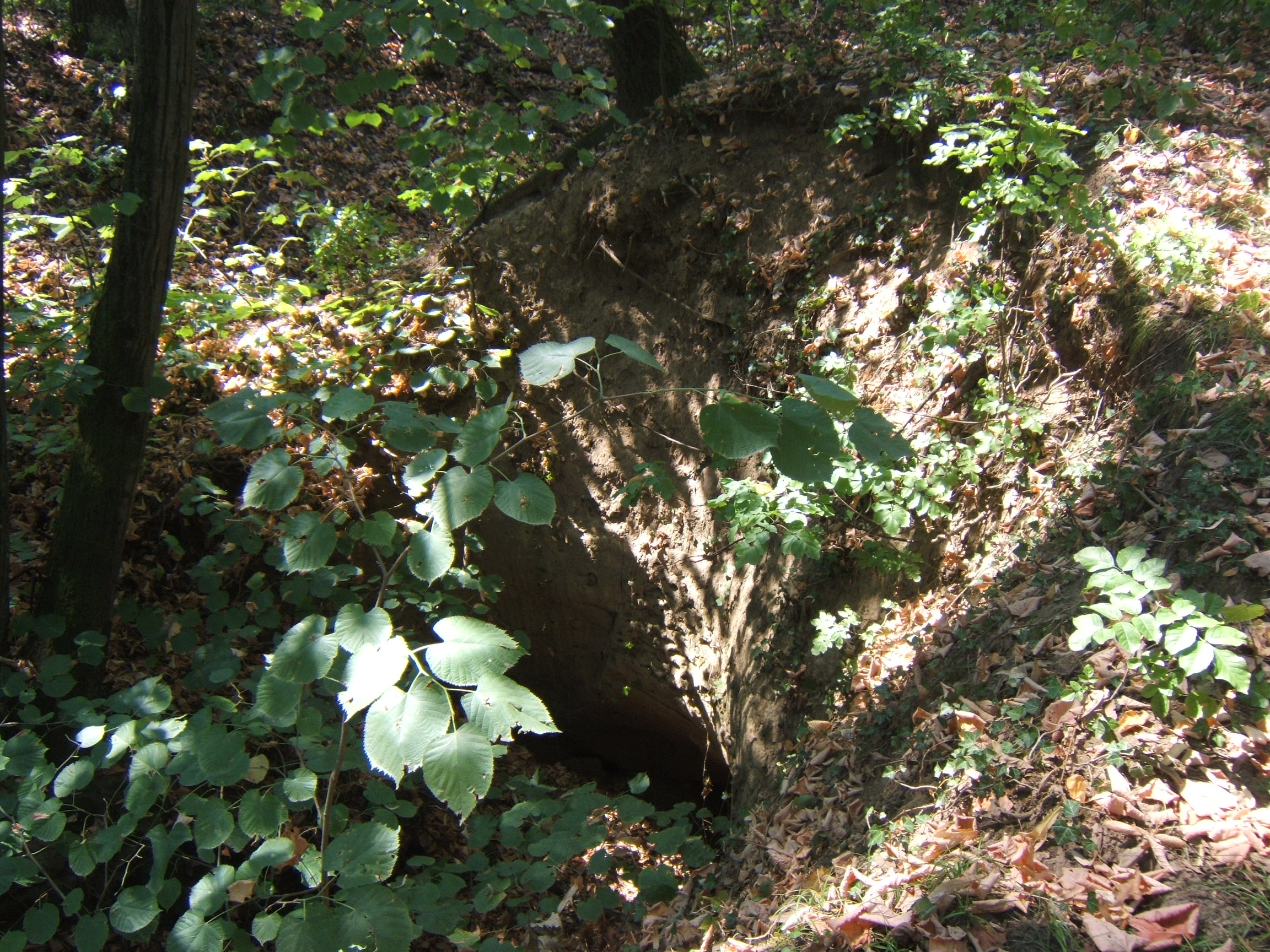
The ruins of Rupoly Castle, possessed by Nicholas Felsőlendvai since 1313

Felsőlendvai is first mentioned by contemporary records in 1292, when he was a landowner in Bagamér in Bihar County, and took part in the process of the determination of its borders along with his neighbors. He also possessed inherited landholdings Gút in Fejér County (present-day a borough of Isztimér), the neighboring lands Marcaltő, Malomsok and Szente at the confluence of Marcal and Rába in the borderland of Veszprém and Győr counties, in addition to his main residence, the castle of Felsőlendva (or simply Lendva, present-day Grad, Slovenia) and its accessories in Vas County. He paid the remaining 50 silver marks to Stephen Dárói, a descendant of the original owner family in 1308. Similarly to the majority of nobles in the region Western Transdanubia and Slavonia, Felsőlendvai also entered the service of the powerful Kőszegi family. He was mentioned as an owner of Mórichely (present-day a borough of Nagykanizsa) in Zala County in 1307. Felsőlendvai married an unidentified daughter of Egidius Monoszló, who was once a powerful lord in the 1270s. The dying Egidius bequeathed half portion of the castle of Rupoly (or Ropoly) and its lordship in Somogy County (present-day Bőszénfa and Kaposvár) to Felsőlendvai in his last will in 1313. Thereafter, his family was also known as Rupolyi. Pál Engel argued that Felsőlendvai was only a maternal relative (cognatus) of Egidius Monoszló.

== Military career ==
Felsőlendvai remained a supporter of the Kőszegis during the era of Interregnum in the first decade of the 14th century. In the first half of 1310, he still acted as a representative and trustee of his lord, Ban Henry Kőszegi during a mortgage agreement with members of the Héder clan, regarding the estate Déshida in Somogy County. Felsőlendvai was referred to as a leading member of the entourage of John Kőszegi (Henry's son) in 1313. However, soon Charles I, who had defeated his rivals and became the undisputed King of Hungary, decided to eliminate the de facto independent oligarchic domains throughout the kingdom, including the Kőszegis' territory in Western Transdanubia and Slavonia. Charles waged war with the southern Kőszegi dominion in the first half of 1316; as a result, several familiares of John Kőszegi left his allegiance, including Felsőlendvai. He was present in the royal camp in Zsibót, Baranya County (present-day a borough of Szigetvár) in May 1316, when the monarch returned possessions to the minor sons of the late James Győr upon the request of some lords, including Felsőlendvai. He participated in the subsequent military campaign against his former lord; the power of John Kőszegi in Southern Transdanubia was eliminated by August. In the charter, Felsőlendvai is mentioned as a "baron" without holding any dignity.

In the winter of 1317, when Serbian monarch Stefan Uroš II Milutin invaded Syrmia, Charles I launched a counter-campaign across the river Sava and seized the fortress of Macsó (present-day Mačva, Serbia). Felsőlendvai took part in the campaign as commander of the vanguard and he and his troops supervised the crossing of the frozen river for the royal army. He played a role in the capture of Macsó too. In contrast, Gyula Kristó placed the date of Charles' first campaign against Serbia in the winter of 1314 (which assumes Felsőlendvai's changeover by then). In February 1317, Charles I donated the lands Berény, Dencs and Osztopán in Somogy County to Felsőlendvai, rewarding his loyalty and role in the previous year's campaign, and because he submitted 'all of his and his servants' possessions and goods" for the king's cause. Since all of these were queenly estates prior to that, Queen Maria of Bytom formally contributed to the donation. Felsőlendvai was installed as ispán of Baranya and Bács counties by May 1317, holding both positions until 1318 or 1319. Around the same time, he also became castellan of Szekcső, also a former stronghold of the Kőszegis in Baranya County, holding the position at least until early 1324. Felsőlendvai took part in the royal campaign against the dominion of Matthew Csák, the most powerful oligarch, in September–October 1317. Alongside Thomas Szécsényi and Paul Jánki, he commanded his troops to successfully besiege Visegrád, while Charles captured Komárom with the assistance of Austrian auxiliary troops.

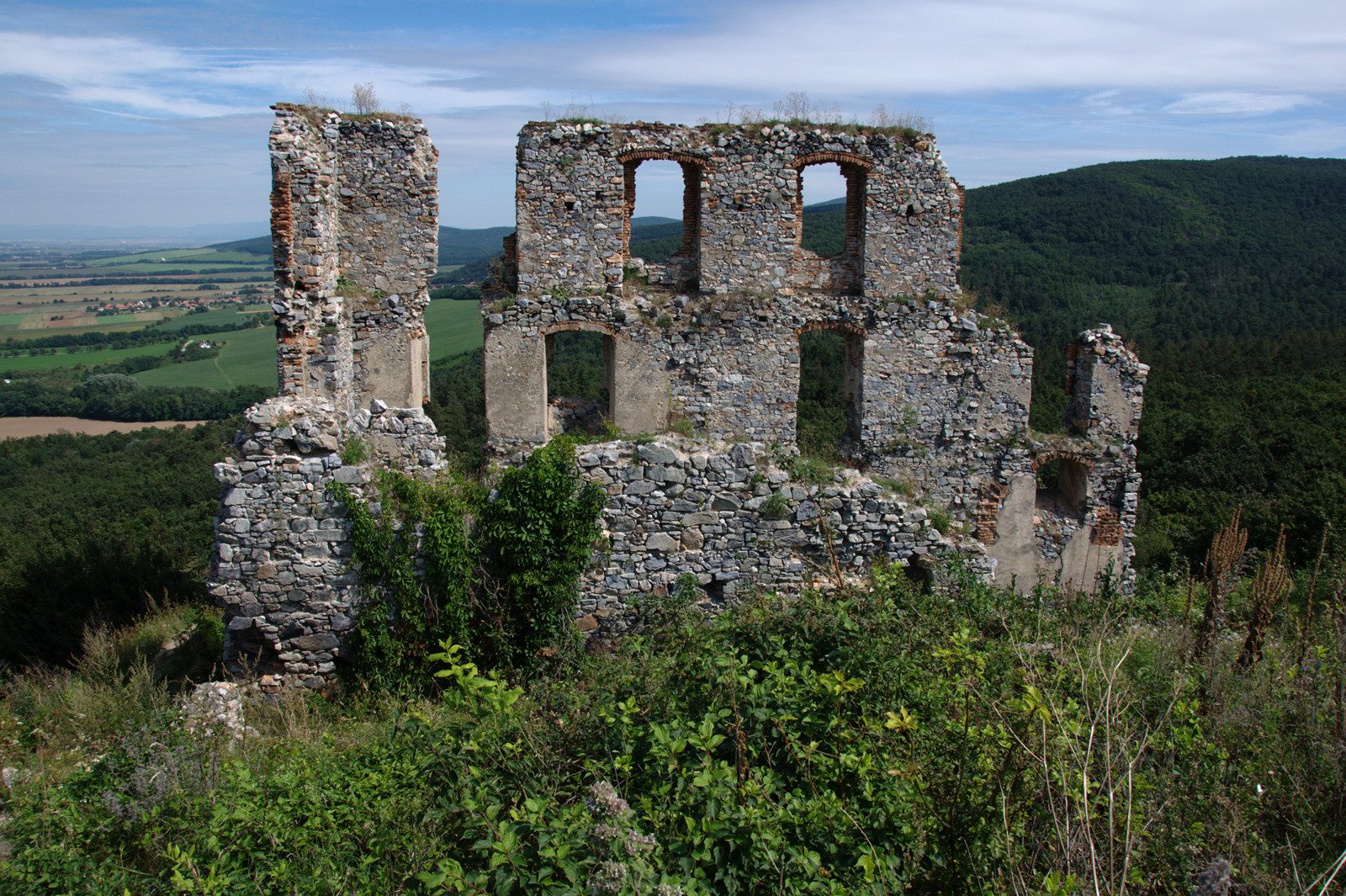
The castle of Oponice (today in Slovakia) was among the forts were captured by Nicholas Felsőlendvai during the 1321 royal campaign

Charles I appointed Felsőlendvai as ispán of Sopron County and castellan of Kapuvár in the second half of 1318. He held both positions until his death. In this capacity, Felsőlendvai returned the estates Csele and Jenő in Baranya County to the Dominican nuns of Margaret Island upon their request in that year. As ispán of Sopron County, Felsőlendvai played a decisive role in the crushing of the rebellion of Andrew Kőszegi against the royal authority in the spring of 1319. Charles I entrusted Alexander Köcski and him to lead a royal campaign against his remaining dominion. Their army defeated the Kőszegi troops at Szalafő and captured Andrew's last strongholds. According to a royal charter, Felsőlendvai captured six Austrian robber barons – by name, Scedeker, Gelleuser, Pronnar, Preguar, Wyrdusmodar and Preghamar –, who served in Andrew's army. Kristó argued that all sieges occurred Andrew's first (and only) rebellion in the summer of 1317, and he considered a brief Austrian-led border raid in support of Andrew Kőszegi took place only in 1319. Felsőlendvai issued a charter in Sopron in May 1319, implying that military operations were completed by then.

Sometime around 1320, Felsőlendvai was made ispán of Komárom County, also serving as the castellan of its important stronghold Komárom (first mentioned in these positions in 1323 and 1321, respectively), which protected the central areas of the kingdom from possible attacks by Matthew Csák from the northwest. When Matthew Csák died in March 1321, his province collapsed within months. Felsőlendvai gathered his troops and occupied vas majority of his domain without resistance. His soldiers seized the forts Appony (Oponice), Privigye (Prievidza), Bajmóc (Bojnice) and Ugróc (Uhrovec) in Nyitra County in April–May 1321. Felsőlendvai issued his charter in Nagytapolcsány (Topoľčany) in June 1321, starting to reward those who left Matthew's camp. Felsőlendvai handed over the castles to Charles I who arrived the region in July 1321 in order to besiege Trencsén (Trenčín). Most of the Csáks' castellans swore loyalty to the monarch.

== Ban of Slavonia ==
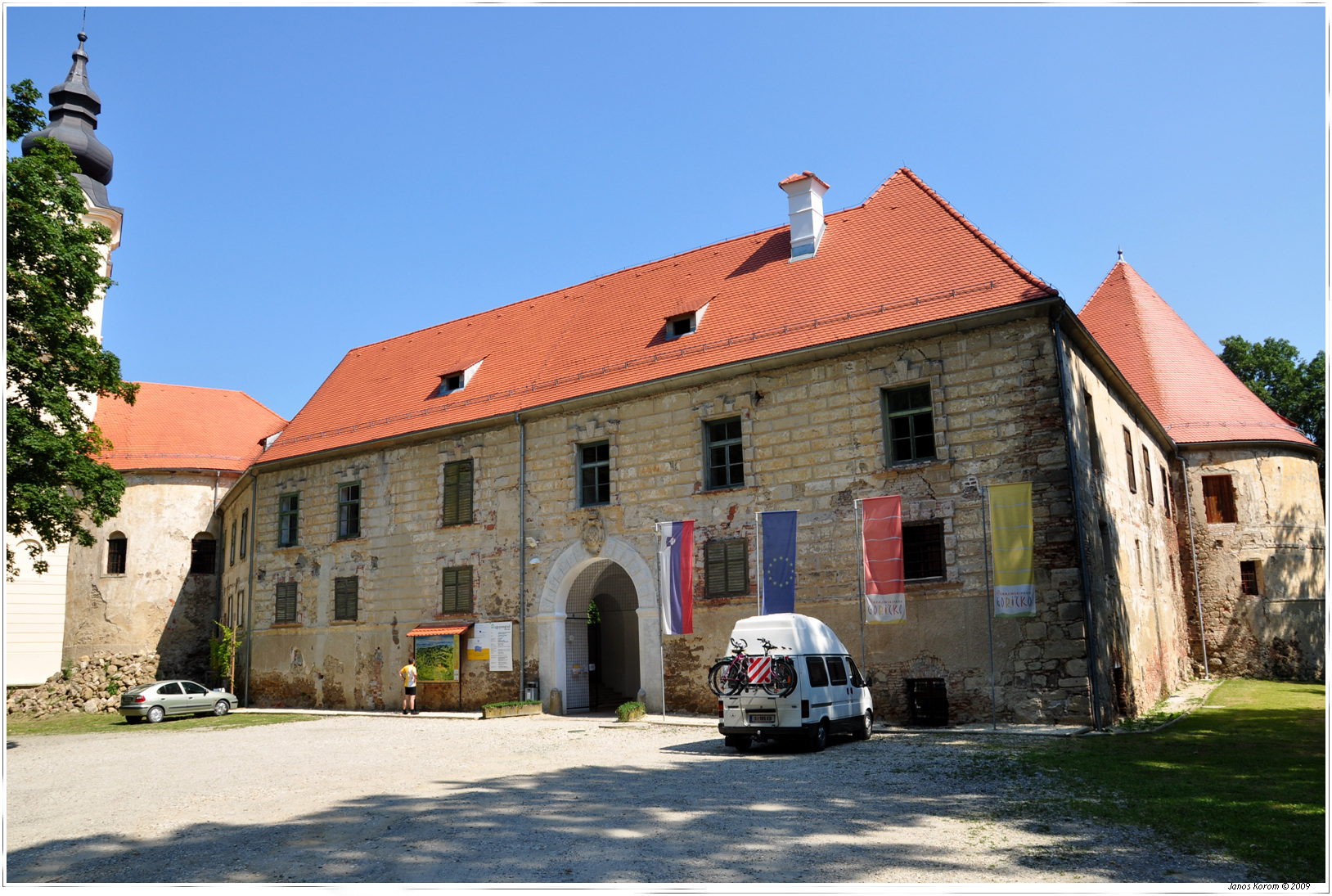
The castle of Grad (Felsőlendva), present-day in Slovenia, the seat of Nicholas Felsőlendvai throughout his life

Charles I decided to replace John Babonić with Nicholas Felsőlendvai as Ban of Slavonia in late 1322 or early 1323. Felsőlendvai first appears in the dignity in February 1323. Hungarian historian Attila Zsoldos argued the replacement occurred when Charles I stayed in Zagreb in October 1322. The reason for his decision is uncertain. 19th-century Hungarian historian Antal Pór considered John was perhaps not decisive enough to "settle South Slavic affairs", while Lajos Thallóczy argued the Croatian nobles resented the fact that a lord from Slavonia be their superior. Gyula Kristó argued John Babonić was the "last oligarch", and by the end of 1322 Charles saw the time had come to end his power. Zsoldos considered John Babonić did not fall out of favor with the king, since he held a courtly position until his death thereafter. However, he – since his sons had died by then – adopted his nephew John (II) as his son without the king's approval in 1321, which was contrary to Charles's policy (automatic inheritance of vast wealth, i.e. oligarchic power). Croatian historian Vjekoslav Klaić claimed that Felsőlendvai was appointed ban in 1322 and he jointly held the dignity with John Babonić for a year, but this assumption is based on two misdated royal charters. Antun Nekić argued that John Babonić was a "symbol of the preceding period; an oligarch who did not owe his position to Charles I in any way", while Felsőlendvai rose to the elite due to his loyalty and service during Charles' war against the oligarchs, he – and his successor Mikcs Ákos – were "creatures" of Charles I, belonging the king's "new aristocracy".

In April 1323, Felsőlendvai was among the signatory barons, who confirmed the peace treaty between Charles I of Hungary and Frederick the Fair with their seals ending the hostiles between them. In that year, Felsőlendvai was also included in that common Austrian–Hungarian commission whose mandate was to resolve disputed issues regarding the adjustment of borders. In this capacity, Felsőlendvai was responsible for Sopron County along its western border with the duchies of Austria, Styria and Carniola. A fragment of his wax seal of his signet ring was preserved in May 1323, depicting a triangular shield with dragon teeth, the common symbol of the Gutkeled clan, and its circumscription "+ SIG[IL]LUM MAGISTRI NIC[OLAI]", with two animals on the side (dragon or wolf).

Micha Madius de Barbazanis, a contemporary chronicler and a nobleman from Split (Spalato), narrates that John Babonić rebelled against the king (or protested against his removal) and subsequently even an armed clash occurred with the troops of Felsőlendvai upon the latter's arrival to Slavonia in May 1323. The Babonić troops attempted to prevent the army of Felsőlendvai, consisted of Hungarians and Cumans, from crossing the Drava. However, the royal army crushed the resistance, capturing numerous soldiers and 400 horses. The arriving Felsőlendvai, who was escorted by Palatine Philip Drugeth too, was entrusted to launch a military expedition to Croatia in late summer of 1323, against Ivan Nelipić, a rebellious Croatian lord, who established a sovereign power after the fall of the oligarchic Šubić family. The campaign eventually failed after short-lived successes, although, it did rise up George II Šubić against Nelipić. Hungary's suzerainty over Croatia and Dalmatia remained nominal until 1345.

On his way back to north, Felsőlendvai sought to restore royal power and previous social relations in Slavonia. In September 1323, he confirmed the city privileges of Omiš (Almissa), allegedly granted by Andrew II of Hungary in accordance with the same rights as the city of Split in 1207, upon the request of its burghers. The original 13th-century charter, however, is a forgery. In October 1323, he returned the land Crala to the Cistercians of Topusko upon the request of its abbot. Felsőlendvai summoned a general assembly (congregatio generalis) at the king's order for the province of Slavonia in Križevci in January 1324. The annual regular assemblies then began in the province. He confirmed the privileges of the castle warriors of Zagreb in the same month. Felsőlendvai was made ispán of Somogy County in late 1324 or early 1325. Nicholas Felsőlendvai died suddenly sometime between 14 April and 27 May 1325. He was succeeded by Mikcs Ákos as Ban of Slavonia.

== Personal life and descendants ==
Felsőlendvai bought Ivánc, which laid near his castle at Felsőlendva, from John Szabari in June 1323. Beyond the purchase price, he commiserated John and handed over his property acquired by mortgage, a small land of Baráti in Somogy County to him. He was granted Ikrény in Győr County by Charles I in 1324. Residing at the castle of Zákány in Somogy County, Felsőlendvai donated his estates Malomsok and Szente in Győr County to his first cousin once removed Stephen Marcaltövi for his services in April 1325, not long before his death.

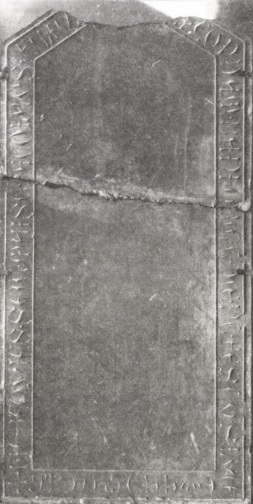
The tombstone of Nicholas (II) Felsőlendvai (d. 1346) from Segesd

Felsőlendvai and his unidentified wife from the gens (clan) Monoszló had a son Nicholas (II). It is possible he was still minor during his father's death and his guardian was Judge royal Paul Nagymartoni in the subsequent years. He married Margaret, a daughter of Philip Drugeth. Despite his influential relatives, he did not hold a position at the royal court. He took a portion in Inke in Somogy County as a pledge in 1341. He bought a portion in Pálca and the village Déshida in the same county in 1343. According to his red marble tombstone from Segesd, he died on 20 October 1346. This tombstone is the earliest piece of a secular lord's tomb and also contains the earliest known Arabic numeral from medieval Hungary. A day after his death, on 21 October, the relative Várkonyi family claimed their purported share from his wealth, referring to the common ancestor, and they forbade everyone, especially Nagymartoni, from selling or donating any property from the inheritance.

Nicholas (II) had two sons, Amadeus and John. The latter was still a minor in 1354. Together with their mother Margaret, they took action on customs in Letenye (Zala County) in 1347. They sent Denis Balogdi, their castellan in Felsőlendva, to represent them during a border-drawing process in Petánc (present-day Petanjci, Slovenia) in 1348. They exchanged their portion in Bagamér for Gyimót in Veszprém County and Szentmiklós in Baranya County with the Diocese of Várad in the same year. John Ellyei functioned as their castellan in Rupoly during that time. They sought to exchange their estate Balogd (near Nagybajom) for the estates Szenttrinitás and Kakonya in 1349. After that year, Amadeus is no longer mentioned. The Várkonyi and Marcaltövi families filed a lawsuit against John for their claimed share from the castle of Felsőlendva in 1353–1354. They falsely claimed that their ancestors (the uncles of Nicholas Felsőlendvai) were also granted the aforementioned fort, despite the fact that of the three brothers, only Amadeus Gutkeled received it in 1275. The royal court ruled in favor of the Felsőlendvais. John exchanged the estate Németi for Varjas (present-day boroughs of Somogyszentpál) in 1356. John died without male descendants around 1357, thus the Felsőlendvai (or Rupolyi) family became extinct after three generations. Their landholdings escheated to the crown. Louis I of Hungary donated Felsőlendva to Palatine Nicholas Kont in 1358, who returned it in exchange for Ilok (Újlak) to the king in 1364. In the next year, Nicholas Szécsi and his family, in exchange for Éleskő, Borsod County, acquired the castle which became their permanent seat for centuries. Thomas Vásári was granted the castle of Rupoly by Louis I in 1358. Abandoning the old fort, he or his sons built a new castle, which was first mentioned by contemporary sources in 1387. Thereafter the family was called with the surname Rupolújvári (lit. "Rupol's New Castle").

== Sources ==
- Engel, Pál (1988). "Az ország újraegyesítése. I. Károly küzdelmei az oligarchák ellen (1310–1323) [Reunification of the Realm. The Struggles of Charles I Against the Oligarchs (1310–1323)]". Századok (in Hungarian). 122 (1–2). Magyar Történelmi Társulat: 89–146. ISSN 0039-8098.
- Engel, Pál (1996). Magyarország világi archontológiája, 1301–1457, I. [Secular Archontology of Hungary, 1301–1457, Volume I] (in Hungarian). História, MTA Történettudományi Intézete. ISBN 963-8312-44-0.
- Engel, Pál; Lővei, Pál; Varga, Lívia (1981). "Gótikus sírkövek Máriavölgyről és Segesdről [Gothic Tombstones from Máriavölgy and Segesd]". Művészettörténeti Értesítő (in Hungarian). 30 (2): 140–144. ISSN 0027-5247.
- Karácsonyi, János (1900). A magyar nemzetségek a XIV. század közepéig. [The Hungarian genera until the middle of the 14th century] (in Hungarian). Hungarian Academy of Sciences.
- Kristó, Gyula (1979). A feudális széttagolódás Magyarországon [Feudal Anarchy in Hungary] (in Hungarian). Akadémiai Kiadó. ISBN 963-05-1595-4.
- Kristó, Gyula (2003). "I. Károly király harcai a tartományurak ellen (1310–1323) [The Struggles of Charles I Against the Oligarchs (1310–1323)]". Századok (in Hungarian). 137 (2). Magyar Történelmi Társulat: 297–347. ISSN 0039-8098.
- Markó, László (2006). A magyar állam főméltóságai Szent Istvántól napjainkig: Életrajzi Lexikon [Great Officers of State in Hungary from King Saint Stephen to Our Days: A Biographical Encyclopedia] (in Hungarian). Helikon Kiadó. ISBN 963-547-085-1.
- Nekić, Antun (2015). "The Oligarchs and the King in Medieval Slavonia, 1301–1342". Südost Forschungen. 74 (1): 1–25. ISSN 2364-9321.
- Zsoldos, Attila (2015). "A királyi hatalom és Szlavónia a 14. század első negyedében / Kraljevska vlast i Slavonija u prvoj četvrtini 14. stoljeća [The Royal Power and Slavonia in the First Quarter of the Fourteenth Century]". In Fodor, Pál; Sokcsevits, Dénes; Turkalj, Jasna; Karbić, Damir (eds.). A horvát-magyar együttélés fordulópontjai: Intézmények, társadalom, gazdaság, kultúra / Prekretnice u suživotu Hrvata i Mađara: Ustanove, društvo, gospodarstvo i kultura [Turning Points of the Croatian-Hungarian Co-habitation: Institutions, Society, Economy and Culture] (in Hungarian and Croatian). MTA Bölcsészettudományi Kutatóközpont Történettudományi Intézet, Hrvatski institut za povijest. pp. 126–136, 184–194. ISBN 978-963-416-019-9.

Nicholas I House of Felsőlendvai Born: ? Died: April or May 1325
Political offices
Preceded by John Babonić	Ban of Slavonia; 1323–1325	Succeeded by Mikcs Ákos
