= List of populated places in Hungary (I–Í) =

This is a list of cities, towns and villages of Hungary

KEY: T = Town ; V = Village

Name	Rank	County	District	Population	Post code
Ibafa	V	Baranya	Szigetvári	250	7935
Iborfia	V	Zala	Zalaegerszegi	22	8984
Ibrány	T	Szabolcs-Szatmár-Bereg	Ibrány–Nagyhalászi	6,897	4484
Igal	V	Somogy	Kaposvári	1,336	7275
Igar	V	Fejér	Sárbogárdi	1,141	7015
Igrici	V	Borsod-Abaúj-Zemplén	Mezocsáti	1,292	3459
Iharos	V	Somogy	Csurgói	528	8726
Iharosberény	V	Somogy	Csurgói	1,360	8725
Ikervár	V	Vas	Sárvári	1,905	9756
Iklad	V	Pest	Aszódi	2,109	2181
Iklanberény	V	Vas	Csepregi	42	9634
Iklódbördoce	V	Zala	Lenti	352	8958
Ikrény	V	Győr-Moson-Sopron	Győri	1,612	9141
Iliny	V	Nógrád	Balassagyarmati	197	2675
Ilk	V	Szabolcs-Szatmár-Bereg	Vásárosnaményi	1,263	4566
Illocska	V	Baranya	Siklósi	256	7775
Imola	V	Borsod-Abaúj-Zemplén	Kazincbarcikai	123	3724
Imrehegy	V	Bács-Kiskun	Kiskorösi	827	6238
Ináncs	V	Borsod-Abaúj-Zemplén	Encsi	1,250	3851
Inárcs	V	Pest	Dabasi	4,177	2365
Inke	V	Somogy	Csurgói	1,367	8724
Ipacsfa	V	Baranya	Siklósi	219	7847
Ipolydamásd	V	Pest	Szobi	375	2631
Ipolytarnóc	V	Nógrád	Salgótarjáni	571	3138
Ipolytölgyes	V	Pest	Szobi	466	2633
Ipolyvece	V	Nógrád	Balassagyarmati	894	2669
Iregszemcse	V	Tolna	Tamási	2,826	7095
Irota	V	Borsod-Abaúj-Zemplén	Edelényi	106	3786
Isaszeg	V	Pest	Gödölloi	10,518	2117
Ispánk	V	Vas	Oriszentpéteri	111	9941
Istenmezeje	V	Heves	Pétervásárai	3,279	3253
Istvándi	V	Somogy	Barcsi	641	7987
Iszkaszentgyörgy	V	Fejér	Székesfehérvári	1,884	8043
Iszkáz	V	Veszprém	Ajkai	399	8493
Isztimér	V	Fejér	Móri	963	8045
Ivád	V	Heves	Pétervásárai	1,194	3248
Iván	V	Győr-Moson-Sopron	Sopron–Fertodi	1,367	9374
Ivánbattyán	V	Baranya	Siklósi	156	7772
Ivánc	V	Vas	Oriszentpéteri	709	9931
Iváncsa	V	Fejér	Adonyi	2,882	2454
Ivándárda	V	Baranya	Mohácsi	255	7781
Izmény	V	Tolna	Bonyhádi	555	7353
Izsák	T	Bács-Kiskun	Kiskorösi	6,191	6070
Izsófalva	V	Borsod-Abaúj-Zemplén	Kazincbarcikai	1,912	3741

== Notes ==
- Cities marked with * have several different post codes, the one here is only the most general one.
