= Gutkeled (genus) =

Clan in the Kingdom of Hungary

The coat-of-arms of the Hungarian Gutkeled clan

Gutkeled (spelling variants: Gut-Keled, Guthkeled, Guth-Keled) was the name of a gens (Latin for "clan"; nemzetség in Hungarian) in the Kingdom of Hungary, to which a number of Hungarian noble families belong.

== History ==
The primary source of their origins is the Gesta Hungarorum of Simon of Kéza, in which the author writes:

Sed postea, tempore Petri regis Kelad et Gut intrant tres frateres ex gente Svevorum procreati. De castello Stof sunt nativi.
″But afterwards, during the reign of king Peter, Kelad and Gut three brothers of Swabian descent immigrated. They were born at the castle of Stof.″

The castle "Stof" is assumed to be a corruption of Stauf, meaning either the Staufen Castle in Staufen im Breisgau or the Hohenstaufen Castle in Göppingen. The king mentioned is Péter Orseolo, placing the arrival of the Gutkeleds to Hungary sometime around the 1040s.

== Noble families ==
Some of the Hungarian noble families descending from the Gutkeleds are:

- Adonyi
- Apagyi
- Atyai
- Báthory
- Benyó
- Daróczi
- Diószegi
- Dobi
- Gacsályi
- Guthi
- Jakcs
- Kenézy
- Kun
- Országs ( Horsák )
- Pelbárthidi
- Rozsályi
- Szemesi
- Maróthy
- Várdai

== Notable members ==
- Vid Gutkeled, King Solomon's chief advisor
- Apaj Gutkeled, Ban of Slavonia (1237–1239)
- Nicholas I Gutkeled, Ban of Slavonia (1240–1241), killed in the Battle of Mohi
- Stephen I Gutkeled, Ban of Slavonia (1248–1260)
- Nicholas II Gutkeled, Ban of Slavonia (1278–1279)
- Joachim Gutkeled, Ban of Slavonia (died in April 1277)
- Stephen II Gutkeled, Judge royal (1278–1279)
- Hodos Gutkeled, ispán of Zagreb County (1270–1272)
- Amadeus Gutkeled, ispán of Vas (1272–1273, 1275) and Zala counties (1276)

== Family trees ==
Rakamaz branch

- N.
  - N.
    - Hodos (fl. 1270–1291)
      - Ladislaus (fl. 1291–1310) → Szakolyi (Szokoli) family
      - Lawrence (fl. 1310–1338) → Rakamazi
    - Andrew ("the Bald")
      - Briccius (fl. 1276–1320) ∞ N. Nadabi → Báthory family
      - George (fl. 1276–1307) → Rakamazi de Encsencs
      - Benedict ("the Red"; fl. 1279–1321) → Rakamazi de Szaniszló
      - Catherine (fl. 1270–1311) ∞ Langeus, son of Vajda (d. before 1279)
    - Stephen (fl. 1310)
  - N.
    - Felician I
      - Michael (fl. 1310) → Zeleméri family
    - John I
      - Vid (fl. 1310)
      - Dominic (fl. 1310)
      - Felician II (fl. 1310) → Szalmadi family
    - Lucas
      - Felician III (fl. 1310)
      - John II ("the Muth"; fl. 1310)

Amadé branch

- Amadeus I ('the Black")
  - Lothard I (fl. 1262–1284) ∞ N. Atyusz (fl. +1262)
    - John
      - Amadeus III (fl. 1326–1380) → Amadé de Várkony family
      - Lothard II (fl. 1326–1380) → Várkonyi family
      - Nicholas II (fl. 1326–1376)
      - Stephen (Cletus; fl. 1326–1380) → Bősi family
  - Amadeus II (fl. 1272–1276; d. before 1286) ∞ N. (fl. 1286–1332)
    - Nicholas I (fl. 1292–1325†) ∞ N. Monoszló (fl. 1313) → Felsőlendvai family
  - Ampud (d. before 1290)
    - Bartholomew (fl. 1292–1325) → Marcaltövi family

Egyedmonostor branch

- N.
  - N.
    - Cosmas I ("the Great")
      - Cosmas II ("the Lesser"; fl. 1269–1321)
        - Ivánka II (fl. 1307–1312†) → Pelbárthidi family
        - Clara (fl. 1313) ∞ Emeric, son of Ivánka (fl. 1313)
        - Elizabeth (fl. 1308–1313) ∞ Artolf Keresztúri (d. before 1313)
    - Adony
      - Ivánka I (fl. 1278–1325) ∞ married twice → Adonyi (Jankafalvi) family
  - N.
    - Dorog
      - Peter I (fl. 1278–1284) → Hadházi family
      - Nicholas (fl. 1278–1304) → Diószegi family
      - Lawrence (fl. 1278–1297) → Dobi family
    - Sem
      - Lucas (fl. 1278)
        - Peter II (fl. 1296)

Sárvármonostor branch

- N.
  - N.
    - N.
      - Dragun
        - Stephen I (fl. 1242–1260†)
          - Nicholas II (fl. 1263–1291) → Majádi
            - Ladislaus (fl. 1278–1300)
            - John (fl. 1278–1300)
          - Joachim (fl. 1263–1277†) ∞ Maria Romanovna (m. 1269 or 1270)
            - Clara (fl. 1322–1337) ∞ Roland Borsa (d. 1301)
          - Stephen II (fl. 1263–1288; d. before 1291) ∞ unidentified (fl. 1300)
          - Paul (fl. 1263–1291)
            - Nicholas III (fl. 1300–1324) ∞ Barbara Somosi (fl. 1343) → Butkai family
            - Stephen III (fl. 1300–1343) → Málcai (Márki) family
            - Vid (fl. 1300–1334) → Ráskai family
            - daughter
      - Nicholas I
        - Paul I (fl. 1246–1270) → Szilágy sub-branch
          - Lothard (fl. 1272–1292)
            - Ladislaus I (fl. 1292)
              - Ladislaus II (fl. 1318)
            - James (fl. 1317–1318)
            - Paul II (fl. 1317–1318)
            - John (fl. 1317–1318)
          - Dominic (1282†)
    - N.
      - Apaj I (fl. 1229–1239)
        - Apaj II (fl. 1248–1270)
          - Apaj III (fl. 1274–1297)
            - Stephen (fl. 1297–1342; d. before 1346)
            - daughter ∞ Simon Kállai
          - Ekcs (fl. 1284–1293)
      - Nicholas (fl. 1229–1241†)
        - Andrew I ("the Great"; fl. 1250–1252)
          - Andrew II (fl. 1281–1312) → Bacskai (Bocskai) family
      - Csépán
        - Cletus (fl. 1250–1255; d. before 1265) ∞ unidentified (fl. 1265)
          - Peter (fl. 1272–1317)
          - Stephen (fl. 1272–1317) ∞ Elizabeth Szalánci → Bacskai (Anarcsi) family
  - N.
    - N.
      - Tiba I
        - Tiba II (fl. 1250–1253)
          - Nicholas (fl. 1270–1295)
            - Achilles (fl. 1310–1341) → Gacsályi family
            - Gregory (fl. 1314) → Rozsályi family
          - Tiba III (fl. 1280–1288)
            - Ladislaus (fl. 1313–1322)
            - Thomas (fl. 1313–1352)
            - John (fl. 1313–1322)
            - Peter (fl. 1313–1357) → Atyai (Zajtai, Salánki) family
          - Michael (fl. 1313–1322) → Apagyi family
    - N.
      - Pelbartus I (fl. 1216–1238) ∞ Ohudalov Tomaj
        - Pelbartus II (fl. 1250–1264; d. before 1280)
      - Michael
        - Ladislaus (fl. 1250)
        - Aladar (fl. 1250–1284)
          - Ladislaus (fl. 1284–1315) ∞ Margaret Pelejtei (fl. 1320–1325) → Várdai family
          - Pelbartus III (fl. 1284–1340; d. before 1341) ∞ Elizabeth Mátyfalvi (d. before 1326)
          - Elizabeth ∞ Ladislaus Fancsikai
          - Margaret ∞ Charles Apáti
        - John
          - Andrew (fl. 1280)
