= Zákányfalu =

- Village
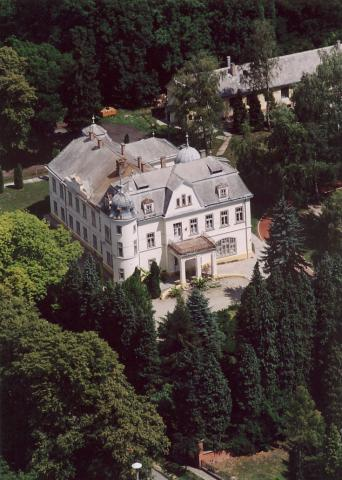
- Zichy Mansion in Zákányfalu

- Coat of arms

- Location of Gyöngyöspata in Hungary
- Coordinates: 46°16′1″N 16°57′33″E
- Country: Hungary
- Region: Southern Transdanubia
- County: Somogy
- District: Csurgó

Government
  - Mayor: Hajnalka Palotai

Area
  - Total: 7.09 km^{2} (2.74 sq mi)

Population (1 January 2016)
  - Total: 529
  - Density: 74.6/km^{2} (193/sq mi)
- Demonym(s): zákányfalui, zákányfalusi
- Time zone: UTC1 (CET)
  - Summer (DST): UTC+2 (CEST)
- Postal code: 8853
- Area code(s): 82
- NUTS 3 code: HU232
- MP: László Szászfalvi (KDNP)

Zákányfalu is a village in located in the Csurgó District of Somogy County, Hungary.

== History ==
Formerly part of Zákány, Zákányfalu became an independent village since October 20, 2002. The northern part of the settlement took up the name Zákányfalu. In the village there were 537 people in 2007 and a total of 238 apartments.
