= Csurgónagymarton =

- Village
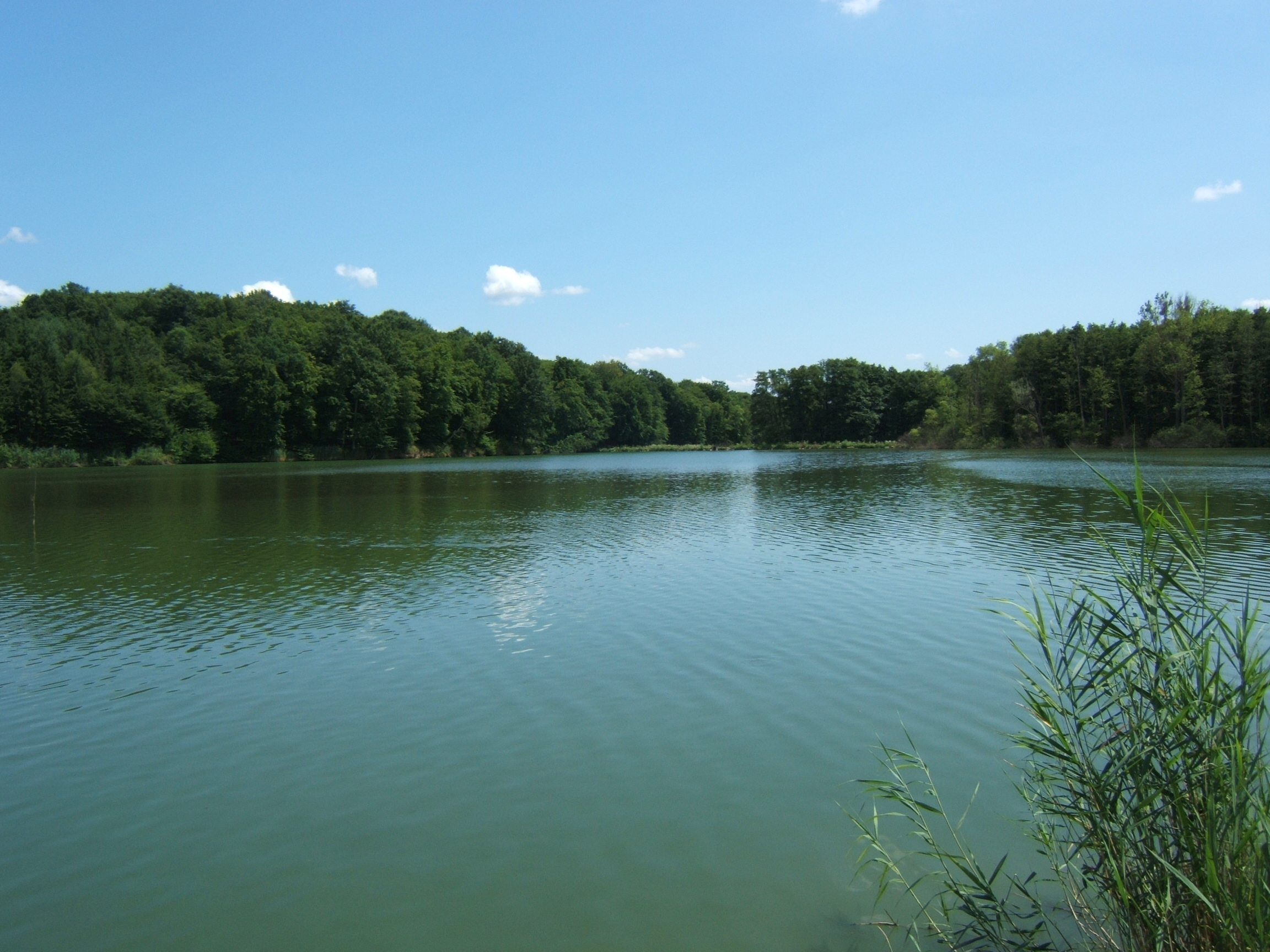
- Lake Ágneslak in Csurgónagymarton

- Coat of arms

- Location of Somogy county in Hungary

- Location of Csurgónagymarton
- Coordinates: 46.295380°N 17.081080°E
- Country: Hungary
- Region: Southern Transdanubia
- County: Somogy
- District: Csurgó
- RC Diocese: Kaposvár

Area
  - Total: 14.82 km^{2} (5.72 sq mi)

Population (2022)
  - Total: 160
  - Density: 11/km^{2} (28/sq mi)
- Demonym(s): nagymartoni, csurgónagymartoni
- Time zone: UTC+1 (CET)
  - Summer (DST): UTC+2 (CEST)
- Postal code: 8840
- Area code: (+36) 82
- Patron Saint: Stephen I
- NUTS 3 code: HU232
- MP: László Szászfalvi (KDNP)

Csurgónagymarton is a village in Somogy county, Hungary.
