= Porrogszentkirály =

Porrogszentkirály Porog (in Slovene) Sekral (in Croatian)
- Village
- Coat of arms

- Location of Somogy county in Hungary

- Location of Porrogszentkirály
- Coordinates: 46.27539°N 17.04210°E
- Country: Hungary
- Region: Southern Transdanubia
- County: Somogy
- District: Csurgó
- RC Diocese: Kaposvár

Area
  - Total: 13.65 km^{2} (5.27 sq mi)

Population (2017)
  - Total: 262
  - Density: 19.2/km^{2} (49.7/sq mi)
- Demonym(s): szentkirályi, porrogszentkirályi
- Time zone: UTC+1 (CET)
  - Summer (DST): UTC+2 (CEST)
- Postal code: 8858
- Area code: (+36) 82
- Patron Saint: Stephen I
- NUTS 3 code: HU232
- MP: László Szászfalvi (KDNP)
- Website: Porrogszentkirály Online

Porrogszentkirály (Slovene: Porog, Croatian: Sekral) is a village in Somogy County, Hungary where the Somogy Slovenes still live.

== Etymology ==
According to the local legends Ladislaus I of Hungary came in the area once and a nail fell out of the wheel of his chariot. A cottar noticed it and put his finger in the hole. The king asked him where he lives. But he could not tell him because his village had no name. So the village got the name Szentkirály (English: Saint king).

The scientific explanation states that it was named after the patron of its church, Saint Stephen of Hungary, the first saint among the Hungarian kings, like Rinyaszentkirály.
