= Somogyudvarhely =

Somogyudvarhely Dvorišče (in Croatian)
- Village
- Coat of arms

- Location of Somogy county in Hungary

- Location of Somogyudvarhely
- Coordinates: 46.17631°N 17.18789°E
- Country: Hungary
- Region: Southern Transdanubia
- County: Somogy
- District: Csurgó
- RC Diocese: Kaposvár

Area
  - Total: 40.42 km^{2} (15.61 sq mi)

Population (2017)
  - Total: 967
  - Density: 23.9/km^{2} (62.0/sq mi)
- Demonym(s): udvarhelyi, somogyudvarhelyi
- Time zone: UTC+1 (CET)
  - Summer (DST): UTC+2 (CEST)
- Postal code: 7515
- Area code: (+36) 82
- NUTS 3 code: HU232
- MP: László Szászfalvi (KDNP)
- Website: Somogyudvarhely Online

Somogyudvarhely (Croatian: Dvorišče) is a village in Somogy county, Hungary.
