= Baldwin I Rátót =

Hungarian nobleman

Baldwin (I) Rátót

Master of the cupbearers
- Reign: 1233–1234; 1235–1238; 1247–1254
- Predecessor: Stephen Csák (1st and 2nd term); Maurice Pok (3rd term)
- Successor: Alexander Hont-Pázmány (1st term); Lawrence (2nd term); Conrad Győr (3rd term)
- Born: Unknown
- Died: after 1255
- Noble family: gens Rátót
- Issue: Julius II; Stephen II; Baldwin II
- Father: Rathold

Baldwin (I) from the kindred Rátót (Hungarian: Rátót nembeli (I.) Balduin; died after 1255) was a Hungarian distinguished nobleman from the gens Rátót, who served as master of the cupbearers three times. His father was Rathold Rátót, ispán (comes) of Somogy County in 1203. His older brother was Dominic I Rátót.

He served as master of the cupbearers between 1233 and 1234. After that he functioned as ispán of Moson County in 1235. He was appointed master of the cupbearers for the second time in 1235, a position which he held until 1238. He was ispán of Vas County from 1240 to 1244. After that he functioned as ispán of Nyitra County in 1244. He served as master of the cupbearers for the third time between 1247 and 1254, besides that he held the office of ispán of Bánya from 1247 to 1251. He finished his career as ispán of Vas County in 1255.

== Sources ==
- (in Hungarian) Zsoldos, Attila (2011). Magyarország világi archontológiája, 1000–1301 ("Secular Archontology of Hungary, 1000–1301"). História, MTA Történettudományi Intézete. Budapest. ISBN 978-963-9627-38-3

Baldwin I Genus Rátót Born: ? Died: after 1255
Political offices
| Preceded by Stephen Csák | Master of the cupbearers 1233–1234 | Succeeded by Alexander Hont-Pázmány |
| Preceded by Stephen Csák | Master of the cupbearers 1235–1238 | Succeeded by Lawrence |
| Preceded by Maurice Pok | Master of the cupbearers 1247–1254 | Succeeded by Conrad Győr |
