= Somogybükkösd =

Somogybükkösd Bikežda (in Croatian)
- Village
- Coat of arms

- Location of Somogy county in Hungary

- Location of Somogybükkösd
- Coordinates: 46.30128°N 16.99054°E
- Country: Hungary
- Region: Southern Transdanubia
- County: Somogy
- District: Csurgó
- RC Diocese: Kaposvár

Area
  - Total: 11.8 km^{2} (4.6 sq mi)

Population (2017)
  - Total: 63
  - Density: 5.3/km^{2} (14/sq mi)
- Demonym(s): bükkösdi, somogybükkösdi
- Time zone: UTC+1 (CET)
  - Summer (DST): UTC+2 (CEST)
- Postal code: 8858
- Area code: (+36) 82
- NUTS 3 code: HU232
- MP: László Szászfalvi (KDNP)
- Website: Somogybükkösd Online

Somogybükkösd (Croatian: Bikežda) is a village in Somogy county, Hungary.
