= Somogycsicsó =

Somogycsicsó Čičovec (in Croatian)
- Village
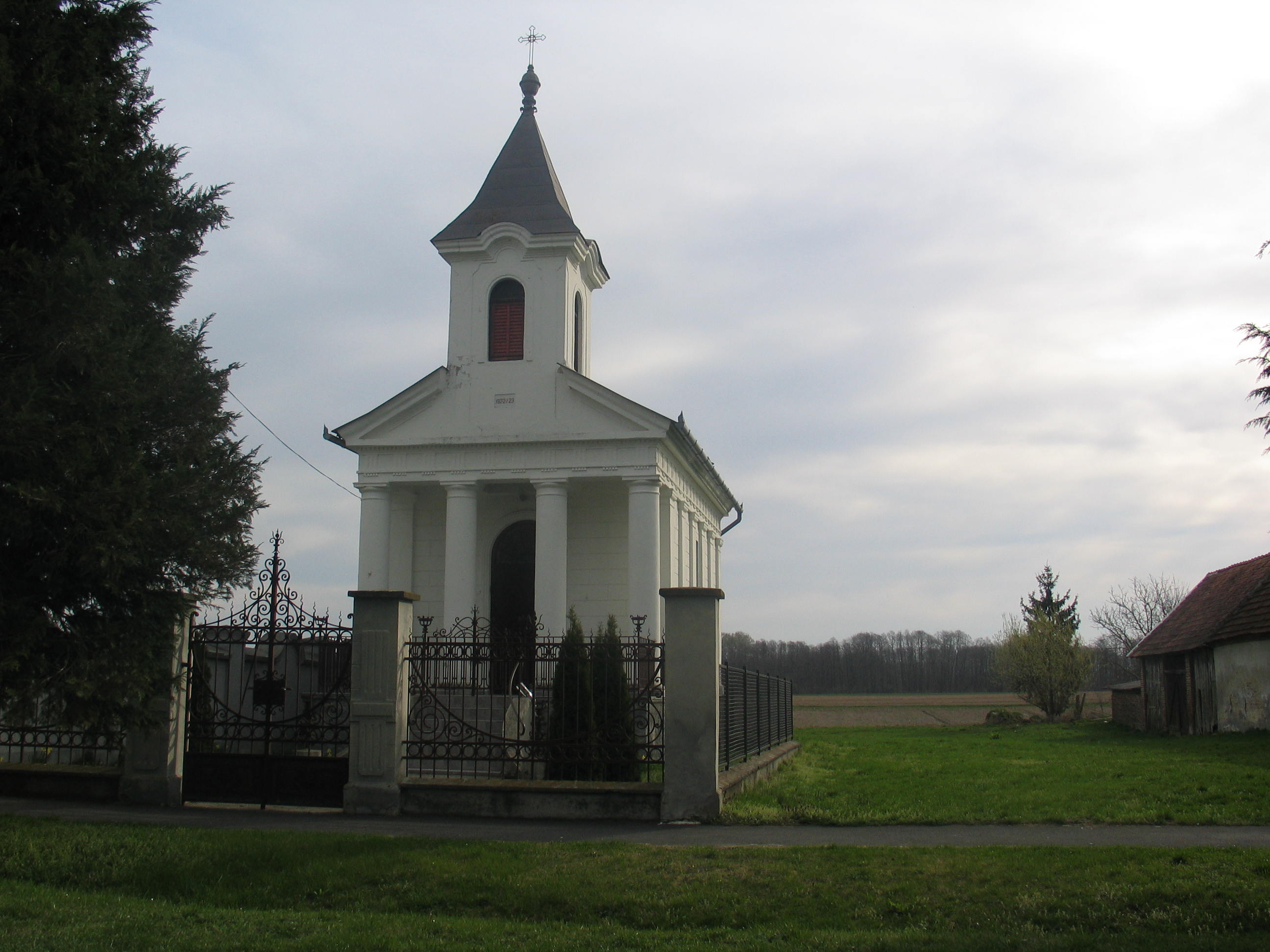
- Szent Vendel-templom (English: Saint Wendelin Church) in Somogycsicsó

- Coat of arms

- Location of Somogy county in Hungary

- Location of Somogycsicsó
- Coordinates: 46.30972°N 17.13269°E
- Country: Hungary
- Region: Southern Transdanubia
- County: Somogy
- District: Csurgó
- RC Diocese: Kaposvár

Area
  - Total: 12.19 km^{2} (4.71 sq mi)

Population (2017)
  - Total: 145
  - Density: 11.9/km^{2} (30.8/sq mi)
- Demonym(s): csicsói, somogycsicsói
- Time zone: UTC+1 (CET)
  - Summer (DST): UTC+2 (CEST)
- Postal code: 8726
- Area code: (+36) 82
- Patron Saint: Wendelin of Trier
- NUTS 3 code: HU232
- MP: László Szászfalvi (KDNP)
- Website: Somogycsicsó Online

Somogycsicsó (Croatian: Čičovec) is a village in Somogy county, Hungary.
