= Baldwin II Rátót =

Baldwin (II) Rátót

Ispán of Zala
- Reign: 1275–1276; 1276
- Predecessor: Denis Péc (1st term); Amadeus Gutkeled (2nd term)
- Successor: Amadeus Gutkeled (1st term); Stephen (2nd term)
- Born: Unknown
- Died: after 1283
- Noble family: gens Rátót
- Issue: Lawrence Rátóti
- Father: Baldwin I

Baldwin (II) from the kindred Rátót (Hungarian: Rátót nembeli (II.) Balduin; died after 1283) was a Hungarian distinguished nobleman from the gens Rátót as the son of Baldwin I Rátót, who served as ispán (comes) of Zala County from 1275 to 1276 and in 1276.

His older brother was Julius II Rátót. Baldwin's only son, Lawrence was the ancestor of the Rátóti and Gyulaffy de Rátót noble families.

== Sources ==
- (in Hungarian) Zsoldos, Attila (2011). Magyarország világi archontológiája, 1000–1301 ("Secular Archontology of Hungary, 1000–1301"). História, MTA Történettudományi Intézete. Budapest. ISBN 978-963-9627-38-3

Baldwin II Genus Rátót Born: ? Died: after 1283
Political offices
| Preceded by Denis Péc | Ispán of Zala; 1275–1276 | Succeeded by Amadeus Gutkeled |
| Preceded by Amadeus Gutkeled | Ispán of Zala; 1276 | Succeeded by Stephen |
