= Pogányszentpéter =

- Village
- Coat of arms

- Location of Somogy county in Hungary

- Location of Pogányszentpéter
- Coordinates: 46.38307°N 17.06125°E
- Country: Hungary
- Region: Southern Transdanubia
- County: Somogy
- District: Csurgó
- RC Diocese: Kaposvár

Area
  - Total: 13.15 km^{2} (5.08 sq mi)

Population (2017)
  - Total: 486
  - Density: 37.0/km^{2} (95.7/sq mi)
- Demonym(s): szentpéteri, pogányszentpéteri
- Time zone: UTC+1 (CET)
  - Summer (DST): UTC+2 (CEST)
- Postal code: 8728
- Area code: (+36) 82
- Patron Saint: Saint Peter
- NUTS 3 code: HU232
- MP: László Szászfalvi (KDNP)
- Website: Pogányszentpéter Online

Pogányszentpéter is a village in Somogy county, Hungary.
