= Rathold Rátót =

Hungarian nobleman

Rathold (I) Rátót

Ispán of Somogy
- Reign: 1203
- Predecessor: Ban
- Successor: Mercurius
- Noble family: gens Rátót
- Spouse: Unknown
- Issue: Dominic I Baldwin I Matthias (?)
- Father: Leustach I

Rathold (I) from the kindred Rátót (Hungarian: Rátót nembeli (I.) Rátót (Ratolt)) was a Hungarian distinguished nobleman from the gens Rátót, who served as ispán (comes) of Somogy County in 1203.

He was the eldest son of voivode Leustach Rátót. As his brother, Julius I Rátót had no successors, Rathold was the ancestor of the Gyulafi branch of the Rátót clan.

== Sources ==
- (in Hungarian) Zsoldos, Attila (2011). Magyarország világi archontológiája, 1000–1301 ("Secular Archontology of Hungary, 1000–1301"). História, MTA Történettudományi Intézete. Budapest. ISBN 978-963-9627-38-3

Political offices
Preceded by Ban	Ispán of Somogy; 1203	Succeeded by Mercurius
