= Csurgó District =

Csurgó District Csurgói járás
- Districts of Hungary
- Coat of arms

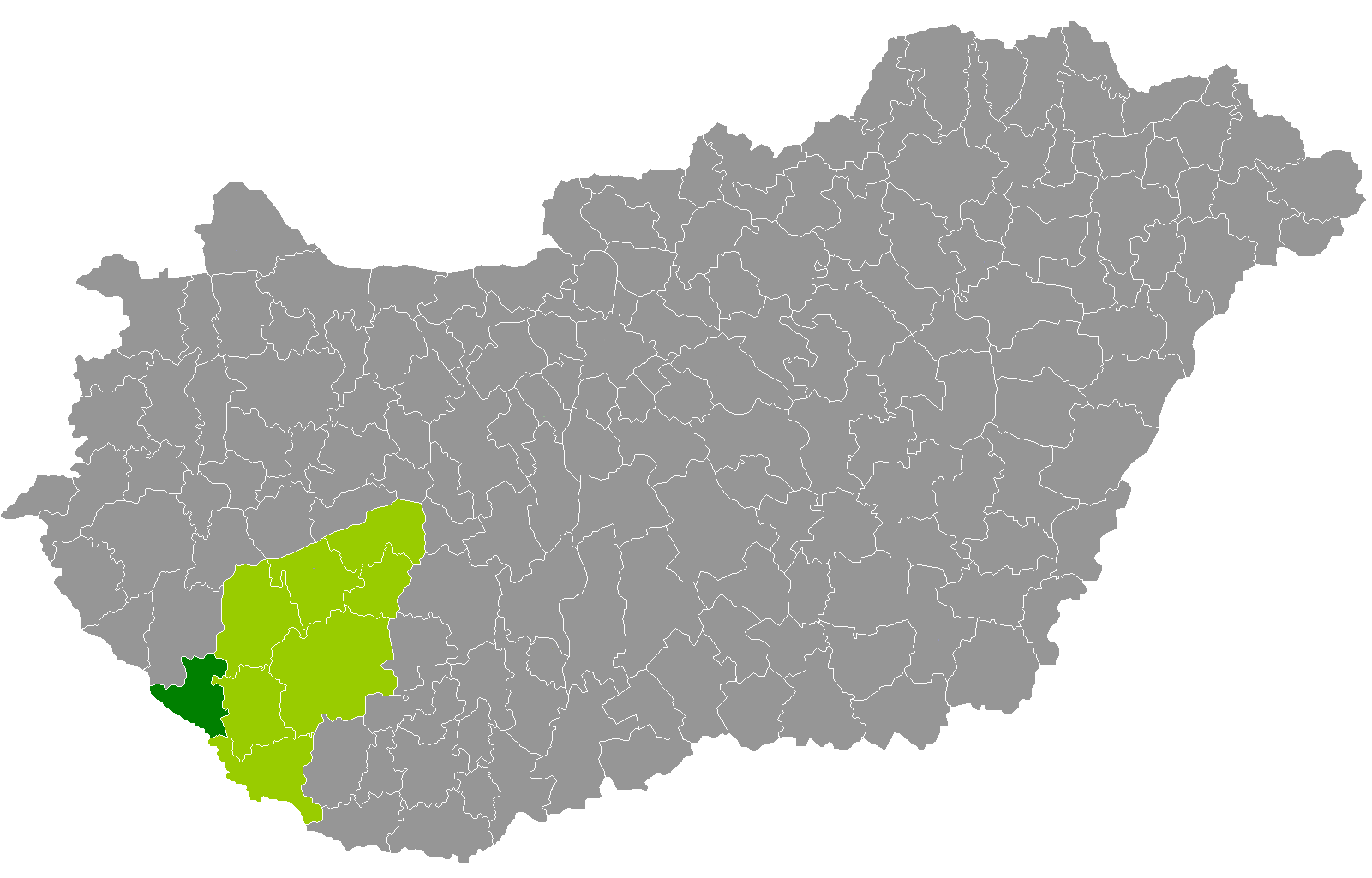
- Csurgó District within Hungary and Somogy County.
- Coordinates: 46.26°N 17.10°E
- Country: Hungary
- Region: Southern Transdanubia
- County: Somogy
- District seat: Csurgó

Area
  - Total: 496.19 km^{2} (191.58 sq mi)
  - Rank: 7th in Somogy

Population (2011 census)
  - Total: 16,862
  - Rank: 7th in Somogy
  - Density: 34/km^{2} (88/sq mi)

Csurgó (Hungarian: Csurgói járás) is a district in south-western part of Somogy County, Hungary. Csurgó is also the name of the town where the district seat is located. The district is in the Southern Transdanubia Statistical Region.

== Geography ==
Csurgó District borders with Nagykanizsa District (Zala County) to the north, Marcali District and Nagyatád District to the east, Barcs District to the southeast, the Croatian county of Koprivnica-Križevci to the southwest. The number of the inhabited places in Csurgó District is 18.

== Municipalities ==
The district has 1 town, 1 large village and 16 villages. (ordered by population, as of 1 January 2013)

- Berzence (2,602)
- **Csurgó** (5,229) – district seat
- Csurgónagymarton (154)
- Gyékényes (988)
- Iharos (460)
- Iharosberény (1,271)
- Inke (1,233)
- Őrtilos (474)
- Pogányszentpéter (493)
- Porrog (230)
- Porrogszentkirály (278)
- Porrogszentpál (79)
- Somogybükkösd (85)
- Somogycsicsó (165)
- Somogyudvarhely (1,025)
- Szenta (388)
- Zákány (1,098)
- Zákányfalu (555)

The bolded municipality is city, italics municipality is large village.

== See also ==
- List of cities and towns in Hungary
