= Nicholas I Gutkeled =

Nicholas (I) Gutkeled
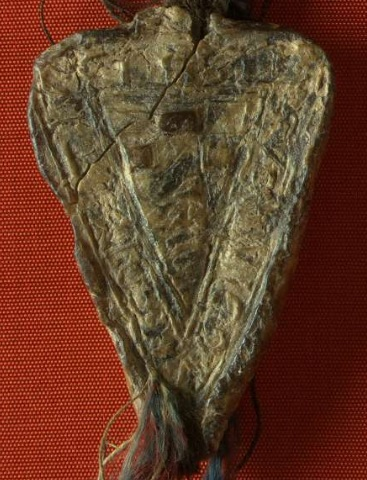
- Seal of Nicholas Gutkeled, 1240

Ban of Slavonia
- Reign: 1240–1241
- Predecessor: Apaj Gutkeled
- Successor: Denis Türje
- Died: 11 April 1241; Battle of Mohi
- Noble family: gens Gutkeled
- Issue: Andrew

Nicholas (I) from the kindred Gutkeled (Hungarian: Gutkeled nembeli (I.) Miklós; died 11 April 1241) was a Hungarian baron in the first third of the 13th century, who served as Ban of Slavonia from 1239 or 1240 to 1241, during the reign of Béla IV of Hungary. He was killed in the Battle of Mohi.

== Family ==
Nicholas was born into the Sárvármonostor branch of the powerful gens (clan) Gutkeled. His parentage is unknown. His brothers were Apaj and Csépán. One of his cousins was Dragun, progenitor of the Majád branch. Nicholas and his unidentified wife had a son Andrew "the Great", progenitor of the Bocskai de Keresztúr and Bocskai de Büssü noble families, which kinship is not identical with the family of Stephen Bocskai, Prince of Transylvania, who descended from the clan Baksa.

== Career ==
Similarly to his brothers, Nicholas possessed lands in the area between Legrad and Rasinja in Slavonia (present-day in Croatia). Nicholas was a confidant of Prince Coloman, who held the title of Duke of Slavonia since 1226. Nicholas served as ispán of Zala County from 1229 to 1234; the territory then belonged to Coloman's realm. He was referred to as treasurer of the ducal court from 1237 to 1240. Following the plausible death of his brother Apaj, Nicholas was appointed Ban of Slavonia in 1239 or 1240. Alongside his lord, he fought in the Battle of Mohi against the Mongol invaders on 11 April 1241. He was killed in the battlefield.

His only known son Andrew (I) was styled as patron of the Sárvár family monastery in 1250, then patron of the provostry of Lelesz (present-day Leles, Slovakia) in 1252. He acquired the village Báka in Szabolcs County. His son, Andrew (II) lived in Báka. He handed over his estate Ásvány in Ung County (today Tysaashvan in Ukraine) to Thomas Baksa as a compensation in 1286, because he killed one of Thomas' priests and robbed another one servant. Since the 1290s, he resided in Bacska (today Bačka, Slovakia). Subsequently, his descendants bore the family name Bacskai later Bocskai.

== Sources ==
- Karácsonyi, János (1901). A magyar nemzetségek a XIV. század közepéig. II. kötet [The Hungarian genera until the middle of the 14th century, Vol. 2] (in Hungarian). Hungarian Academy of Sciences.
- Markó, László (2006). A magyar állam főméltóságai Szent Istvántól napjainkig: Életrajzi Lexikon [Great Officers of State in Hungary from King Saint Stephen to Our Days: A Biographical Encyclopedia] (in Hungarian). Helikon Kiadó. ISBN 963-208-970-7.
- Zsoldos, Attila (2011). Magyarország világi archontológiája, 1000–1301 [Secular Archontology of Hungary, 1000–1301] (in Hungarian). História, MTA Történettudományi Intézete. ISBN 978-963-9627-38-3.

Nicholas I Genus Gutkeled Born: ? Died: 11 April 1241
Political offices
| Preceded by Apaj Gutkeled | Ban of Slavonia; 1240–1241 | Succeeded by Denis Türje |
