= Porrogszentpál =

Porrogszentpál Porog - Sveti Pavel (in Slovene) Supal (in Croatian)
- Village
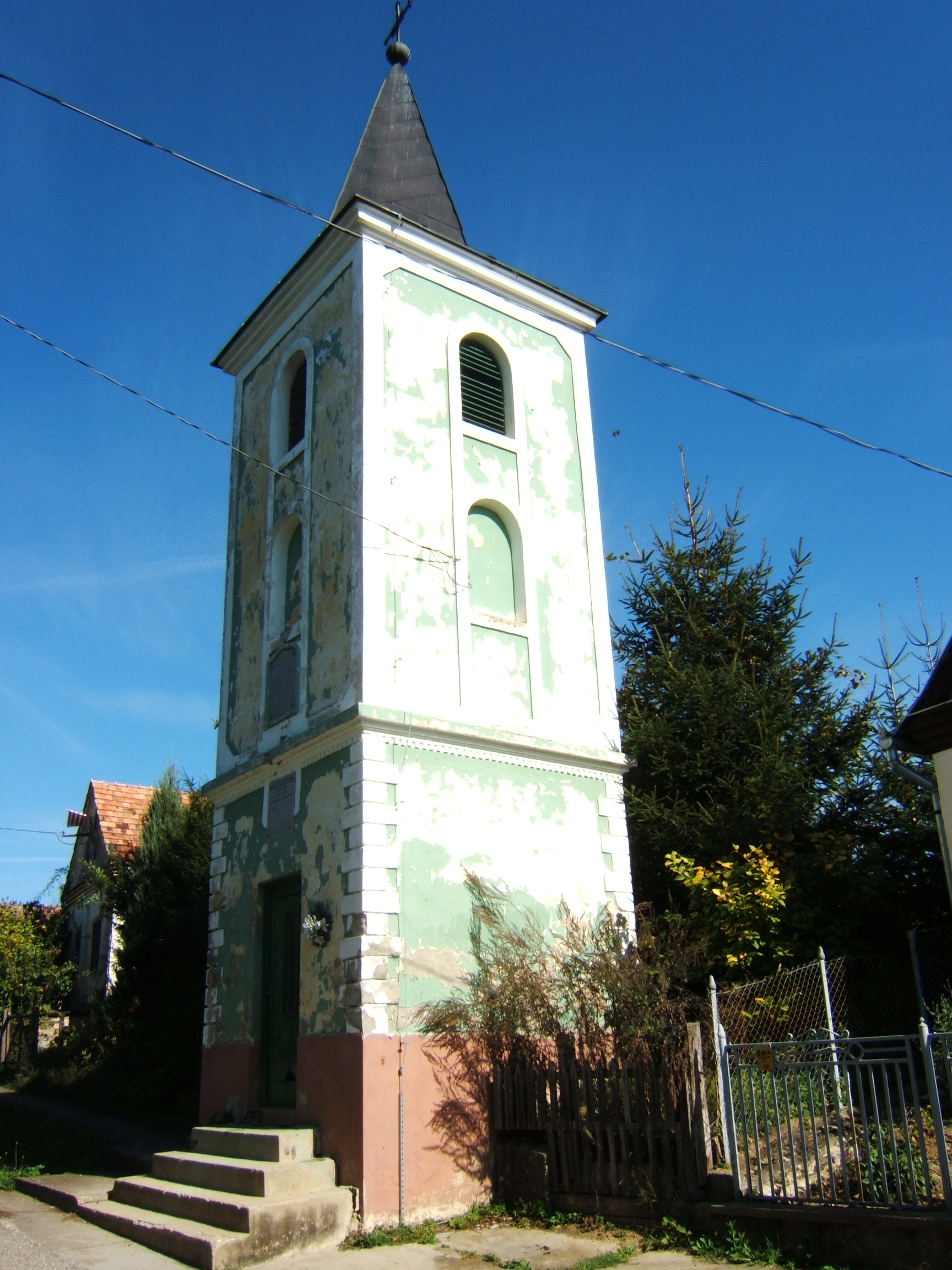
- The bell tower in Porrogszentpál

- Coat of arms

- Location of Somogy county in Hungary

- Location of Porrogszentpál
- Coordinates: 46.28616°N 17.01493°E
- Country: Hungary
- Region: Southern Transdanubia
- County: Somogy
- District: Csurgó
- RC Diocese: Kaposvár

Area
  - Total: 3.54 km^{2} (1.37 sq mi)

Population (2017)
  - Total: 86
  - Density: 24/km^{2} (63/sq mi)
- Demonym(s): szentpáli, porrogszentpáli
- Time zone: UTC+1 (CET)
  - Summer (DST): UTC+2 (CEST)
- Postal code: 8858
- Area code: (+36) 82
- Patron Saint: Paul the Apostle
- NUTS 3 code: HU232
- MP: László Szászfalvi (KDNP)

Porrogszentpál (Slovene: Porog - Sveti Pavel, Croatian: Supal) is a village in Somogy County, Hungary, where Somogy Slovenes live.
