= Őrtilos =

Őrtilos Tiluš / Tiloš (in Croatian)
- Village
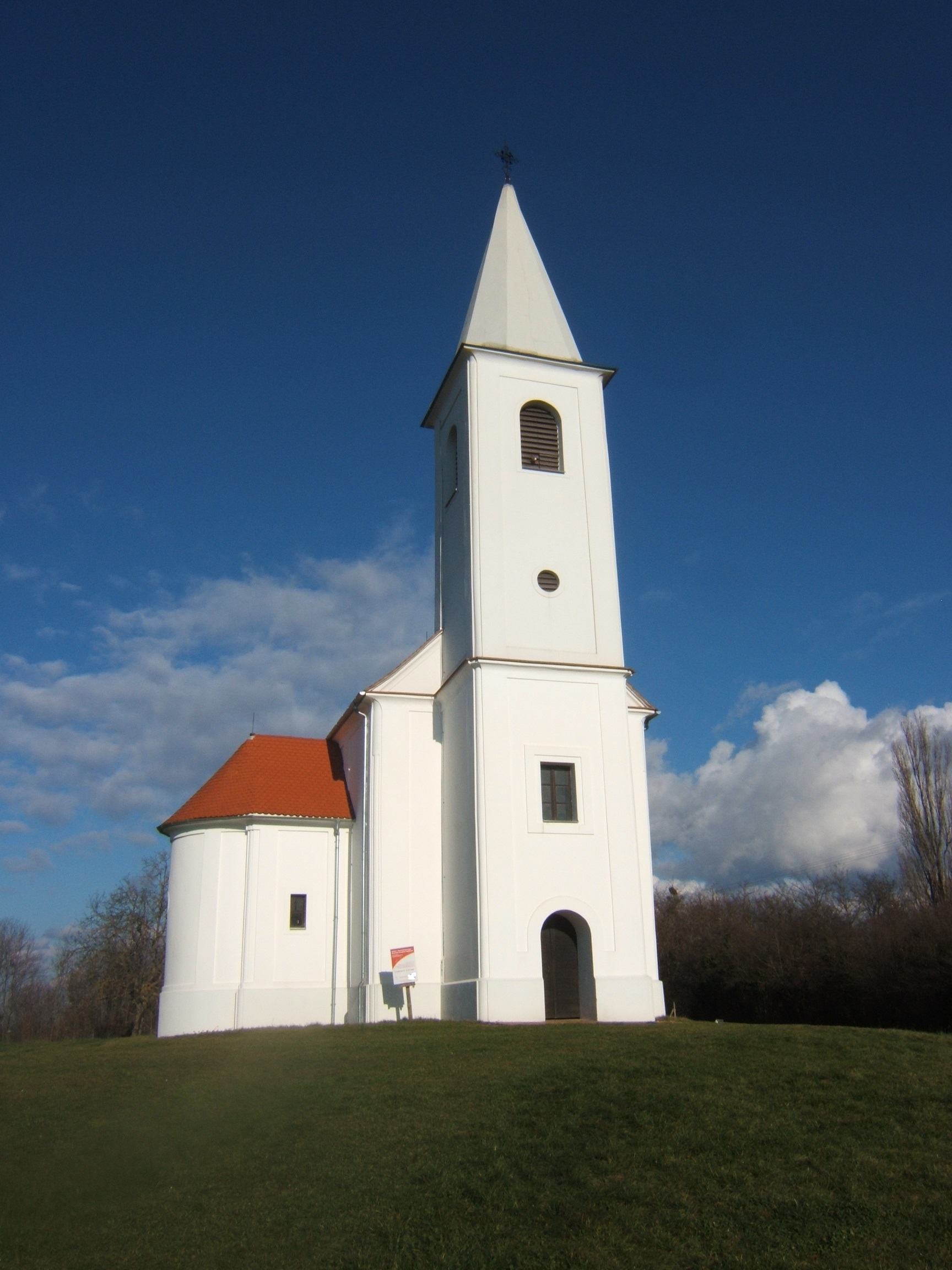
- Church of Szentmihályhegy in Őrtilos

- Coat of arms

- Location of Somogy county in Hungary

- Location of Őrtilos
- Coordinates: 46.28318°N 16.92409°E
- Country: Hungary
- Region: Southern Transdanubia
- County: Somogy
- District: Csurgó
- RC Diocese: Kaposvár

Area
  - Total: 21.12 km^{2} (8.15 sq mi)

Population (2017)
  - Total: 431
  - Density: 20.4/km^{2} (52.9/sq mi)
- Demonym: őrtilosi
- Time zone: UTC+1 (CET)
  - Summer (DST): UTC+2 (CEST)
- Postal code: 8854
- Area code: (+36) 82
- NUTS 3 code: HU232
- MP: László Szászfalvi (KDNP)
- Website: Őrtilos Online

Őrtilos (Croatian: Tiluš / Tiloš) is the westernmost village of Somogy county, Hungary.

== Etymology ==
Its former name was Őr (English: guard). The tilos (English: not allowed, forbidden, banned) came in the 19th century into the name.
