= Cosmas Gutkeled =

- Died: after 1321
- Noble family: gens Gutkeled
- Issue: Ivánka; Clara; Elizabeth
- Father: Cosmas "the Great"

Cosmas from the kindred Gutkeled (also known as Cosmas the Lesser; Hungarian: Gutkeled nembeli "Kis" Kozma; died after 1321) was a Hungarian nobleman and soldier in the second half of the 13th century and early 14th century.

== Family ==
Cosmas "the Lesser" was born into the Egyedmonostor branch of the powerful gens (clan) Gutkeled as the only known son of Cosmas "the Great". From his marriage with an unidentified lady, he had three children. His son Ivánka was progenitor of the Pelbárthidi (or Jankafalvi) family. He was killed in the Battle of Rozgony in 1312. His two daughters were Clara and Elizabeth.

== Life and career ==
As a young noble, Cosmas supported rex iunior Stephen in his conflict against his father, King Béla IV of Hungary, since his clan's landholdings laid mostly in the eastern part of the kingdom, where Stephen administered. When the civil war broke out in late 1264, Stephen and his entourage were rapidly forced to retreat as far as the castle at Feketehalom (Codlea, Romania) in the easternmost corner of Transylvania. When the royal army began to besiege the fort, Cosmas was among the handful of defenders until the arrival of Stephen's relief army in January 1265. Still in that year following their victory, Elizabeth the Cuman, the spouse of Stephen, donated the queenly estate Ragáld along the river Ér (Ier) for his loyalty and service at Feketehalom. In 1268 or 1269, Stephen himself confirmed the donation and, in addition, he granted Nyék in Bihar County and Harangod in Szabolcs County, for the same reason. Later, in 1282, both Ladislaus IV of Hungary and Isabella of Sicily confirmed the donations.

Following Stephen V's ascension to the Hungarian throne in 1270, the king granted Küngös in Veszprém County to Cosmas. After 1270, Cosmas entered the service of his distant relative Joachim Gutkeled, a powerful lord of the era. Sometime between 1272 and 1277, Joachim donated the estate Vadaszt or Pelbárthida in Bihar County (present-day Parhida in Tămășeu, Romania) to Cosmas. Joachim also requested King Ladislaus to confirm the donation. Thereafter, Cosmas built a manor there and Pelbárthida became the main residence of his family. He was involved in a long-lasting lawsuit with the Várdai branch of the Gutkeled clan over the possession; before Joachim, it was possessed by the eponymous owner Pelbart (II) from that branch, who built a bridge there (Pelbárthida, lit. "Pelbart's Bridge"). In 1297, Cosmas presented the aforementioned royal charters (1265, c. 1269, 1288) to prove his legal ownership, which the court recognized. As a compensation, Cosmas handed over an annual income of the river customs duties in Pelbárthida to the Várdais. Nevertheless, the lawsuit continued in 1299 and 1300 too.

Cosmas fought in the Bohemian–Hungarian war in 1273. As a familiaris of Joachim, he was present during the siege of Győr where he was seriously injured. He took part in the Battle on the Marchfeld in August 1278. He captured the castellan of Burun and Suerchen and delivered the prisoner to the royal tent during the clash. For his service and loyalty, Ladislaus IV donated the land of royal stablemen in Küngös, in addition to the surrounding ducal and queenly estates to Cosmas in September 1287.

Cosmas, alongside several other members of his kinship, was ius patron of the Egyed monastery (since 1275, the duty was rotated between each other every year). In 1278, Cosmas and his cousin Ivánka protested against their relatives, the sons of Dorog, who arbitrarily seized the monastery and they rebuilt it into a fortress and a tower. In the 1280s, he and his cousin Ivánka were involved in series of conflicts against the Hont-Pázmány clan in Bihar County. Around 1282, his troops plundered a village possessed by Mikó and Csépán from that kindred. Cosmas compensated them for the damage and reconciled with them in 1284. Around 1285, Albert Hont-Pázmány hired Cumans to attack and pillage Kágya (Cadea, present-day in Săcueni, Romania), Cosmas' village. Ivánka chased the invaders, but he was defeated in the clash and three of his men were killed. Cosmas was embroiled in conflict with Benedict, Bishop of Várad in the 1290s too, causing mutual harm to each other. In 1291, he bought Léta along the river Berettyó (Barcău) for 25 silver marks. Cosmas was involved in lawsuit with local nobles in Reszege (Resighea in Pișcolt, Romania) in 1299. Due to the violent nature of his son, Ivánka, he was in litigation with the local nobles (e.g. Dózsa Debreceni) in the early 14th century. When Ivánka attempted to sold his portion in Pelbárthida, Cosmas filed a legal complaint against him in 1310. Cosmas and his cousin Ivánka divided their estates during a contract in 1307. Accordingly, Cosmas was granted half portion of Dorog or Darázsfalu in Sopron County (present-day Trausdorf an der Wulka, Austria), a portion in Kőhídpordány (Wulkaprodersdorf) and the entire village Harangfalu in Szabolcs County. Their descendants gradually sold their interests in the remote Majád lordship in Western Transdanubia.

During era of Interregnum in the early 14th century, Cosmas and his family supported the claim of Charles of Anjou. Cosmas and Ivánka took part in various campaigns during that time. Ivánka, his only son, was killed in the Battle of Rozgony in 1312. Thereafter, Charles I granted the right of free testament to Cosmas in June 1313, so that after his death his estates would not automatically escheated to the crown. Cosmas was also granted the customs of Reszege in the same time. He presented his royal exemptions in Szalacs (Sălacea) in 1317. He is last mentioned as a living person in 1321. His wealth was inherited by his grandson John, the first member of the Pelbárthidi family.

== Sources ==
- Karácsonyi, János (1900). A magyar nemzetségek a XIV. század közepéig. [The Hungarian genera until the middle of the 14th century] (in Hungarian). Hungarian Academy of Sciences.
- Kiss-Komjáthy, Andor (2023). ""Qui nec ediem regi, nec regno Ungarie fidelis existit". Gutkeled nembeli Joachim személye és szerepe ["Qui nec ediem regi, nec regno Ungarie fidelis existit". The Person and Role of Joachim Gutkeled]". Fons. 30 (3). Szentpétery Imre Történettudományi Alapítvány: 273–310. ISSN 1217-8020.
- Rudolf, Veronika (2023). Közép-Európa a hosszú 13. században [Central Europe in the Long 13th Century] (in Hungarian). Arpadiana XV., Research Centre for the Humanities. ISBN 978-963-416-406-7.
- Zsoldos, Attila (2007). Családi ügy: IV. Béla és István ifjabb király viszálya az 1260-as években [A family affair: The Conflict between Béla IV and Junior King Stephen in the 1260s] (in Hungarian). História, MTA Történettudományi Intézete. ISBN 978-963-9627-15-4.
