= Szenta =

- Village
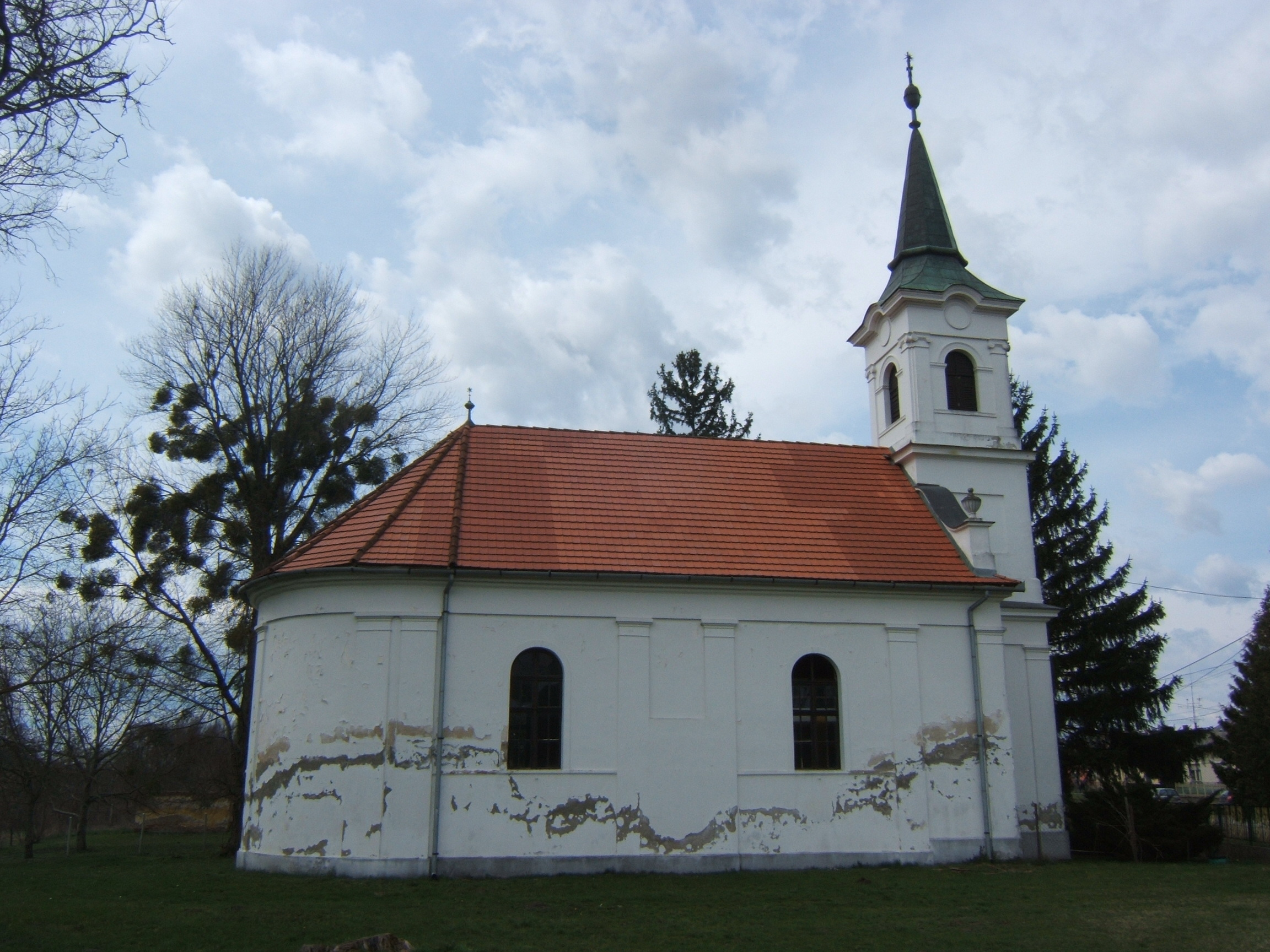
- Reformed Church in Szenta

- Coat of arms

- Location of Somogy county in Hungary

- Location of Szenta
- Coordinates: 46.25163°N 17.17223°E
- Country: Hungary
- Region: Southern Transdanubia
- County: Somogy
- District: Csurgó
- RC Diocese: Kaposvár

Area
  - Total: 64.47 km^{2} (24.89 sq mi)

Population (2017)
  - Total: 375
  - Density: 5.82/km^{2} (15.1/sq mi)
- Demonym: szentai
- Time zone: UTC+1 (CET)
  - Summer (DST): UTC+2 (CEST)
- Postal code: 8849
- Area code: (+36) 82
- NUTS 3 code: HU232
- MP: László Szászfalvi (KDNP)

Szenta is a village in Somogy county, Hungary.
