= Stephen Csák, Ban of Severin =

Hungarian nobleman

Stephen Csák

Ban of Severin
- Reign: 1243
- Predecessor: Osl Osl
- Successor: Lawrence, son of Kemény (1260)
- Born: 1200s
- Died: after 1269
- Noble family: gens Csák
- Spouse: N Győr
- Issue: Emeric
- Father: Csák

Stephen from the kindred Csák (Hungarian: Csák nembeli István; died after 1269) was a Hungarian baron and military leader in the 13th century. He was a confidant of King Béla IV of Hungary since his heir years to the throne. He led the Hungarian army to victory against the Serbs, who invaded the Duchy of Macsó in 1268.

== Family ==
Stephen was born into an unidentified branch of the powerful and wealthy gens (clan) Csák, as the son of Csák, who was a confidant of Duke Béla in the 1220s, then served as ispán of Sopron County from 1235 to 1240, after Béla IV ascended the Hungarian throne. Stephen had five brothers, including Gug (II). Stephen's grandfather Gug (I) was the first known member of the branch.

Around 1228, Stephen married an unidentified granddaughter of the influential baron Pat Győr. She had a sister (her name is unknown too), who became the wife of Paul Geregye around the same time. Through the legal doctrine of daughters' quarter, his wife was granted the estate Rahóca in Baranya County from her clan and handed over to Stephen as a dowry. They had a son Emeric, who served as ispán of Somogy County between 1272 and 1273.

== Career ==
Based on his father's court services in the accompaniment of Duke Béla and the political positions of the relatives of his wife (Pat Győr and Paul Geregye), it is highly plausible that Stephen raised in the ducal court from childhood onwards. Duke Béla strongly opposed his father Andrew II's policy since the 1220s. When Béla and his partisans took control of the royal council, Stephen was installed as Master of the cupbearers in 1231, serving in this capacity until 1232. Thereafter, he served as ispán of Bihar County between 1233 and 1235, when the territory belonged to Duke Béla's realm. Shortly before the death of the ailing Andrew II, Duke Béla once again had practically taken control of the country in early 1235. Stephen again functioned as Master of the cupbearers. After Béla IV ascended the Hungarian throne in September 1235, Stephen was replaced by Baldwin Rátót.

Stephen was referred to as Ban of Severin (or Szörény) in January 1243. He was styled as ispán of Csanád County in October 1257. A relative of his wife, Conrad Győr filed a lawsuit against his second cousins, the wives of Paul Geregye and Stephen Csák, disputing the legitimacy of their ownership over Ilsva and Rahóca in Baranya County, respectively. In September 1258, Béla IV rejected Conrad's accusations citing the fact that the two ladies were granted the aforementioned possessions via daughters' quarter during their wedding approximately thirty years ago. Stephen – styled as titular ban – represented the interests of his wife during the lawsuit.

During the emerging conflict between Béla IV and his son and heir Duke Stephen by the early 1260s, Stephen Csák firmly supported the elderly monarch. He also became a confidant of Queen Maria Laskarina. He served as count (head) of the queenly court from 1264 to at least 1269, but it is plausible he held dignity until the death of Queen Maria and Stephen V's ascension to the Hungarian throne in 1270. Beside that, Stephen also functioned as ispán of Vas County between 1264 and 1266, then ispán of Pozsony County from 1267 until 1269 (or 1270). Whether Stephen Csák participated in the 1264–1265 civil war between Béla IV and his son, is unknown. The war resulted Duke Stephen's victory. According to historian Attila Zsoldos, Stephen Csák was one of the barons, who advocated another war against Duke Stephen, but the mobilized royal servants in Esztergom refused to participate in 1267. Stephen acted as an arbiter in the trial between Hahold Hahót and the Gyüre kindred in 1265.

In the spring of 1268, he Serbian king Stefan Uroš I invaded the Duchy of Macsó, the southern province of the Kingdom of Hungary, taking advantage of the internal conflict between Béla IV and Stephen. Duke Béla of Macsó sought assistance from his grandfather. Béla IV sent a royal army commanded by Stephen Csák, who marched into the south in order to liberate the province. The fighting resulted the decisive victory of the Hungarians, King Stefan Uroš I was himself captured by Stephen Csák's army along with the Serbian standards. Because of Stephen's leadership in the military campaign, a charter of Queen Elizabeth the Cuman in 1271 claims that the army was commanded by Queen Maria Laskarina herself. Stephen sent his familiaris Nicholas, son of Mark from Szepes County to inform the royal couple of the victory. His other familiaris Emeric Nádasd also participated in the war. Because of his preeminent role in the Macsó War, Stephen was granted Nezde in Somogy County (currently a wasteland near Szólád). Stephen Csák was last mentioned as a living person in 1269. Béla's death occurred the following year. In case he was alive at the time, he most likely lost all political influence and retired to his estates in Southern Transdanubia after Stephen V ascended the Hungarian throne. Stephen Csák certainly died sometime before 1276.

== Sources ==
- Gál, Judit (2013). "IV. Béla és I. Uroš szerb uralkodó kapcsolata" [The Relationship of Kings Béla IV of Hungary and Uroš I of Serbia]. Századok (in Hungarian). 147 (2): 471–499.
- Karácsonyi, János (1901). A magyar nemzetségek a XIV. század közepéig. I. kötet [The Hungarian genera until the middle of the 14th century, Vol. 1] (in Hungarian). Hungarian Academy of Sciences.
- Zsoldos, Attila (2005). Az Árpádok és asszonyaik. A királynéi intézmény az Árpádok korában [The Árpáds and their Women: The Institution of Queenship in the Era of the Árpáds] (in Hungarian). MTA Történettudományi Intézete. ISBN 963-8312-98-X.
- Zsoldos, Attila (2007). Családi ügy: IV. Béla és István ifjabb király viszálya az 1260-as években [A family affair: The Conflict between Béla IV and Junior King Stephen in the 1260s] (in Hungarian). História, MTA Történettudományi Intézete. ISBN 978-963-9627-15-4.
- Zsoldos, Attila (2011). Magyarország világi archontológiája, 1000–1301 [Secular Archontology of Hungary, 1000–1301] (in Hungarian). História, MTA Történettudományi Intézete. ISBN 978-963-9627-38-3.

Stephen Genus Csák Born: 1200s Died: after 1269
Political offices
Preceded by Lucas Péc	Master of the cupbearers 1231–1232	Succeeded by Baldwin Rátót
Preceded by Alexander Hont-Pázmány	Master of the cupbearers 1235	Succeeded by Baldwin Rátót
Preceded by Osl Osl	Ban of Severin; 1243	Succeeded by Lawrence (?)
Preceded by Benedict	Count of the Queen's Court; 1264–1269/70	Succeeded by Farkas Kacsics
