= Rinyaszentkirály =

Rinyaszentkirály Krâjevo (in Croatian)
- Village
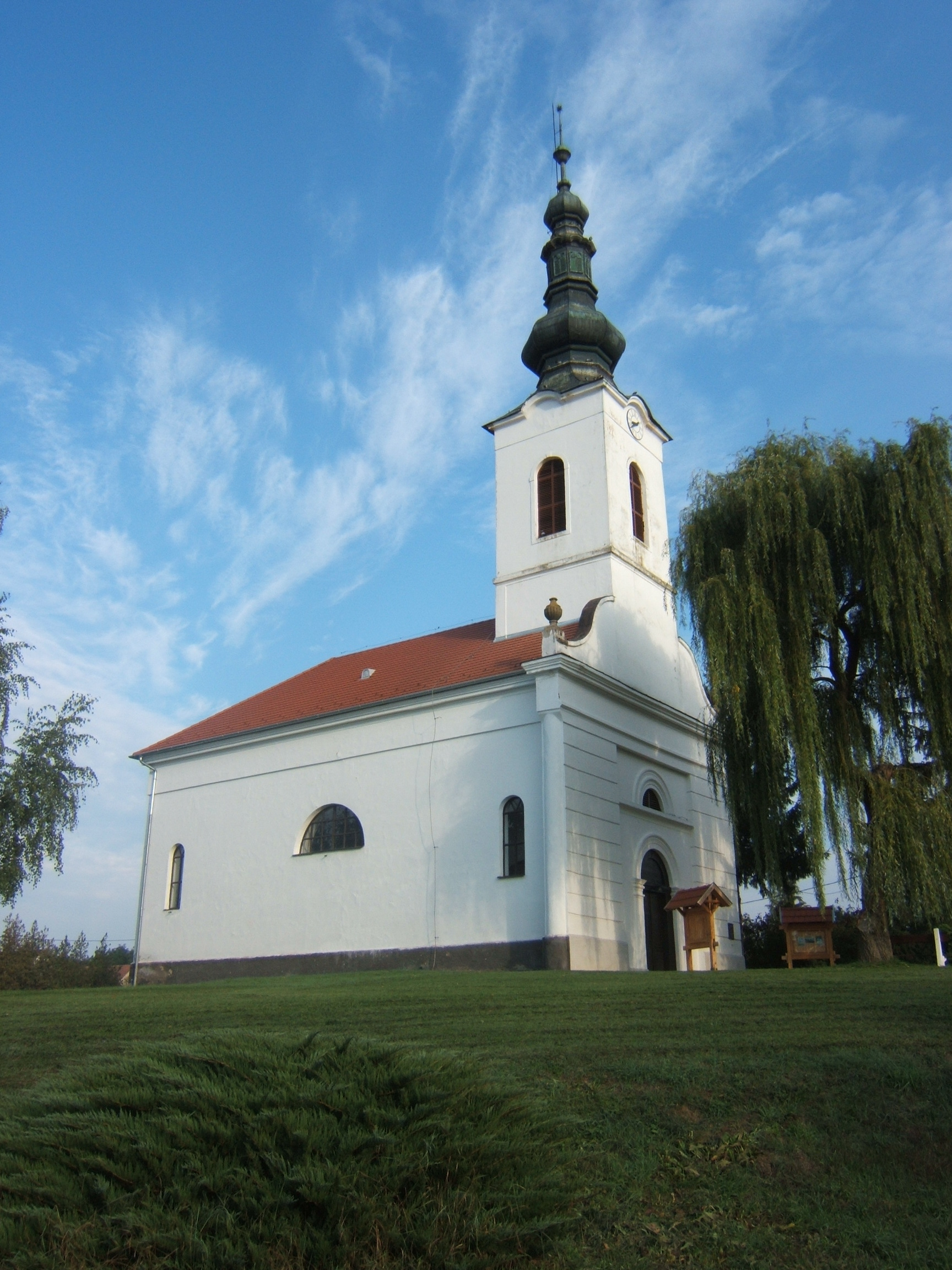
- Reformed Church of Rinyaszentkirály

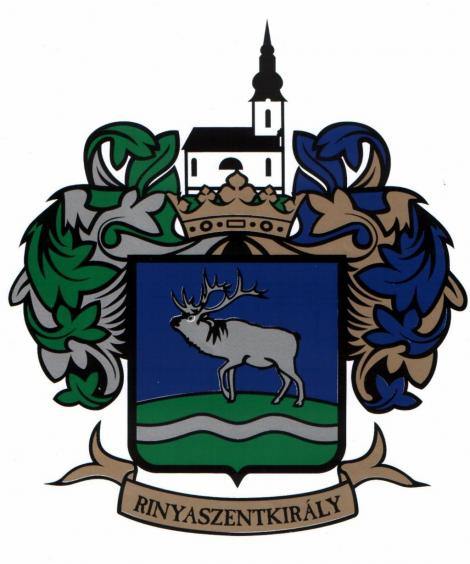
- Coat of arms

- Location of Somogy county in Hungary

- Location of Rinyaszentkirály
- Coordinates: 46.15066°N 17.39209°E
- Country: Hungary
- Region: Southern Transdanubia
- County: Somogy
- District: Nagyatád
- RC Diocese: Kaposvár

Area
  - Total: 30.56 km^{2} (11.80 sq mi)

Population (2017)
  - Total: 391
  - Density: 12.8/km^{2} (33.1/sq mi)
- Demonym(s): szentkirályi, rinyaszentkirályi
- Time zone: UTC+1 (CET)
  - Summer (DST): UTC+2 (CEST)
- Postal code: 7513
- Area code: (+36) 82
- Patron Saint: Stephen I
- NUTS 3 code: HU232
- MP: László Szászfalvi (KDNP)
- Website: Rinyaszentkirály Online

Rinyaszentkirály (Croatian: Krâjevo) is a village in Somogy county, Hungary.

== Etymology ==
According to the local legends, Béla IV of Hungary flew there during the Mongol invasion and later he founded the village. The scientific explanation states that it was named after the patron of its church, Saint Stephen of Hungary, similar to Porrogszentkirály.

== History ==
According to László Szita, the settlement was completely Hungarian in the 18th century.
