= Apaj Gutkeled =

Apaj (I) Gutkeled
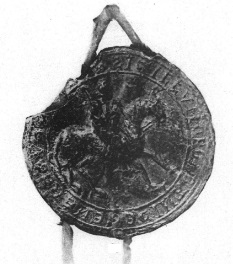
- Seal of Apaj Gutkeled (1239)

Ban of Slavonia
- Reign: 1237–1239
- Predecessor: Julius Kán
- Successor: Nicholas Gutkeled
- Died: after 1239
- Noble family: gens Gutkeled
- Issue: Apaj II

Apaj (I) from the kindred Gutkeled (Hungarian: Gutkeled nembeli (I.) Apaj; died after 1239) was a Hungarian baron in the first third of the 13th century, who served as Ban of Slavonia from 1237 to 1239, during the reign of Béla IV of Hungary.

== Family ==
Apaj was born into the Sárvármonostor branch of the powerful gens (clan) Gutkeled. His parentage is unknown. His brothers were Nicholas (I) and Csépán, ancestors of the Bocskai and Bacskai noble families, respectively. One of his cousins was Dragun, progenitor of the Majád branch. Apaj and his unidentified wife had a son Apaj (II). His branch became extinct in the 1340s.

== Career ==
Apaj was a confidant of prince Coloman, who was Duke of Slavonia from 1226. He functioned as ispán of Somogy County between 1229 and 1234, which then belonged to the duke's province. As a prominent member of Coloman's entourage, he swore to the Oath of Bereg in 1233. Apaj possessed landholdings in Križevci County (Körös) in the area between Legrad and Rasinja (present-day in Croatia). In the latter place he built a castle later called Apajvára (lit. "Apaj's Castle). Apajkeresztúr, the Hungarian name of the village Rasinja still preserves the name of the original owner. The castle is first mentioned by contemporary sources in 1236. According to Croatian historian Baltazar Adam Krčelić, Apaj handed over the fort to the Knights Templar in exchange for his spiritual salvation.

Following Béla's ascension to the Hungarian throne, Apaj was appointed Ban of Slavonia sometime between 1235 and 1237. His deputy was vice-ban Jaksa Isaan, who is mentioned in this capacity throughout from 1238 to 1242. Apaj held his office at least until 1239, when he was succeeded by his brother Nicholas Gutkeled. It is likely that his death can be placed around this time, 1239 or 1240. His surviving seal from 1239 is one of the earliest rare examples in Hungary which depicts a mounted knight. His lands were inherited by his only son Apaj (II), who was also referred to as patron of the Sárvár family monastery in 1270. Apaj's great-grandson, Stephen was the last male member of Apaj's branch.

== Sources ==
- Karácsonyi, János (1901). A magyar nemzetségek a XIV. század közepéig. II. kötet [The Hungarian genera until the middle of the 14th century, Vol. 2] (in Hungarian). Hungarian Academy of Sciences.
- Markó, László (2006). A magyar állam főméltóságai Szent Istvántól napjainkig: Életrajzi Lexikon [Great Officers of State in Hungary from King Saint Stephen to Our Days: A Biographical Encyclopedia] (in Hungarian). Helikon Kiadó. ISBN 963-208-970-7.
- Zsoldos, Attila (2011). Magyarország világi archontológiája, 1000–1301 [Secular Archontology of Hungary, 1000–1301] (in Hungarian). História, MTA Történettudományi Intézete. ISBN 978-963-9627-38-3.
- Zsoldos, Attila (2022). Az Aranybulla királya [The King of the Golden Bull] (in Hungarian). Városi Levéltár és Kutatóintézet. ISBN 978-963-8406-26-2.

Apaj I Genus Gutkeled Born: ? Died: after 1239
Political offices
Preceded by Julius Kán	Ban of Slavonia; 1237–1239	Succeeded by Nicholas Gutkeled
