= Porrog =

Porrog Porog (in Slovene)
- Village
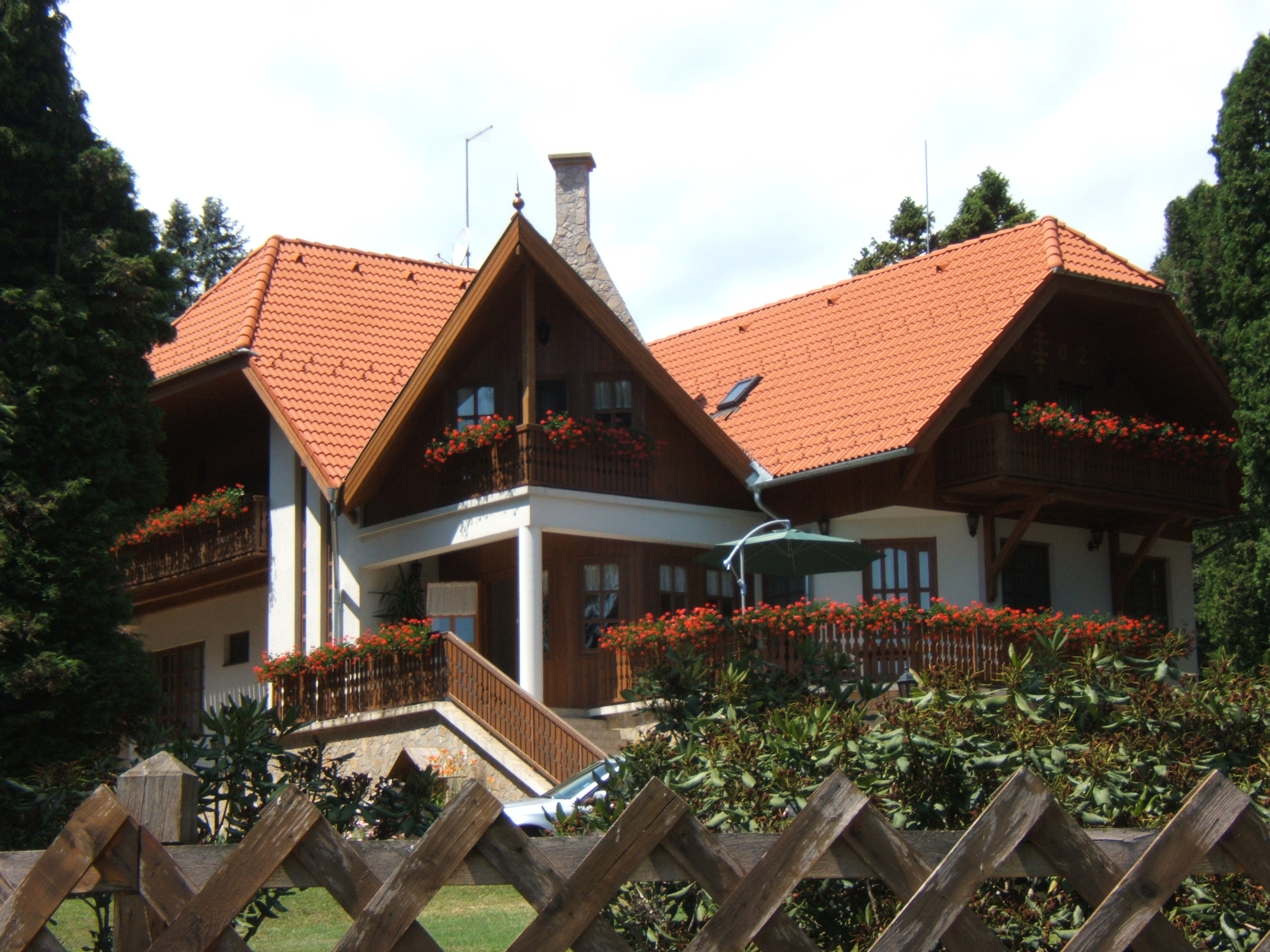
- Hunters' house in Porrog

- Coat of arms

- Location of Somogy county in Hungary

- Location of Porrog
- Coordinates: 46.28941°N 17.03403°E
- Country: Hungary
- Region: Southern Transdanubia
- County: Somogy
- District: Csurgó
- RC Diocese: Kaposvár

Area
  - Total: 14.02 km^{2} (5.41 sq mi)

Population (2017)
  - Total: 211
  - Density: 15.0/km^{2} (39.0/sq mi)
- Demonym: porrogi
- Time zone: UTC+1 (CET)
  - Summer (DST): UTC+2 (CEST)
- Postal code: 8858
- Area code: (+36) 82
- NUTS 3 code: HU232
- MP: László Szászfalvi (KDNP)
- Website: Porrog Online

Porrog (Slovene: Porog) is a village in Somogy county, Hungary, where the Somogy Slovenes lives.
