= Iharos =

- Village
- Coat of arms

- Location of Somogy county in Hungary

- Location of Iharos
- Coordinates: 46.34166°N 17.09489°E
- Country: Hungary
- Region: Southern Transdanubia
- County: Somogy
- District: Csurgó
- RC Diocese: Kaposvár

Area
  - Total: 22.69 km^{2} (8.76 sq mi)

Population (2017)
  - Total: 446
  - Density: 19.7/km^{2} (50.9/sq mi)
- Demonym: iharosi
- Time zone: UTC+1 (CET)
  - Summer (DST): UTC+2 (CEST)
- Postal code: 8726
- Area code: (+36) 82
- NUTS 3 code: HU232
- MP: László Szászfalvi (KDNP)
- Website: Iharos Online

Iharos is a village in Somogy county, Hungary.
