= Őrimagyarósd =

- Village
- Őrimagyarósd
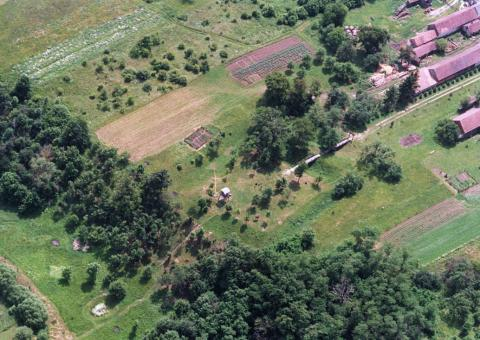

- Location of Őrimagyarósd in Hungary
- Coordinates: 46°53′7.12″N 16°31′58.98″E
- Country: Hungary
- Region: Western Transdanubia
- County: Vas
- Subregion: Őriszentpéteri
- Rank: Village

Area
  - Total: 12.29 km^{2} (4.75 sq mi)

Population
  - Total: 224
  - Density: 18.2/km^{2} (47.2/sq mi)
- Time zone: UTC+1 (CET)
  - Summer (DST): UTC+2 (CEST)
- Postal code: 9933
- Area code: +36 94
- KSH code: 4805

Őrimagyarósd is a village in Vas county, Hungary.
