= Diószegi =

Diószegi is a surname of Hungarian origin. Notable people with the surname include:

- Nikolett Diószegi (born 1996), Hungarian handballer
- Balázs Diószegi (1914–1999), Hungarian painter
