= Szőce =

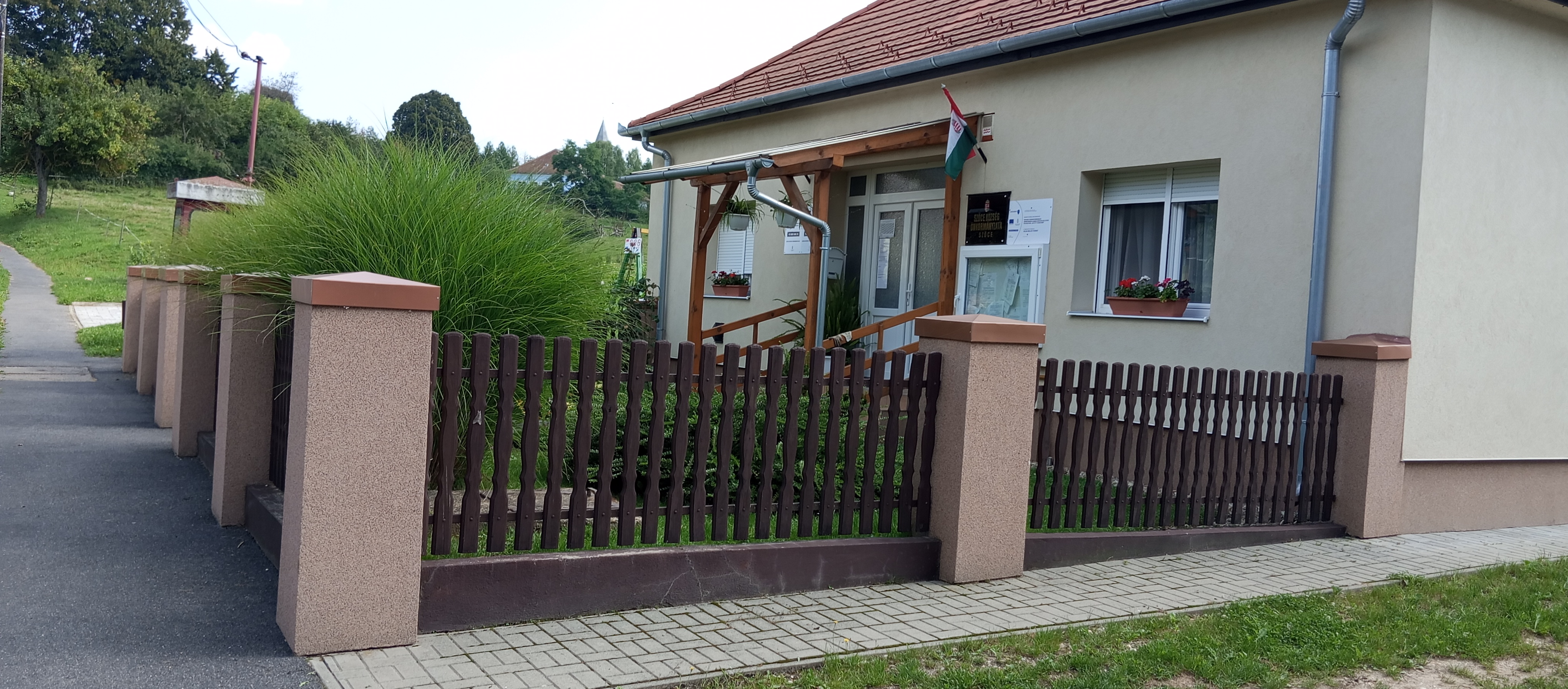
- Town hall

- Coat of arms

- Location of Szőce in Hungary
- Coordinates: 46°53′13.09″N 16°34′7.54″E
- Country: Hungary
- Region: Western Transdanubia
- County: Vas
- Subregion: Őriszentpéteri
- Rank: Village

Area
  - Total: 18.71 km^{2} (7.22 sq mi)
- Time zone: UTC+1 (CET)
  - Summer (DST): UTC+2 (CEST)
- Postal code: 9935
- Area code: +36 94
- Website: www.szoce.hu

Szőce is a village in Vas county, Hungary.
