= Gógánfa =

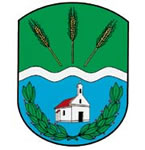
- Coat of arms

- Location of Veszprém county in Hungary

- Location of Gógánfa
- Coordinates: 47.02168°N 17.18999°E
- Country: Hungary
- County: Veszprém

Area
  - Total: 13.17 km^{2} (5.08 sq mi)

Population (2004)
  - Total: 783
  - Density: 59.45/km^{2} (154.0/sq mi)
- Time zone: UTC+1 (CET)
  - Summer (DST): UTC+2 (CEST)
- Postal code: 8346
- Area code: 87

Gógánfa is a village in Veszprém county, Hungary.
