= Gúttamási =

- Location of Fejér county in Hungary

- Location of Gúttamási
- Coordinates: 47.27782°N 18.19709°E
- Country: Hungary
- County: Fejér

Population (2022)
  - Total: 89
- Time zone: UTC+1 (CET)
  - Summer (DST): UTC+2 (CEST)
- Postal code: 8045
- Area code: 22

Gúttamási is a village in Fejér County, Hungary. It was previously a municipality. The municipality of Gúttamási was divided in 1966: the village itself was merged with Isztimér while Kincsesbánya was created from other parts.
