= Zákány =

Zákány Zakon / Žakanj (in Croatian)
- Village
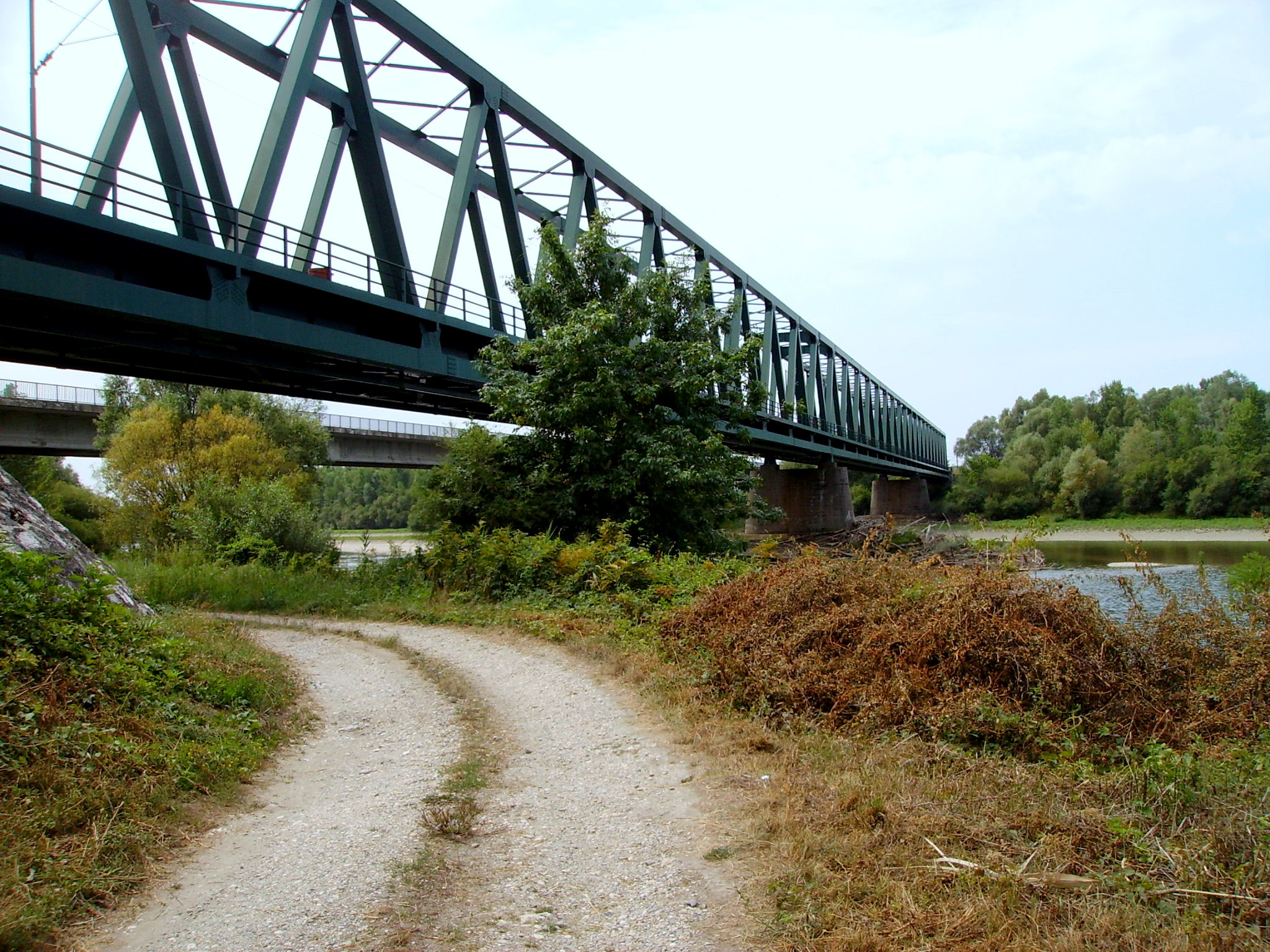
- Croatian rail border in Zákány above Dráva

- Coat of arms

- Location of Somogy county in Hungary

- Location of Zákány
- Coordinates: 46°15′06″N 16°56′57″E
- Country: Hungary
- Region: Southern Transdanubia
- County: Somogy
- District: Csurgó
- RC Diocese: Kaposvár

Area
  - Total: 9.09 km^{2} (3.51 sq mi)

Population (2018)
  - Total: 1,009
  - Density: 111/km^{2} (287/sq mi)
- Demonym: zákányi
- Time zone: UTC+1 (CET)
  - Summer (DST): UTC+2 (CEST)
- Postal code: 8852
- Area code: (+36) 82
- NUTS 3 code: HU232
- MP: László Szászfalvi (KDNP)
- Website: Zákány's Official website

Zákány (Croatian: Zakon / Žakanj) is a village in Hungary which is located in Somogy County next to the Croatian border.

== Location of Zákány ==
Located in Southern Transdanubia, next to the Croatian border and river Dráva.

Nearest Cities:

- Csurgó:16 km
- Nagykanizsa:20 km

== History of Zákány ==
The first mention of Zákány was in 1227 in the middle of the Mongol invasion of Europe when Zákány was called Zacun. In 1309 the people changed the village's name to Zakaan. The first refer to the village's castle was in 1325. In the 14th century (1332) the village had a parish.
