= Inke =

- Village
- Coat of arms

- Location of Somogy county in Hungary

- Location of Inke, Hungary
- Coordinates: 46.39250°N 17.19159°E
- Country: Hungary
- Region: Southern Transdanubia
- County: Somogy
- District: Csurgó
- RC Diocese: Kaposvár

Area
  - Total: 51.76 km^{2} (19.98 sq mi)

Population (2017)
  - Total: 1,149
  - Density: 22.20/km^{2} (57.49/sq mi)
- Demonym: inkei
- Time zone: UTC+1 (CET)
  - Summer (DST): UTC+2 (CEST)
- Postal code: 8724
- Area code: (+36) 82
- NUTS 3 code: HU232
- MP: László Szászfalvi (KDNP)
- Website: Inke Online

Inke is a village in Somogy county, Hungary. It has roughly 1000 inhabitants.
