= Marcaltő =

- Location of Veszprém county in Hungary

- Location of Marcaltő
- Coordinates: 47.43195°N 17.36538°E
- Country: Hungary
- County: Veszprém

Area
  - Total: 22.09 km^{2} (8.53 sq mi)

Population (2004)
  - Total: 871
  - Density: 39.42/km^{2} (102.1/sq mi)
- Time zone: UTC+1 (CET)
  - Summer (DST): UTC+2 (CEST)
- Postal code: 8532
- Area code: 89

Marcaltő is a village in Veszprém county, Hungary.
