= Malomsok =

- Location of Veszprém county in Hungary

- Location of Malomsok
- Coordinates: 47.45039°N 17.39287°E
- Country: Hungary
- County: Veszprém

Area
  - Total: 25.74 km^{2} (9.94 sq mi)

Population (2004)
  - Total: 601
  - Density: 23.34/km^{2} (60.5/sq mi)
- Time zone: UTC+1 (CET)
  - Summer (DST): UTC+2 (CEST)
- Postal code: 8533
- Area code: 89

Malomsok is a village in Veszprém county, Hungary.
