= Iharosberény =

Iharosberény Beryn (in Latin) Berinja (in Croatian)
- Village
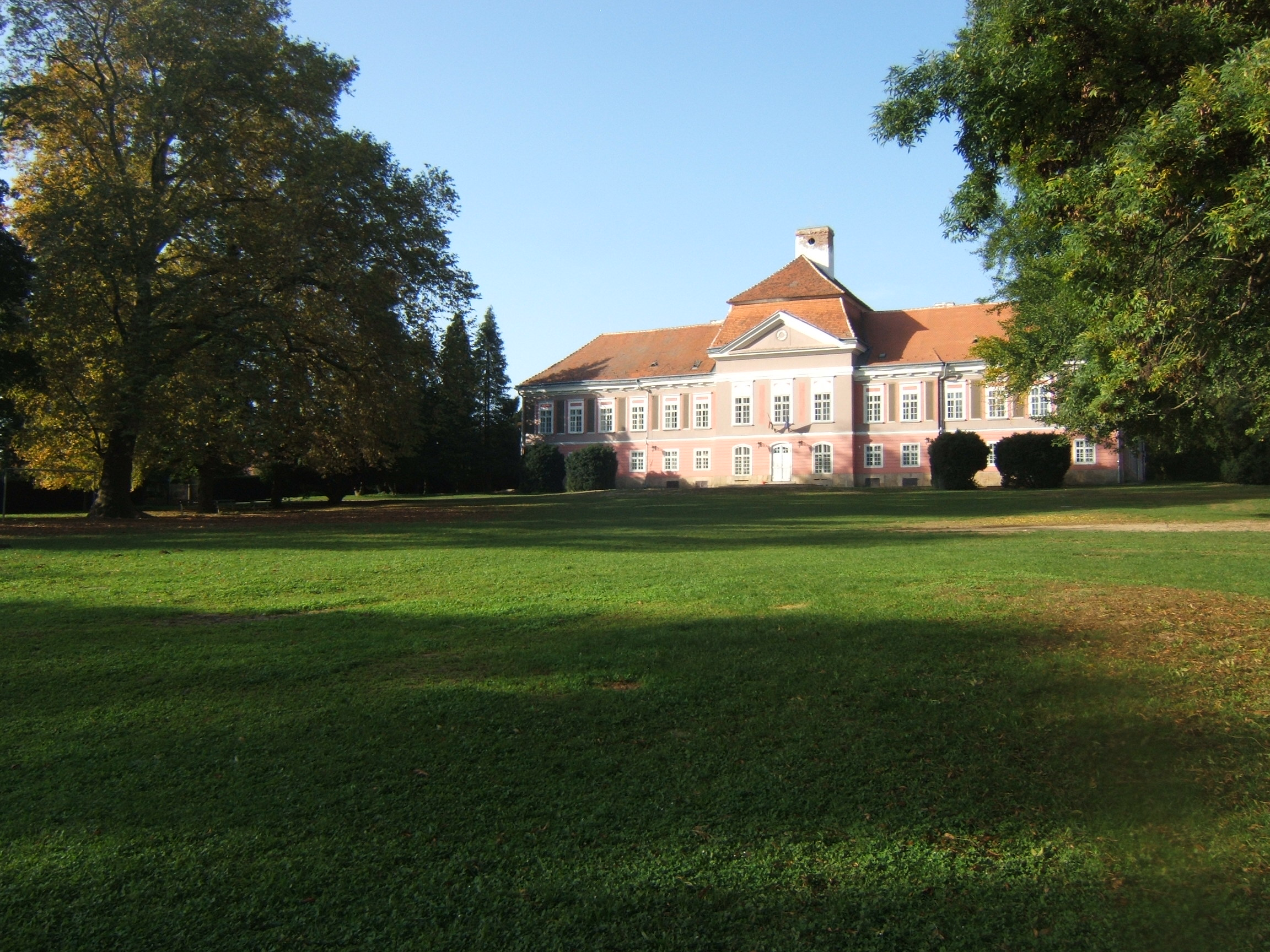
- Inkey Mansion in Iharosberény

- Coat of arms

- Location of Somogy county in Hungary

- Location of Iharosberény
- Coordinates: 46.36627°N 17.11123°E
- Country: Hungary
- Region: Southern Transdanubia
- County: Somogy
- District: Csurgó
- RC Diocese: Kaposvár

Area
  - Total: 49.65 km^{2} (19.17 sq mi)

Population (2017)
  - Total: 1,257
  - Density: 25.32/km^{2} (65.57/sq mi)
- Demonym: iharosberényi
- Time zone: UTC+1 (CET)
  - Summer (DST): UTC+2 (CEST)
- Postal code: 8725
- Area code: (+36) 82
- NUTS 3 code: HU232
- MP: László Szászfalvi (KDNP)
- Website: Iharosberény Online

Iharosberény (Latin: Beryn, Croatian: Berinja) is a village in Somogy county, Hungary.
