= Isztimér =

Isztimér Ißzimmer
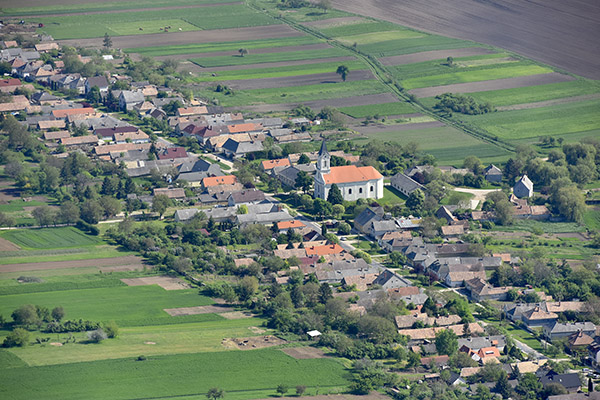
- Aerial view of the village

- Coat of arms

- Location of Fejér county in Hungary

- Location of Isztimér
- Coordinates: 47.27958°N 18.19466°E
- Country: Hungary
- County: Fejér

Area
  - Total: 53.91 km^{2} (20.81 sq mi)

Population (2004)
  - Total: 977
  - Density: 18.12/km^{2} (46.9/sq mi)
- Time zone: UTC+1 (CET)
  - Summer (DST): UTC+2 (CEST)
- Postal code: 8045
- Area code: 22
- Website: www.isztimer.hu

Isztimér (German: Ißzimmer) is a village in Fejér County, Hungary. It incorporates most of the former municipality of Gúttamási.
