= Favus of Pannonhalma =

Hungarian clergyman from 1252 to 1265

Favus
- Abbot of Pannonhalma
- Installed: 1252
- Term ended: 1265
- Predecessor: Solomon
- Successor: Boniface
- Previous post: Abbot of Pécsvárad

Personal details
- Died: 1265
- Denomination: Catholic

Favus (died 1265) was a Hungarian clergyman in the 13th century, who served as Abbot of Pannonhalma from 1252 until his death.

== Abbot of Pécsvárad ==
His origins, early life and career, his studies are unknown. Prior to the papal confirmation of his election as superior of the Pannonhalma Abbey in 1252, Favus served as the abbot of Pécsvárad Abbey for an unknown period of time. It is possible he already held the position during the first Mongol invasion of Hungary, which occurred in 1241–1242. The monastery of Pécsvárad was attacked and looted by the Mongols too around February or March 1242.

Following the withdrawal of the Mongols, Favus ordered to reconstruct and fortify the building complex of the Pécsvárad Abbey. King Béla IV of Hungary also permitted him to build Zengő Castle at the top of the namesake mountain; the ruin is located northwest of Pécsvárad, approximately 3.5 km as the crow flies. Based on on-site archaeological excavations, the construction of the castle was left unfinished, perhaps due to Favus' transfer to Pannonhalma.

== Abbot of Pannonhalma ==
Favus was elected abbot of Pannonhalma in 1252, succeeding Solomon. Despite having previously invalidated his appointment, Pope Innocent IV confirmed his election on 19 December 1252. Favus inherited a monastic community laden with internal conflicts from his predecessors. There was a quarrel between the laity and the members of the monastic order within the abbey, they did not follow the rules of monastic life and refused obedience, as Favus' complaints were narrated by the letter of Pope Alexander IV on 10 October 1256. Favus was forced to apply ecclesiastical penalty against renitents, he even excommunicated some of them. Favus also reported the general situation of the loosened discipline within the monasteries in Hungary. Pope Alexander entrusted Favus and three other abbots to visit all monasteries in the kingdom in order to restore discipline and monastic rule and to summon a general assembly of the Benedictines in Hungary. Under his tenure, the Greek monastery of St. Andrew near Veszprém was handed over to the Benedictine Order. Favus participated in the consecration of the monastery at Ják in 1256, celebrated by Amadeus Pok, the Bishop of Győr.

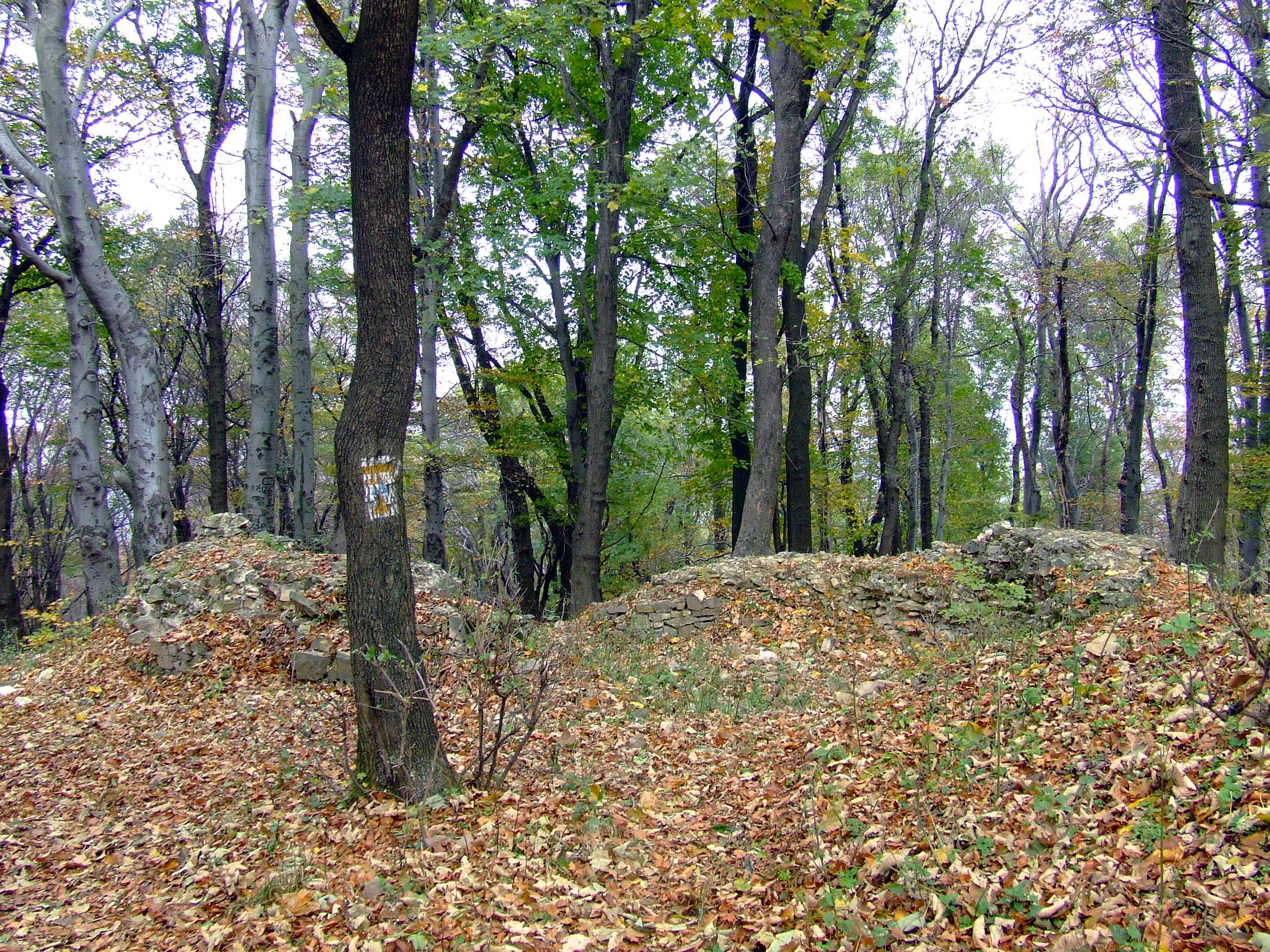
The few surviving ruins of Zengő Castle at the top of Zengő, built by Favus, when he served as Abbot of Pécsvárad

During his abbacy, Favus enriched the abbey's wealth with numerous estates and possessions. The monastery were granted several land donations from the neighboring lords and ladies, and the Hungarian royal family, for instance Pázmánd (1253), Dörög (1258), Szigliget (1260, from Béla IV and his son Duke Stephen), St. Emeric chapel at Porva (1260, from Duke Stephen), Tamási, Péterd (1262) and a portion Csicsal (1262). In addition, Favus also bought several landholdings, for instance a portion in Rád (1255, near present-day Balatonlelle), another portions in Csicsal (1260 and 1261), Bocsmala (1261), Starduna (1262) and Kusdeuch (1263). Favus also acquired Dénesd (present-day a borough of Dunajská Lužná in Slovakia) as compensation for a pecuniary debt in 1258. When King Béla IV retook Szigliget from the abbey in 1262, he compensated the abbot with three landholdings (Bak, Derbete and Alma). Favus acquired the estate Tard from the gens (clan) Rád, who were completely indebted to the abbey. In 1263, the Pannonhalma Abbey was compensated after a debate of about eighty years for the confiscation of Küszén Abbey in late 12th century (present-day Güssing Castle), when Béla IV donated some landholdings – for instance, Patvaróc (Potvorice, Slovakia) – in Nyitra County to Pannonhalma. Favus exchanged the village Hagymás for Jurény (Győr County) with the Pongrác family in 1262. Favus was also involved in various lawsuits over the boundaries of their possessions with neighboring lords, free people and Zselicszentjakab Abbey, for instance in the settlements Fény, Hegymagas, Tényő and Nyulas (today Jois, Austria), Patvaróc, Derbéte and Lubó. Favus also had conflicts over the right to collect the tithe in Somogy County with the Knights Hospitaller of Csurgó, the collegiate chapter of Székesfehérvár and the Diocese of Veszprém.

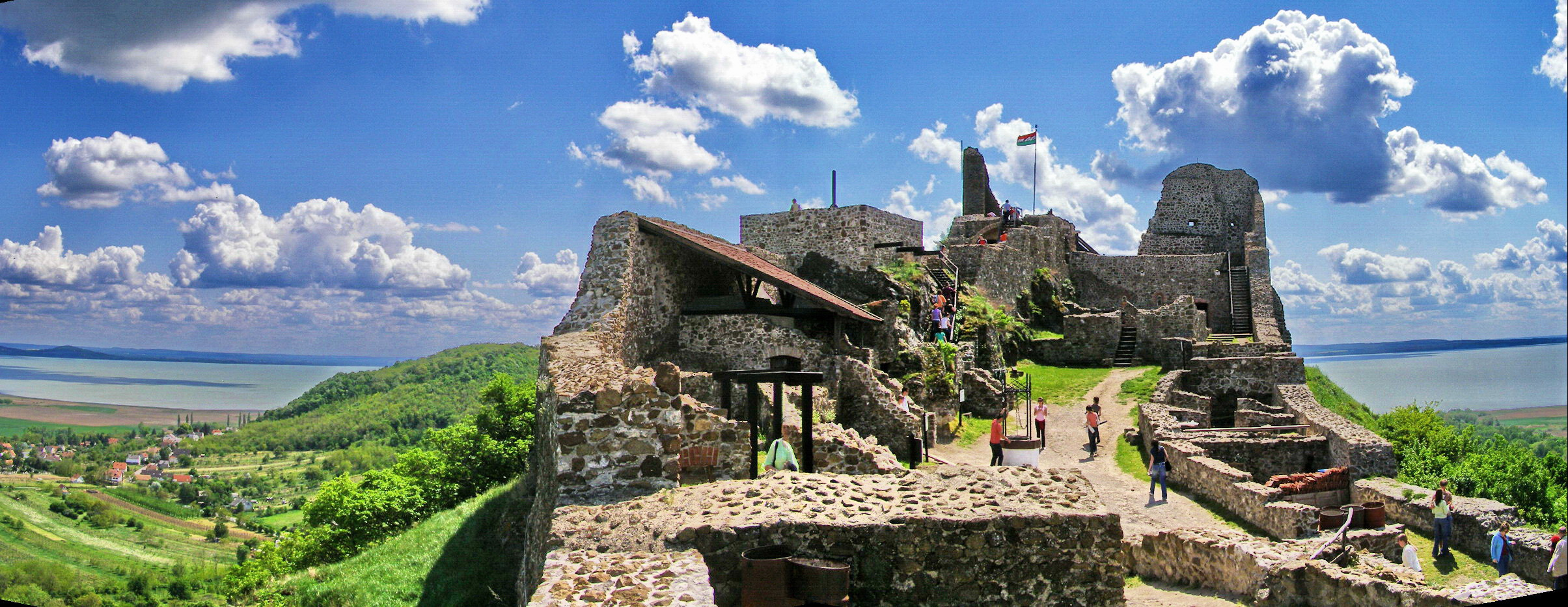
The castle of Szigliget, built by Abbot Favus between 1260 and 1262

Following the Mongol invasion, King Béla IV abandoned the ancient royal prerogative to build and own castles, promoting the erection of nearly 100 new fortresses by the end of his reign. The monarch and his son Duke Stephen jointly donated "an island of Lake Balaton" – Szigliget – with its accessories (villages, forests, vineyards, meadows, hayfields and fishponds) to the Pannonhalma Abbey in 1260 – prior to that, the landholding was the property of Atyusz III Atyusz then King Béla's cousin and royal prince John Angelos (or Kaloyan), who were ispáns of Zala County. Favus built a castle in the newly acquired field in just two years. Béla considered the fort as "strong and useful", as a result he took back Szigliget and its castle and handed over to his faithful confidant Maurice Pok in 1262, who possessed several landholdings in the region. According to historian Károly Kozák, Favus decided to build Szigliget Castle in order to be able to fight successfully in the event of an attack, as in Pannonhalma, and to provide shelter for the surrounding population. In addition, it was important for the connection between the large estates of the Benedictine abbeys of Pannonhalma, Tihany, Zalavár, Somogyvár and Almád, which are scattered in Transdanubia. In contrast, Annamária Bartha considers Béla IV initiated the process, who, in order to increase the military resistance of the kingdom, delegated to his subjects the task of building the castle, giving it possession for their construction and maintenance. Béla chose the Pannonhalma Abbey in the region because of their financial resources, which exceeded the wealth of the surrounding genera (e.g. Atyusz and Pok). It is possible that Béla IV handed over the castle to Maurice Pok because a civil war broke out between him and his son Duke Stephen, and he wanted to entrust the fortifications of his kingdom to militarily skilled nobles.

Favus requested the Hungarian king to confirm and transcribe the privileges and rights of the Pannonhalma Abbey in 1257. During Favus' abbacy, the Benedictine abbey was directly subordinate to the Holy See ("nullo medio"). Favus participated in the national synods in 1256 and 1263 (Buda), consequently he was considered among the members of the Hungarian prelates (archbishops, bishops). In October 1256, Pope Alexander IV permitted the right to the abbey to offer indulgences annually on the feast day of St. Martin (11 November). The issuance of diplomas and documents has begun in the Pannonhalma Abbey during Favus' governance; the abbey became an important place of authentication. Abbot Favus also fulfilled various papal assignments. For instance, he had to ensure the payment of annual 300 silver marks from the Archdiocese of Esztergom's income to the elected cardinal Stephen Báncsa since 1253–1254, who unsuccessfully tried to return to Hungary due to financial difficulties. Favus investigated the exercise of jurisdiction of the Archdiocese of Kalocsa over the Diocese of Bosnia in 1264. King Béla IV also entrusted him with several tasks during litigation and determination of boundaries in Transdanubia.

== Sources ==
- Bartha, Annamária (2011). "Egy 13. századi életút: Favus apát karriertörténete [A Career from the 13th Century: Life of Abbot Favus]". Magyar Egyháztörténeti Vázlatok (in Hungarian). 23 (1–2): 5–31. ISSN 0865-5227.
- Bartha, Annamária (2014). "Favus apát várépítései? Adalékok Szigliget és Zengővár építéstörténetéhez [Castle Building Projects of Abbot Favus? Contributions to the Building History of Szigliget and Zengővár]". In Rácz, Tibor Ákos (ed.). A múltnak kútja. Fiatal középkoros régészek V. konferenciájának tanulmánykötete // The Fountain of the Past. Study Volume of the Fifth Annual Conference of Young Medieval Archaeologists (in Hungarian). Ferenczy Múzeum. pp. 257–267. ISBN 978-963-9590-79-3.

Catholic Church titles
Preceded by Solomon	Abbot of Pannonhalma; 1252–1265	Succeeded by Boniface
