= Nicholas Pok =

Hungarian lord

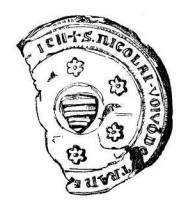
- Seal of Nicholas Pok (1277)

Voivode of Transylvania
- Reign: 1277(–1278); 1315–1316
- Predecessor: Matthew Csák (1st term); Ladislaus Kán (2nd term)
- Successor: Finta Aba (1st term); Dózsa Debreceni (2nd term)
- Born: c. 1245
- Died: after 19 August 1319
- Noble family: gens Pok
- Spouses: Elizabeth Dárói; Catherine Kaplon
- Issue: Maurice IV; Stephen II; Nicholas II
- Father: Maurice II Pok
- Mother: N. Rátót

Nicholas from the kindred Pok (Hungarian: Pok nembeli Miklós; c. 1245 – after 19 August 1319; fl. 1270–1319) was a Hungarian influential lord at the turn of the 13th and 14th centuries. He held positions in the royal court in the 1270s. He acquired extensive landholdings and estates in the area between the rivers Tisza and Szamos (Someș). He was among the so-called oligarchs, who ruled de facto independently their dominion during the era of feudal anarchy. He was also ancestor of the Meggyesi noble family, thus later charters also referred to him as Nicholas Meggyesi.

== Family ==
He was born into the wealthy Pok kindred, which originated from Győr County. He belonged to the Mórichida branch, which erected a Premonstratensian monastery in 1251 at Mórichida. The branch was founded by Maurice I, Nicholas' grandfather, who served King Andrew II as his Master of the stewards from 1233 to 1235. His only known son was Maurice II, Nicholas' father, who held several positions (most notably Master of the treasury) in the court of King Béla IV at least until 1269. He married a daughter of Dominic I Rátót (she died before 1267) whom Nicholas was born around 1245. He had three younger brothers, Maurice III, Stephen I and Dominic, who were mentioned only once in 1280 when they were excommunicated due to "tyrannical behaviour". After Maurice's death, the brothers jointly owned Pok, Tét, Baráti and Mórichida in Győr County, along with other sporadic lands throughout the kingdom.

Nicholas appeared first in contemporary records in 1270. According to the sources he married twice; his first wife was Elizabeth, a daughter of Mojs (II) Dárói, Palatine of Hungary between 1270 and 1272. She died before 1280. They had at least three sons: Maurice IV, the ispán of Győr County from 1337 to 1338, Stephen II, the ispán of Máramaros County between 1326 and 1327, and magister Nicholas II. Maurice's son was Simon Meggyesi, Ban of Croatia, thus Nicholas was also an ancestor of the influential Meggyesi family. After Elizabeth's death, he married for the second time to Catherine, daughter of Andrew from the Kaplon kindred. She survived her husband and died sometime after 1331.

It is a widely accepted academic standpoint that the wife of Palatine Mojs II (Nicholas' mother-in-law) had family relationship with the Árpád dynasty, the royal house of Hungary through Queen Elizabeth the Cuman thus Nicholas Pok was also part of the Árpáds' distant kinship. Furthermore, Palatine Mojs' other daughter was engaged to Henry II Kőszegi. Through his granddaughter Anne, Nicholas Pok was also maternal ancestor of the royal house of Báthory de Somlyó, which ruled in Transylvania and Poland in the 16th century.

== Life ==
=== Political career under the Árpáds ===
When Stephen V ascended the throne in 1270 after a lengthy wait, Nicholas' career arose. At the preceding decades there were intense throne fights between Béla IV and his son Duke Stephen who was later granted the title of Junior king. Although Maurice II Pok had formerly received the Fülek Castle (today: Fiľakovo, Slovakia) from Béla IV in 1246 for his bravery in the Battle of Mohi during the Mongol invasion, however he later handed over the castle to Duke Stephen in 1262, who had openly rebelled against his father. This resulted that Pok genus was unable to get positions during the late reign of Béla IV. Maurice II became ispán of Baranya County only in 1266, when father and son confirmed the peace in the Convent of the Blessed Virgin on 'Rabbits' Island.

Nicholas was donated five villages – Sárköz (Livada), Avas and Újváros (Orașu Nou), Vámfalu (Vama) and Parlag (Prilog) – by Stephen V in 1270 for possible former military achievements during the 1260s civil war. Through marriage he became resident of Szatmár County by then, after that his life and career tied to Transylvania. However his lord suddenly fell ill and died in August 1272, following Ban Joachim Gutkeled kidnapped Stephen's ten-year-old son and heir, Ladislaus and imprisoned him in the castle of Koprivnica. During that time two rival baronial groups emerged (supporters of the minor Ladislaus and former partisans of the late Béla IV, who returned to Hungary after Stephen's death), while the royal power was fatally weakened.

The rivalry between the two parties characterized the following years. According to historian Bálint Hóman, twelve "changes of government" took place in the first five regnal years of Ladislaus IV. Nicholas Pok was appointed Master of the cupbearers in 1273 (19th-century historian Mór Wertner mistakenly identified him as Nicholas Kőszegi), however soon he had to give the position to Lawrence, son of Voivode Lawrence, who belonged to the Kőszegi–Gutkeled baronial group. Following that, when Ottokar II of Bohemia invaded Hungary and seized many fortresses, Nicholas participated in the Siege of Nagyszombat (today Trnava, Slovakia). In 1274, he was reinstalled as Master of the cupbearers, beside that he also served as ispán of Bereg, Keve, Krassó and possibly Ugocsa Counties. For the participation in the campaign, Ladislaus IV donated him Hegymagas in Zala County. Following the Battle of Föveny, where Henry I Kőszegi, leader of the Kőszegi–Gutkeled baronial group was killed, members of the Csák baronial group elevated. From 1274 to 1275, Nicholas functioned as Master of the stewards and ispán of Moson County. According to a non-authentic charter, he also held the dignity in 1278. In 1275, Joachim Gutkeled and the Kőszegi sons (Ivan, Henry II, Nicholas I and Peter) carried out a successful counter-attack, and Nicholas, among others, lost his positions.

Nicholas and his brothers participated in Peter I Csák's raiding expedition against the Diocese of Veszprém (where Peter Kőszegi served as bishop) in March 1276, where their forces destroyed, burned and looted Veszprém, the cathedral treasury and its chapel university which was never rebuilt. Several news reports and diplomas say that Nicholas Pok continued to plunder the Transdanubian churches in the following years, while he also invaded Tapolca in Zala County around 1278. They attacked and ravaged the church property in Tapolca, Csököly and Görgeteg, while also devastated the episcopal village Hegymagas, slaughtering the local population. Bishop Peter Kőszegi excommunicated the Pok brothers in 1280, but there were no any consequences for that. In retaliation, besides the punishment of excommunication, Peter Kőszegi's troops raided the family monastery of the Pok clan in the namesake village near Győr. He ordered to transfer its treasury, relics and jewelry to St. Michael's Cathedral of Veszprém. In 1285, he personally led his episcopal army in the siege of the castle of Szigliget, also owned by Nicholas and his brothers. There, he confiscated the seized religious relics and values, including chasubles, books and gems for his diocese. Some historians connect and merge the two events, and consider the treasury of the Pok monastery were transferred to Szigliget Castle sometime after the Mongol invasion.

In 1277, for a short time, Nicholas Pok held the positions of Voivode of Transylvania and ispán of Szolnok County. In accordance with a false diploma, he held these positions already in 1276. His voivode seal also preserved. According to Tamás Kádár, Nicholas served as voivode until 1278, when he was replaced by Finta Aba. In the next two decades, Nicholas did not hold any political offices. This was the period when the independent domains were strengthened and gradually distanced themselves from the royal power.

=== Establishment of the Pok domain ===
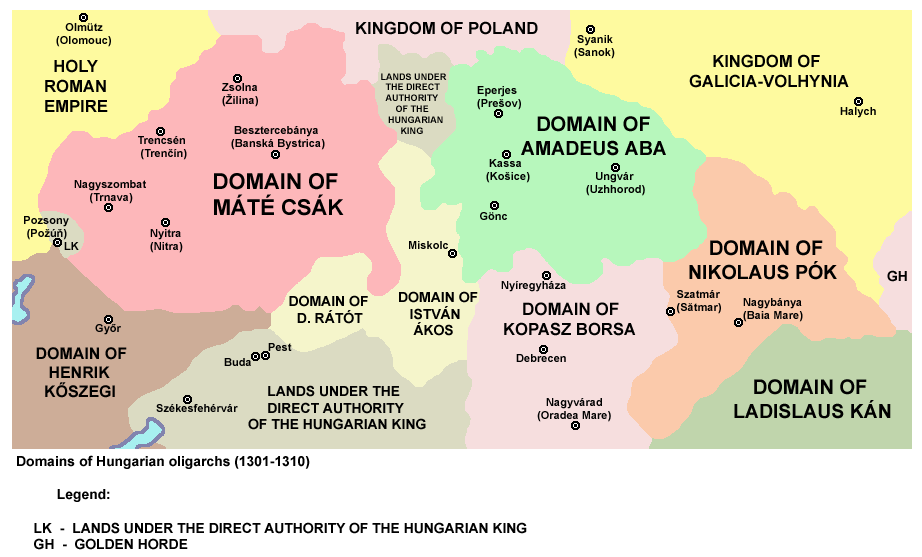
The Pok dominion (orange) among the other oligarchs

Under these chaotic conditions, Nicholas Pok, among others, also could establish a dominion independently of the king. Nicholas had started to expand his influence over the territories that surrounded his possessions and castles (e.g., Szamosújvár). Presumably he also built the Somlyó Castle. Acquiring landholdings across the river Szamos (Someș), Nicholas became the incontestable lord in Northwest Transylvania for decades (in the basin between the rivers Tisza and Szamos), which later mostly was part of the so-called Partium from the 16th century. His territory roughly covered Szatmár, Ugocsa and Máramaros counties. Albeit Nicholas was one of the "oligarchs" in the Kingdom of Hungary plagued by anarchy, civil wars and fragmentation, he has not so much notorious like Matthew Csák, Amadeus Aba or Ladislaus Kán. Otherwise, the Pok clan also had land possessions in Győr, Nógrád, Gömör, Kraszna and Kolozs Counties. Nicholas and his brothers possessed contiguous lands, the Somlyó lordship (present-day Șimleu Silvaniei, Romania) in the region of Szilágyság (Sălaj). Until 1285, they also owned Szigliget Castle in Zala County which was the kindred's only stone castle before 1290. Probably Nicholas seized the fortification arbitrarily without the permission of the king.

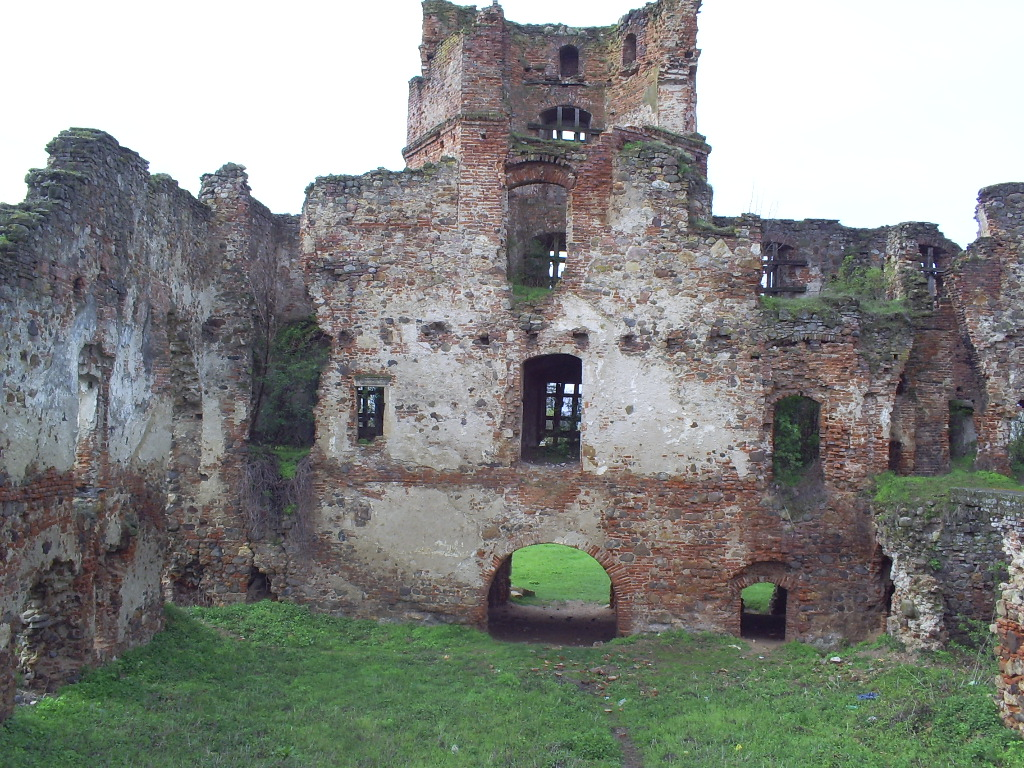
The fortress of Medieșu Aurit (Aranyosmeggyes), Nicholas Pok's seat

On 26 September 1280, Mojs II wrote his last will and testament, bequeathed his Transylvanian properties of Zolun and Meggyes (today Medieșu Aurit, Romania) to his daughter, the wife of Nicholas. Following this the entire family moved from Transdanubia to Meggyes which became Nicholas' court and the dominion's capital. Nicholas also erected a castle there. In the upcoming decades, his family adopted their surname Meggyesi after the caste, which functioned as the provincial seat of Nicholas's dominion. Meanwhile, Nicholas was widowed and later married Catherine Kaplon, a member of the local nobility, who was much younger than him as she was still alive in 1331.

His name was mentioned next time on 7 August 1299, during the reign of Andrew III, when he was ordered as ispán of Ugocsa County by the king. He held that office until 1303, beside that he was also ispán of Máramaros County for at least twenty years, between 1299 and 1319.

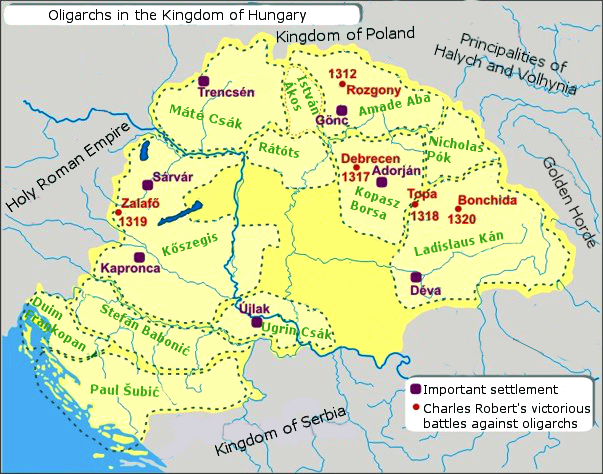
Oligarchs in Hungary during the Interregnum

When Andrew III died suddenly in January 1301, a war of succession broke out between Charles Anjou and Wenceslaus Přemysl, whom supported by his father, Wenceslaus II of Bohemia. During that time the pretenders tried to convince the oligarchs to support them. Nicholas' position is unknown in the initial period, he did not take any realm dignity. He devoted himself to Charles only in October 1307, when the Anjou supporters had already occupied Buda in June 1307. Nicholas Pok took part in the Diet of Rákos, where the nobles officially recognized Charles as their king.

According to historians Gyula Kristó and János Karácsonyi, Nicholas fought in the Battle of Rozgony on 15 June 1312, where the Aba dominion was annihilated. On 8 July 1312, he was a member of the king's inner council which convened in Sárospatak, a former centrum of the Abas' province. According to a royal charter, Nicholas moved to Buda by 1 August 1313, where, alongside Palatine James Borsa and Treasurer Dominic II Rátót (Nicholas' maternal cousin), judged in the name of king over Judge royal John Csák, who betrayed Charles and became a partisan of his distant relative Matthew III Csák.

=== Role in Charles' unification war ===
Transylvania was administered de facto independently by Ladislaus III Kán since 1295. As a neighbor of his province, his rapid expansionist policy meant a constant threat to Nicholas Pok's province in the north-western part of Transylvania. Ladislaus Kán died either in 1314 or 1315. Following his death, Nicholas Pok was appointed Voivode of Transylvania in July 1315 by Charles, a position which was once already held by himself almost forty years ago. He also became the ispán of Szolnok County. However the Kán kindred had several supporters in the region and the late oligarch's son Ladislaus IV Kán also declared himself voivode thus Nicholas Pok was unable to take up his office. According to Tamás Kádár, Nicholas Pok was appointed to the dignity because of his local interests and social embeddedness, in addition to his sporadic landholdings beyond the King's Pass (also known as Gate of Transylvania, which was considered the border between Hungary proper and Transylvania). Given his extensive estates, Nicholas may have been large number of loyal and reliable familiares, so he could quickly mobilize a serious force in a military campaign against the Kán dominion. In the surrounding lands, Nicholas Pok was the most influential pro-Charles lord, who meant a counter-balance against the Káns' suppression for the local lesser nobles.

Upon the order of Charles I, Nicholas crossed the north border of the province at Zilah (today Zalău, Romania), because Mojs II Ákos, an ally of the Borsa clan, had rebelled against the monarch. The Kán sons also joined the insurgent movement. Nicholas reached Kolozsvár (today Cluj-Napoca, Romania) in the middle of November 1315, however the following campaigns have failed against Mojs Ákos in Kolozs County.

Because of uncertain chronology, there are several contradictory interpretations among the historians to outline the course of events. Historian Pál Engel, who first attempted to reconstruct the order of events in his 1988 study, argued the peace between Charles and the Borsas has collapsed by the first half of 1316. Accordingly, James Borsa made an alliance against Charles with Ladislaus Kán's sons and other lords, including Mojs. Engel, who connected their conspiracy with Stefan Milutin's campaign against Hungary, argued, they broke the rebellion around the end of 1316. As a part of this, Mojs was victorious over Nicholas Pok and expelled him from Transylvania. In contrast, historian Gyula Kristó argued in his 2003 publication that the skirmish between Mojs Ákos and Nicholas Pok took place already at the end of 1315. He highlighted that Nicholas last appeared as voivode in contemporary documents in April 1316. Accordingly, Nicholas Pok, who prepared a war against the Káns, arrived on a bypass road across the Meszes Gate (today in Meseș Mountains) from Lippa (today Lipova, Romania) to Transylvania because of Mojs' sudden rebellion, which interrupted and delayed the showdown against the Káns, as Kristó considered. Historian Attila Bárány supported Kristó's theory. Kádár argued Nicholas chose Meszes Gate, because he tried to mobilize his spacious kinship and the royal nobility of the northeastern part of the country in the first instance. However historian Attila Zsoldos, who also examined the contents of Nicholas Pok's charters, in addition to the dates and locations, challenged Kristó's interpretation in 2016. He argued, if, as Kristó considered, Nicholas Pok arrived to prepare a war to Transylvania immediately after his appointment, he would not have dealt with insignificant estate affairs in his diplomas as he did. Zsoldos considered, the 1318 charter, which narrated the Voivode's appointment and the following events, twisted the years and Mojs was declared the king's enemy retroactively. He argued the Meszes Gate was chosen as a safer route than the Káns' freshly occupied territory. Thus Zsoldos supported Engel's chronology and dated Mojs' rebellion to Autumn or Winter 1316.

After the defeat Nicholas had to leave Transylvania and was deposed by Charles I in the second half of 1316, or in early 1317 at the latest. Following at least one-year vacancy he was replaced by the skilled military leader Dózsa Debreceni who successfully fought against the Kán clan and Mojs Ákos and later also became Palatine of Hungary. Nicholas retired from the national politics and moved to his estate in North-Transtisza. He and his sons resided in Meggyes in February 1319. He was last mentioned alive in a diploma issued by Judge royal Lampert Hermán on 19 August 1319.

== Sources ==
- Bárány, Attila (2011). "Debreceni Dózsa küzdelme a bihari oligarchákkal [Dózsa Debreceni's Struggle with Oligarchs in Bihar]". In Bárány, Attila; Papp, Klára; Szálkai, Tamás (eds.). Debrecen város 650 éves. Várostörténeti tanulmányok (in Hungarian). Debreceni Egyetem. Történelmi Intézet. pp. 75–126. ISBN 963-821-6468.
- Engel, Pál (1988). "Az ország újraegyesítése. I. Károly küzdelmei az oligarchák ellen (1310–1323) [Reunification of the Realm. The Struggles of Charles I Against the Oligarchs (1310–1323)]". Századok (in Hungarian). 122 (1–2). Magyar Történelmi Társulat: 89–146. ISSN 0039-8098.
- Engel, Pál (1996). Magyarország világi archontológiája, 1301–1457, I. [Secular Archontology of Hungary, 1301–1457, Volume I] (in Hungarian). História, MTA Történettudományi Intézete. ISBN 963-8312-44-0.
- Engel, Pál (2001). The Realm of St Stephen: A History of Medieval Hungary, 895–1526. I.B. Tauris Publishers. ISBN 1-86064-061-3.
- Fügedi, Erik (1986). Ispánok, bárók, kiskirályok [Ispáns, Barons and Petty Kings] (in Hungarian). Magvető. ISBN 963-14-0582-6.
- Kádár, Tamás (2013). "Egy érdekes bárói életpálya a 13–14. század fordulójáról: Pok nembeli Móric fia "Meggyesi" Miklós erdélyi vajda [An Interesting Baronial Career at the Turn of the 13th and 14th Centuries: Voivode of Transylvania Nicholas "Meggyesi", son of Maurice from the Kindred Pok]". Történeti Tanulmányok. Acta Universitatis Debreceniensis (in Hungarian). 21: 133–155. ISSN 1217-4602.
- Karácsonyi, János (1901). A magyar nemzetségek a XIV. század közepéig. III. kötet [The Hungarian genera until the middle of the 14th century, Vol. 3] (in Hungarian). Hungarian Academy of Sciences.
- Kristó, Gyula (1999). "I. Károly király főúri elitje (1301–1309) [The Aristocratic Elite of King Charles I, 1301–1309]". Századok (in Hungarian). 133 (1). Magyar Történelmi Társulat: 41–62. ISSN 0039-8098.
- Kristó, Gyula (2003). "I. Károly király harcai a tartományurak ellen (1310–1323) [The Struggles of Charles I Against the Oligarchs (1310–1323)]". Századok (in Hungarian). 137 (2). Magyar Történelmi Társulat: 297–347. ISSN 0039-8098.
- Markó, László (2006). A magyar állam főméltóságai Szent Istvántól napjainkig: Életrajzi Lexikon [Great Officers of State in Hungary from King Saint Stephen to Our Days: A Biographical Encyclopedia] (in Hungarian). Helikon Kiadó. ISBN 963-208-970-7.
- Treptow, Kurt W.; Popa, Marcel (1996). Historical Dictionary of Romania. Scarecrow Press, Inc. ISBN 0-8108-3179-1.
- Zsoldos, Attila (2011). Magyarország világi archontológiája, 1000–1301 [Secular Archontology of Hungary, 1000–1301] (in Hungarian). História, MTA Történettudományi Intézete. ISBN 978-963-9627-38-3.
- Zsoldos, Attila (2016). "Erdélyi háborúk a 14. század elején [Transylvanian Wars at the Beginning of the 14th Century]". In Pósán, László; Veszprémy, László (eds.). Elfeledett háborúk. Középkori csaták és várostromok (6–16. század) (in Hungarian). Zrínyi Kiadó. pp. 198–231. ISBN 978-963-3276-96-9.

Nicholas I Genus Pok Born: c. 1245 Died: after 19 August 1319
Political offices
Preceded by Lawrence	Master of the cupbearers 1273	Succeeded by Lawrence
Preceded by Lawrence	Master of the cupbearers 1274	Succeeded by Csépán Ják
Preceded by Herbord Osl	Master of the stewards 1274–1275	Succeeded by Reynold Básztély
Preceded by Matthew Csák	Voivode of Transylvania; 1277(–1278)	Succeeded by Finta Aba
Preceded by Ladislaus Kán	Voivode of Transylvania; 1315–1316	Succeeded by Dózsa Debreceni
