= Maurice II Pok =

Hungarian nobleman

Maurice (II) Pok

Master of the treasury
- Reign: 1262–1270
- Predecessor: Csák Hahót
- Successor: Egidius Monoszló
- Born: c. 1210
- Died: 1270
- Noble family: gens Pok
- Spouse: N Rátót (d. before 1267)
- Issue: Nicholas; Maurice III; Stephen I Dominic
- Father: Maurice I

Maurice (II) from the kindred Pok (Hungarian: Pok nembeli (II.) Móric; died 1270) was a Hungarian baron in the 13th century, who served as Master of the treasury from 1262 to 1270. He was a faithful confidant and skilled soldier of King Béla IV of Hungary. The illustrious Meggyesi family descended from him.

== Family ==
Maurice II was born into the gens (clan) Pok, which possessed landholdings in Győr County in the westernmost part of Hungary. His father was Maurice I, the earliest known member of the kindred, who performed judicial activity in the court of Andrew II of Hungary and was elevated from the status of royal servants to the upper elite of the Hungarian nobility within a single generation. Maurice had two younger brothers, John – a courtier of Béla, Duke of Slavonia – and Ded.

Maurice married an unidentified daughter of Dominic I Rátót, who served as Master of the treasury and was killed in the Battle of Mohi. Through his marriage, Maurice became a relative of the influential and rich gens Rátót, promoting his social ascension beside his court career. One of his brothers-in-law was the powerful baron Roland I Rátót. Maurice's wife died sometime before 1267. Their marriage produced four sons. The eldest one was Nicholas, ancestor of the Meggyesi and Báthory families, who held positions in the royal court since the 1270s and acquired extensive landholdings and estates in the area between the rivers Tisza and Szamos (Someș), becoming one of the so-called oligarchs, who ruled de facto independently their dominion during the era of feudal anarchy by the end of the 13th century. The younger sons – Maurice III, Stephen I and Dominic – were mentioned only once in 1280 when they were excommunicated due to their involvement in the sack of Veszprém four years earlier.

== Early career ==
Maurice raised in the royal court of King Andrew II, where his father served as Master of the stewards from 1233 to 1235. There, the young Maurice received military and combat training. He grew up together with Duke Béla. He belonged to the group of so-called "royal youth" (Hungarian: királyi ifjak, Latin: iuvenis noster), who supported the monarchs and took a leading role in royal military campaigns. He already served the elderly Andrew II in some military campaigns. According to Béla IV's charter, who ascended the Hungarian throne in 1235, Maurice entered his service at the very beginning of his reign.

His earliest activity was recorded by the royal charter of Béla IV, issued in January 1246, regarding the events of the first Mongol invasion of Hungary, which took place five years earlier. Accordingly, when the Mongols stormed into Hungary in the spring of 1241, Maurice was sent to spy on the location of their camp and the size of their strength. During this act, Maurice barely escaped death. Thereafter, he took part in the disastrous Battle of Mohi on 11 April 1241. According to Béla's charter, Maurice pushed to the ground and killed a Mongol warrior with his spear, who galloped his horse to the direction of the Hungarian monarch in order to capture or kill him. After the catastrophic defeat, Béla IV and his royal companion – including Maurice – fled to the coast of the Adriatic Sea, where the monarch resided until the withdrawal of the Mongols in the next year. During that time, Maurice performed undisclosed envoy services both abroad and domestically.

== Baron of the realm ==
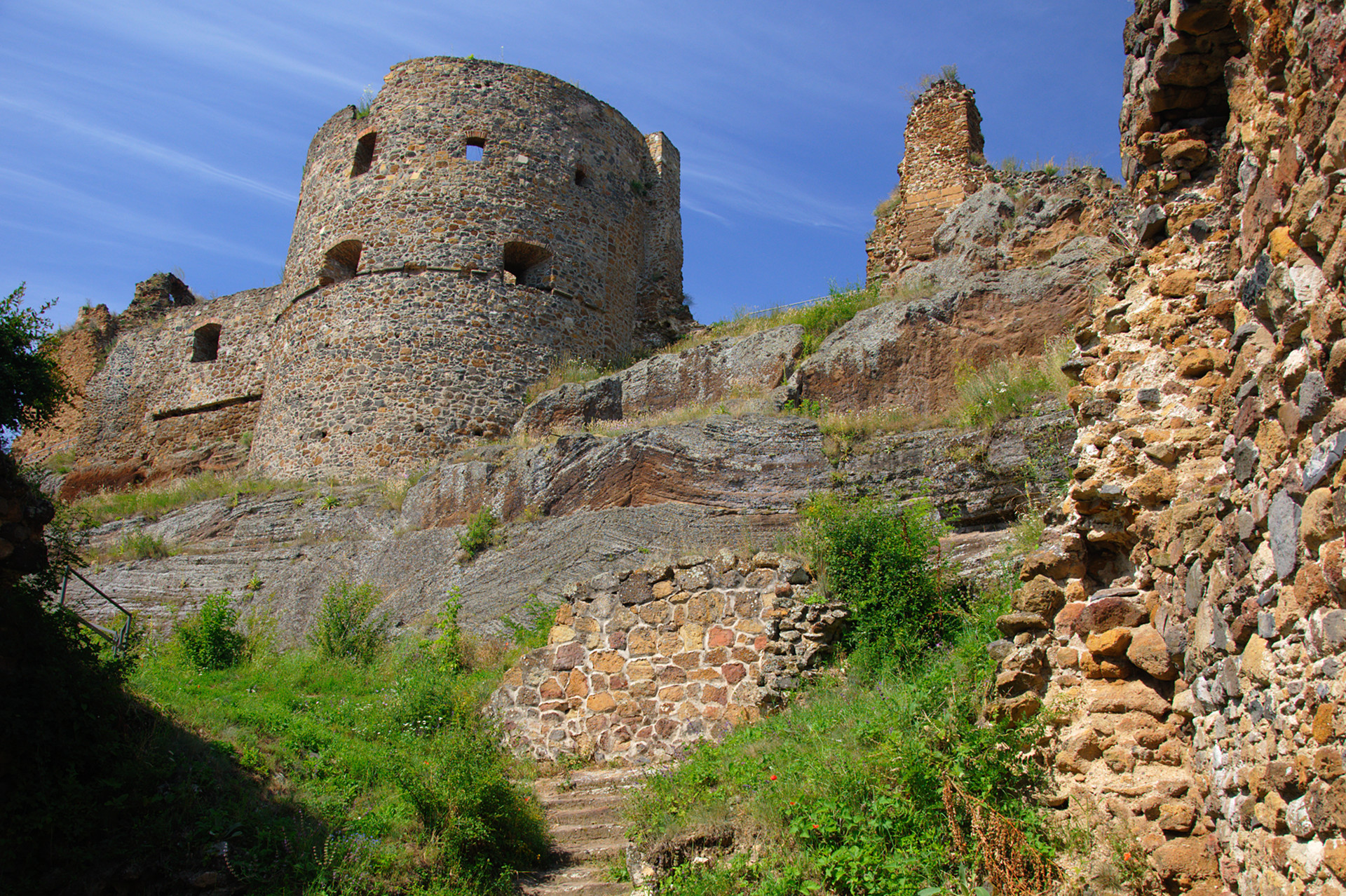
Fiľakovo (Fülek) Castle, a property of Maurice Pok between 1246 and 1262

Still residing in Dalmatia, Maurice was appointed Master of the cupbearers around March 1242, holding the dignity until at least January 1246. Beside that he also served as ispán of Győr County from 1243 to 1244 (or 1245). In this capacity, he defended the western borderlands against the raids of Frederick the Quarrelsome. It is possible he also began to fortify the ruins of Győr Castle, which was seized and demolished by the invading Mongol then Austrian troops. As a reward for his faithful service, Maurice was granted the castle of Fülek (present-day Fiľakovo, Slovakia) and its accessories, altogether seven villages, by Béla IV in January 1246; the fort previously was confiscated from Fulco Kacsics, who committed serious crimes during the Mongol invasion and thereafter. According to the donation letter, Maurice had to pay 300 marks or hand over one third part of the landholdings to Stephen Báncsa, Archbishop of Esztergom due to Fulco's former plundering attacks which caused severe damage to the archdiocese, including the devastation of the village Hatvan near Fülek Castle. Maurice donated a portion from the newly acquired areas – Simonyi (today Šimonovce, Slovakia) – to his cousin Mark in 1247. Maurice also acquired the estate Drávaszentgyörgy near the town Virovitica in Slavonia sometime before 1247. Succeeding his brother-in-law Roland Rátót, Maurice served as Master of the stewards between 1246 and 1247, but it is possible he held the dignity until no later than 1251. Beside that, he was also ispán of Nyitra County from 1246 to 1261, for an unprecedent period of fifteen years.

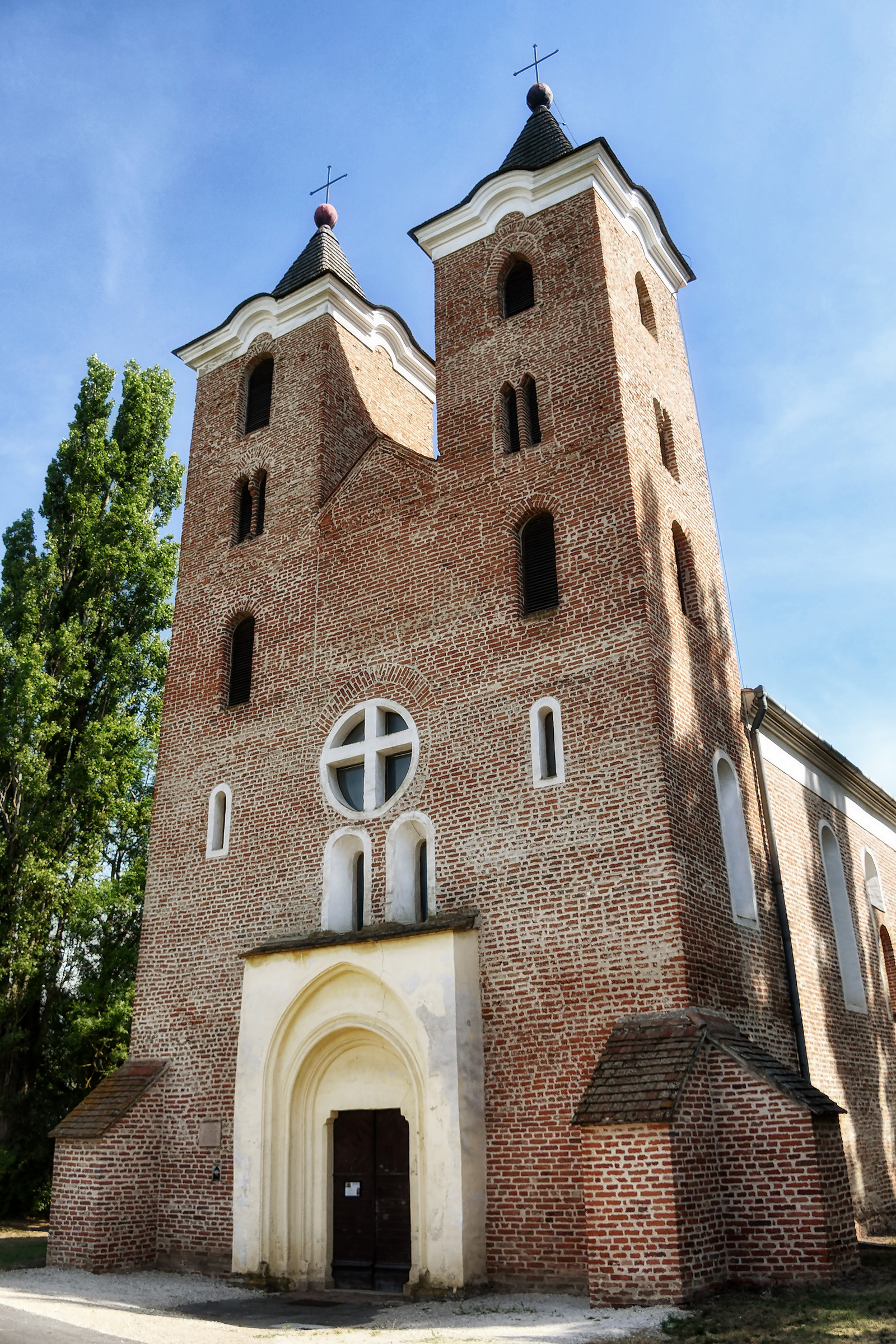
The St. James church lays between Mórichida and Árpás, founded and constructed by Maurice Pok

Based on sources, Maurice lived his devout religiosity deeply. Sometime between 1235 and 1251, he participated in the foundation of the Pok clan's common monastery in their namesake ancient village Pok (near Tét) in Győr County. The members of the kindred invited Premonstratensians and the provostry was dedicated to Saint Stephen, the Protomartyr. In 1251, Maurice alone established another Premonstratensian monastery in the land between Árpás and his own estate Mórichida (lit. "Maurice's Bridge", named after his father), dedicated to Saint James the Apostle. Maurice's donations, including port and trade duties at Mórichida, to his new abbey covered the southwest corner of the Pok's landholdings along the right bank of the Rába river. His cousin Mark also participated in the foundation, but contemporaries emphasized Maurice's leading role and called the new provostry simply as "Magister Maurice's Monastery". With the foundation of a new monastery, Maurice demonstrated his social ascension and separated himself and his immediate family – the Mórichida branch – from the other, less significant and rich branches of the Pok clan. Béla IV confirmed the donations in 1263, after Abbot Favus of Pannonhalma determined the borders of the possessions upon his order. Maurice also began to use his own seal depicted flowers. His permanent residence, a fortified manor was located in Mórichida, which was visited by his brother-in-law, Palatine Roland Rátót in 1256. Fulfilling the last testament of his deceased wife, Maurice donated the tenth part of the river duty at Drávaszentgyörgy to the Premonstratensian friars of Mórichida in 1267, in order to redound her spiritual salvation.

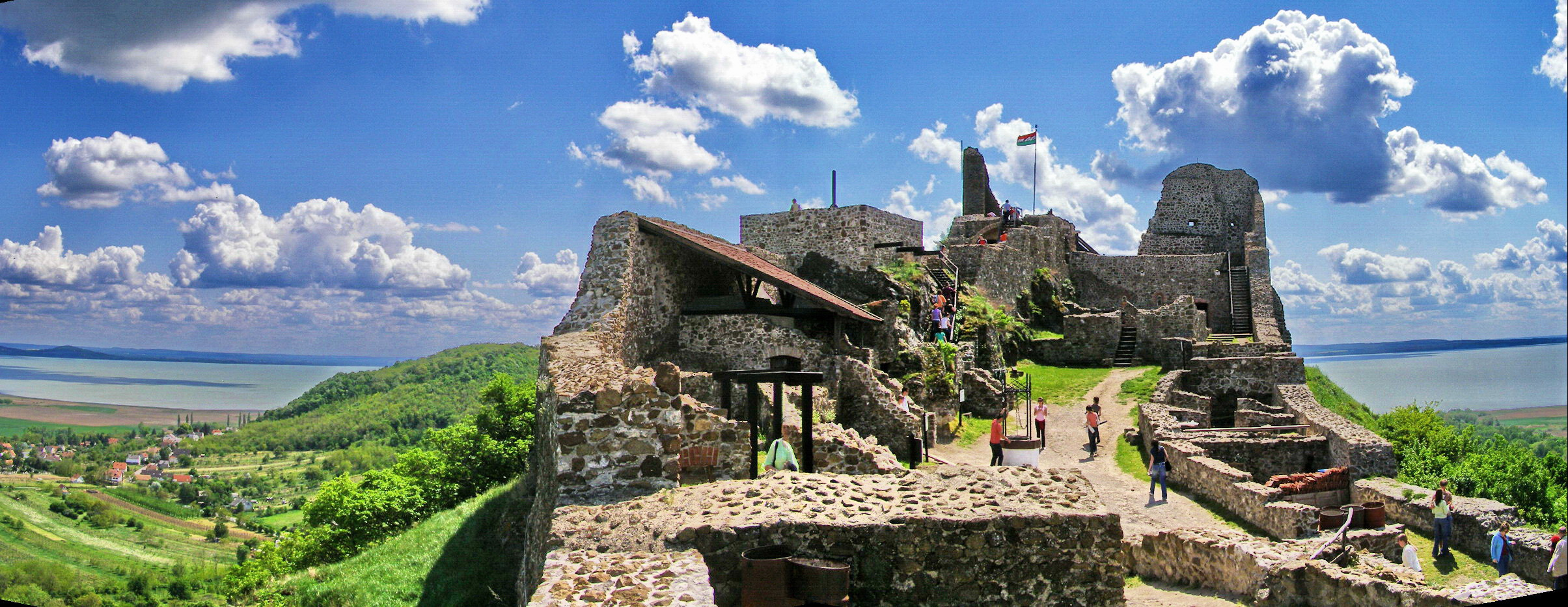
The castle of Szigliget, which was owned by Maurice and his descendants from the 1260s until the mid-15th century with brief interruptions

By the 1250s, Maurice became a stable pillar of King Béla's government in the royal court. While retained his office in Nyitra County, Maurice served as count (head) of the court of queen consort Maria Laskarina from 1251 to 1259. Beside the place of his origin, Maurice acquired lands and estates in various regions of the Kingdom of Hungary since the 1250s, including Nyitra County, Transylvania and Slavonia, consequently he did not own a single coherent and extensive lordship. Maurice was installed as the owner of the land Szigliget in 1258. According to the land contract, Maurice was adopted by one of his childless female relative Bona, the widow of Ladislaus Atyusz, then comes Botond Ventei, who bequeathed the half part of the estate to her adopted son. Maurice exchanged his possession Bánd for the other half part with the Almád Abbey, acquiring the whole landholding, around which many of his estates spread. However, the illustrious Szigliget Castle was built by another owner in the region, the Pannonhalma Abbey around 1260. It is possible that Béla IV did not want his confidant to own another castle beside Fülek, or Pannonhalma and its abbot Favus proved to be richer. Despite that, Maurice was granted the newly built castle by Béla IV sometime after 1262, possibly as a compensation due to the loss of Fülek (see below). Maurice also bought the Vatasomlyó lordship (present-day Șimleu Silvaniei, Romania) in the region of Szilágyság (Sălaj) in 1258; this landholding in the northern part of Transylvania became the main basis of his son Nicholas' oligarchic domain by the end of the 13th century. He also owned a portion in Szenice in Nyitra County (present-day Senica, Slovakia), which he acquired when he administered the county.

Sometime in the mid-1250s, Béla IV donated Güssing Castle (Németújvár) to Maurice and his two brothers, John and Ded in order to protect the fort, which laid along the western border, against the plundering raids of Ottokar II of Bohemia, who forced Béla to renounce Styria during their war. Maurice and his brothers successfully defended the fortress; they ever erected a tower and other buildings in the upper castle ("in castro superiori") at their own expense. For their merits, the Hungarian monarch donated two surrounding estates to them in 1263, separating both lands from the accessories of the royal castle of Vasvár. Maurice's potential active political and military involvement in the 1260s civil war between Béla IV and his eldest son and heir Duke Stephen is uncertain. According to historian Ferenc Jenei, he distanced himself from the conflict. Following their first clash in 1262, Stephen forced his father to cede all the lands of the Hungary to the east of the Danube to him and adopted the title of junior king. In accordance with the Peace of Pressburg, Maurice had to hand over Fülek Castle to the duke in that year. Maurice served as Master of the treasury from 1262 until his death. He was also referred to as ispán of Bács County in 1262. He was delegated as judge to various committees of inquiry on behalf of Béla IV in the period between 1263 and 1266. He functioned as ispán of Baranya County from around 1265 or 1266 to 1268, when the territory belonged to the dukedom of Béla of Slavonia, the king's favorite son. Maurice Pok died in 1270, in the same year as the royal couple.

== Sources ==
- Béli, Gábor (2013). "Vagyongyűjtő nagyurak IV. Béla idején [Lords' Acquisition During Béla IV]". Rubicon Online (in Hungarian). 24 (5).
- F. Romhányi, Beatrix (2000). Kolostorok és társaskáptalanok a középkori Magyarországon: Katalógus [Monasteries and Collegiate Chapters in Medieval Hungary: A Catalogue] (in Hungarian). Pytheas. ISBN 963-7483-07-1.
- Horváth, Richárd (2015). "A favár rejtélye, avagy mennyire régi Újvár vára?: Németújvár várának "vélelmezett" története a kezdetektől a 13. század végéig [The Mystery of the Wooden Fort, or How Old is Újvár?: The "Presumed" History of the Castle of Németújvár from the Beginning to the End of the 13th Century]". Castrum (in Hungarian). 18 (1–2). Castrum Bene Egyesület: 5–24. ISSN 1787-1093.
- Jenei, Ferenc (1939). "Pok Móric mester, győri főispán [Master Maurice Pok, Ispán of Győr County]". Dunántúli Hírlap (in Hungarian). 47: 1–11.
- Karácsonyi, János (1901). A magyar nemzetségek a XIV. század közepéig. II. kötet [The Hungarian genera until the middle of the 14th century, Vol. 2] (in Hungarian). Hungarian Academy of Sciences.
- Kristó, Gyula, ed. (2000). Középkori históriák oklevelekben (1002–1410) [Medieval Stories in Charters (1002–1410)] (in Hungarian). Szegedi Középkorász Műhely. ISBN 963-482-423-4.
- Markó, László (2006). A magyar állam főméltóságai Szent Istvántól napjainkig: Életrajzi Lexikon [Great Officers of State in Hungary from King Saint Stephen to Our Days: A Biographical Encyclopedia] (in Hungarian). Helikon Kiadó. ISBN 963-208-970-7.
- Mészáros, Orsolya (2005). "Szigliget várának története a középkorban [History of Szigliget Castle in the Middle Ages]". Fons. 12 (3). Szentpétery Imre Történettudományi Alapítvány: 299–377. ISSN 1217-8020.
- Szűcs, Jenő (2002). Az utolsó Árpádok [The Last Árpáds] (in Hungarian). Osiris Kiadó. ISBN 963-389-271-6.
- Zsoldos, Attila (1998). "Közszabad nemzetségek [The Middle Privileged Clans]". Mediævalia Transilvanica. 2 (1): 43–60. ISSN 1453-8520.
- Zsoldos, Attila (2011). Magyarország világi archontológiája, 1000–1301 [Secular Archontology of Hungary, 1000–1301] (in Hungarian). História, MTA Történettudományi Intézete. ISBN 978-963-9627-38-3.

Maurice II Genus Pok Born: ? Died: 1270
Political offices
Preceded by Roland Rátót	Master of the cupbearers 1242–1246	Succeeded by Baldwin Rátót
Preceded by Roland Rátót	Master of the stewards 1246–1247/51	Succeeded by Nicholas Budmér
Preceded by Csák Hahót	Master of the treasury 1262–1270	Succeeded by Egidius Monoszló
