= Maurice I Pok =

Hungarian nobleman

Maurice (I) Pok

Master of the stewards
- Reign: 1233–1235
- Predecessor: File Szeretvai
- Successor: Michael Bána
- Died: after 1235
- Noble family: gens Pok
- Issue: Maurice II; John; Ded

Maurice (I) from the kindred Pok (Hungarian: Pok nembeli (I.) Móric; died after 1235) was a Hungarian noble in the first half of the 13th century, who had ascended to the upper elite from a lower social status as the faithful confidant of Andrew II of Hungary. He was the forefather of the prestigious Meggyesi family.

== Vice-palatine ==
Maurice is the earliest known member of the gens (clan) Pok and was born into the social status of royal servants. Maurice was first mentioned by contemporary records in 1219. He served as vice-palatine in the period between 1220 and 1221, under the first tenure of Palatine Nicholas Szák, a high-impact reformer of the royal dignity. He succeeded a certain Petus in this position. Maurice's name was recorded by the Regestrum Varadinense in various occasions in this capacity, when he functioned as a pristaldus (commissioner or "bailiff") for his superior in various lawsuits and legal acts. This suggest that the palatine and his deputies administered justice during the same period but in faraway territories: while Palatine Nicholas Szák heard cases in the lands east of the river Tisza, his deputies, including Maurice, worked in Transdanubia in 1220. Maurice was styled as in various forms ("vicepalatinus", "palatini comitis viceiudex", "vicecomes palatini comitis" and "vicarius palatini comitis"), which indicates that they are in fact still immature titles of a recently formed position in the royal court.

He was succeeded by a certain Martin in 1221, but it is also conceivable that several persons – File Szeretvai, Petus, Maurice and Martin – held the position in parallel during these years. Thereafter, Maurice registered new owners to their acquired lands in Sopron County, when he was pristaldus for King Andrew II himself there in 1220 and 1223 (when inducted Simon of Aragon to the possession of Röjtökör).

== Social ascension ==
These assignments enabled him to ascend socially. It is plausible that he (or his unidentified ancestor) was granted the ancient estates of the kindred – including the eponymous village Pok (or Puk), which laid near Győr in Western Hungary. Mórichida (lit. "Maurice's Bridge") in the same region was named after him, where he erected a bridge over the river Rába. He had a namesake son Maurice II, who had become an influential advisor of King Béla IV of Hungary after the 1241 Mongol invasion and his kinship rapidly elevated into one of the most powerful families in Hungary. The clan's Mórichida branch and its cadet branch, the Meggyesi family ascended from him. Maurice I's grandson was the influential provincial lord Nicholas Pok, who acquired large-scale domains in Northern Transylvania and Carpathian Ruthenia at the turn of the 13th and 14th centuries. Maurice I also had two another sons, John – a courtier of Béla, Duke of Slavonia – and Ded. Whether Amadeus Pok, Bishop of Győr or Thomas Pok, Master of the doorkeepers were also the children of Maurice I, is unknown.

Within a decade, Maurice I himself became a baron in the royal court of Andrew II. By 20 August 1233, he was installed as Master of the stewards, when he was present among the King's companion in the forests of Bereg, where Andrew II vowed that he would not employ Jews and Muslims to administrate royal revenues. He was also styled as ispán of Moson County from 1234. He held both offices until 1235. Around autumn, he was succeeded by Michael Bána in both positions. It is possible Maurice died by then, or lost political influence completely, when Andrew's son and opponent Béla had practically already taken control of the country before the death of his ailing father in September. According to the contemporary Roger of Torre Maggiore, Béla IV dismissed and punished many of his late father's closest advisors after his coronation, perhaps Maurice was one of them.

== Sources ==
- Horváth, Richárd (2015). "A favár rejtélye, avagy mennyire régi Újvár vára?: Németújvár várának "vélelmezett" története a kezdetektől a 13. század végéig [The Mystery of the Wooden Fort, or How Old is Újvár?: The "Presumed" History of the Castle of Németújvár from the Beginning to the End of the 13th Century]". Castrum (in Hungarian). 18 (1–2). Castrum Bene Egyesület: 5–24. ISSN 1787-1093.
- Karácsonyi, János (1901). A magyar nemzetségek a XIV. század közepéig. II. kötet [The Hungarian genera until the middle of the 14th century, Vol. 2] (in Hungarian). Hungarian Academy of Sciences.
- Szőcs, Tibor (2014). A nádori intézmény korai története, 1000–1342 [An Early History of the Palatinal Institution: 1000–1342] (in Hungarian). Magyar Tudományos Akadémia Támogatott Kutatások Irodája. ISBN 978-963-508-697-9.
- Zsoldos, Attila (1998). "Közszabad nemzetségek [The Middle Privileged Clans]". Mediævalia Transilvanica. 2 (1): 43–60. ISSN 1453-8520.
- Zsoldos, Attila (2011). Magyarország világi archontológiája, 1000–1301 [Secular Archontology of Hungary, 1000–1301] (in Hungarian). História, MTA Történettudományi Intézete. ISBN 978-963-9627-38-3.

Maurice I Genus Pok Born: ? Died: after 1235
Political offices
Preceded by File Szeretvai	Master of the stewards 1233–1235	Succeeded by Michael Bána
