= Gallus (bishop of Transylvania) =

Hungarian prelate

- Bishop of Transylvania
- Installed: 1246
- Term ended: 1269
- Predecessor: Artolf
- Successor: Peter Monoszló

Personal details
- Died: 1269 or 1270
- Denomination: Catholic

Gallus (Hungarian: Gál; died 1269 or 1270) was a Hungarian prelate in the 13th century, who served as the Bishop of Transylvania from 1246 until his death. He made serious efforts to repopulate his diocese after the First Mongol invasion of Hungary.

== Election ==
It is possible he is identical with that namesake cleric, who functioned as guardian (custos) of the collegiate chapter of Székesfehérvár from 1243 to 1244. During his election, Gallus held the title of provost, but it is not known which cathedral or collegiate chapter he was the head of. His predecessor Artolf was transferred to the Diocese of Győr in the autumn of 1245. A royal charter refers to the Diocese of Transylvania as sede vacante (episcopal vacancy) on 12 December 1245. Gallus was elected as bishop by the cathedral chapter of Transylvania sometime in late 1245 or the early months of 1246. His name first appears in contemporary records in May 1246.

Since the Mongol invasion of 1241–1242, the office was virtually vacant (the appointment of Artolf had been more formal than factual). Voivode Lawrence thus lacked the support of some of the most important pillars in restoring order and royal power and managed the church's properties in Transylvania himself under secular control. The election of Gallus marked the end of the state of emergency in the province.

== Bishop ==
On his very first appearance in sources in May 1246, Gallus successfully requested King Béla IV of Hungary to exempt the free people and guest settlers (hospes) of the episcopal see Gyulafehérvár (present-day Alba Iulia, Romania) and the bishopric's other landholdings – Harina and Bilak in Doboka County, Gyalu in Kolozs County, Zilah and Tasnád in Szolnok County (present-day Herina, Domnești, Gilău, Zalău and Tășnad in Romania, respectively) – from the jurisdiction of the Voivode of Transylvania (and other secular officials) and assign them to the diocese's own court, and in complicated cases directly to the king's tribunal. This was part of the re-colonization project following the Mongol invasion Gallus consistently championed, which was only possible with privileges like this. The reconstruction of the Gyulafehérvár Cathedral started during Gallus' episcopate too, however it took place at a slow pace and was finished only under Gallus' successor, Peter Monoszló.

Gallus tried to improve the financial background of his clerics. Upon his request, Pope Alexander IV permitted to attach the income of two churches or chapels belonging to the bishopric to the canons' emoluments (benefice) in April 1257. Gallus assigned the income of the parsonage of Vinc to Ivánka, the archdeacon of Sásvár, who was struggling with financial problems. This was confirmed by Pope Urban IV in March 1264. Gallus was considered a strong confidant of the Holy See. Pope Innocent IV entrusted him in September 1247 – together with his metropolitan Archbishop Benedict of Kalocsa and Bulcsú Lád, Bishop of Csanád – to find a new episcopal see for the Diocese of Syrmia, because the Mongols devastated the former see Kő monastery (present-day Banoštor, Serbia). In April 1264, Pope Urban IV instructed Gallus to absolve a certain Transylvanian pastor Stephen, who was accused of manslaughter, from ecclesiastical punishments, if he really only committed his act in self-defense. Gallus also contributed to the transcription of the privilege letter of the collegiate chapter of Buda. He took part in the national synod of Esztergom in 1256. However, when the papal legate Angelus convened a synod to Buda in April 1263, Gallus did not appear in person, he only sent his representatives to the meeting.

During his long-standing episcopal tenure, Gallus stayed away from political and secular affairs. Nevertheless, he was a confidant of the royal court. King Béla IV commissioned Gallus and Ákos, the provost of Buda in 1254 to investigate a conflict between the Bakonybél Abbey and its local secular servants. After December 1262, when Béla IV was forced to partition the kingdom with his rebellious son Duke Stephen, the territory of the Diocese of Transylvania belonged to Stephen's realm. Upon Gallus' request, the duke confirmed his father's previous privilege letter regarding discounts for legal proceedings for the subjects of the bishopric already in 1262. In addition, Stephen donated Kolozsvár (today Cluj-Napoca, Romania) to the diocese (this was later confirmed by Stephen V, now as king in 1270).

Gallus is last mentioned as a living person in 1269 by a royal charter of Béla IV. He died soon, as Peter Monoszló was elected as his successor in the first months of 1270, still before the death of Béla IV.

== Sources ==
- Sălăgean, Tudor (2016). Transylvania in the Second Half of the Thirteenth Century: The Rise of the Congregational System. East Central and Eastern Europe in the Middle Ages 450–1450. Vol. 37. Leiden and Boston: Brill. ISBN 978-90-04-24362-0.
- Temesváry, János (1922). Erdély középkori püspökei [Medieval Bishops of Transylvania] (in Hungarian). Minerva Irodalmi és Nyomdai Műintézet.
- Zsoldos, Attila (2011). Magyarország világi archontológiája, 1000–1301 [Secular Archontology of Hungary, 1000–1301] (in Hungarian). História, MTA Történettudományi Intézete. ISBN 978-963-9627-38-3.

Catholic Church titles
| Preceded by Artolf | Bishop of Transylvania; 1246–1269 | Succeeded by Peter Monoszló |
