= Amadeus Pok =

Hungarian bishop

- Bishop of Győr
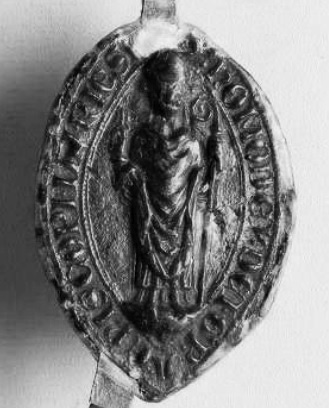
- Seal of Amadeus Pok, 1256
- Appointed: 1254
- Term ended: 1267
- Predecessor: Artolf
- Successor: Farkas Bejc
- Other post: Provost of Vasvár

Personal details
- Died: 1267 or 1268
- Education: University of Bologna

Amadeus from the kindred Pok (Hungarian: Pok nembeli Amadé; died 1267 or 1268) was a Hungarian prelate in the 13th century, who served as Bishop of Győr from 1254 until his death.

== Background ==
Amadeus was born into the wealthy and powerful gens (clan) Pok, which possessed large-scale landholdings in Győr County, but his parentage is unknown. He was a contemporary to his distant relative, Maurice II. He was a "frater" (close relative) of Ded and comes John, and he also had two nephews, Paul and Peter, both entered ecclesiastical service and the former was archdeacon of Sopron. Historian Ferenc Jenei translated the Latin phrase as "brother", consequently he considered Amadeus was the son of Maurice I too.

Amadeus attended the University of Bologna and obtained the terminal degree of doctor of canon law. Returning to Hungary, he served as provost of the collegiate chapter of Vasvár from around 1249 to 1253, a royal church, which also functioned as a place of authentication.

== Bishop of Győr ==
After a two-year period of vacancy, Amadeus was elected Bishop of Győr by the cathedral chapter sometime before the spring of 1254, but it is plausible he took the dignity already at the turn of 1252 and 1253, based on a papal document regarding the subsequent dispute over the benefice at the chapter of Vasvár. Since the late 17th-century, some historiographical works and scholars (for instance, Márton Szentiványi and György Pray) incorrectly claimed that a certain George served as Bishop of Győr during the 1250–1260s. He was a confidant of Béla IV of Hungary, who petitioned to the Roman Curia in order to confirm his election by Pope Innocent IV. In his letter, King Béla IV referred to his conflict and the tense relationship with Ottokar II of Bohemia, which caused the permanent hostile raids at the western boundaries between Hungary and Austria. Due to his family background and wealth, Amadeus was able to protect his chapter, then diocese in the region, similarly to his predecessor, Artolf.

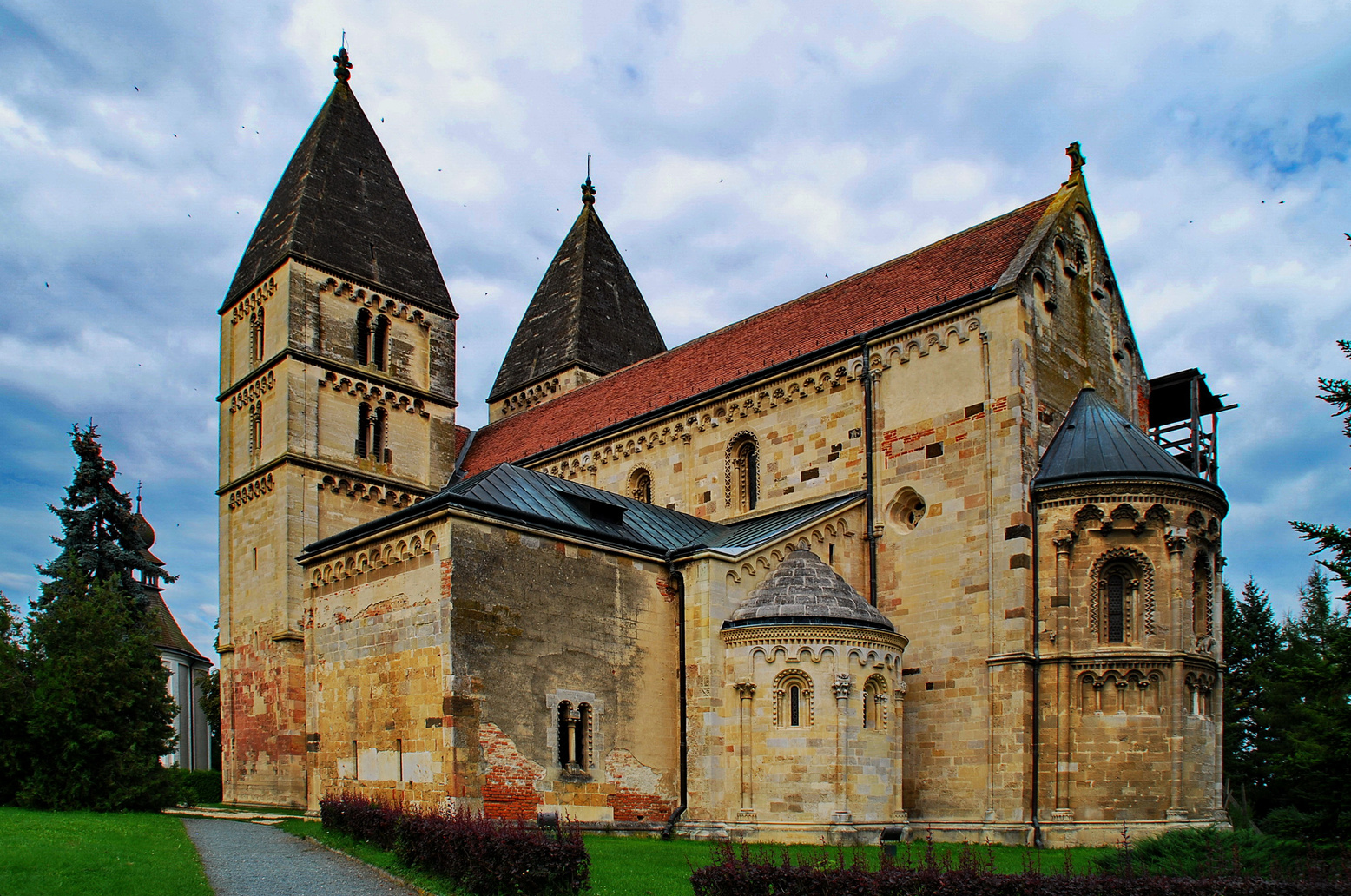
The parish church of Ják, consecrated by Amadeus Pok in 1256

The Peace of Pressburg, which was signed on 1 May 1254 and ceded Styria to Hungary, ended the war situation in the region, which lasted more than a decade, thus Amadeus could start his episcopate under calm and relatively peaceful conditions. In the territory of his diocese and the northwestern part of Transdanubia, Amadeus took part in that process, when Béla IV set up special commissions which revised all royal charters of land grants made after 1196. During the implementation of Béla's land reform in the first half of the 1250s, Amadeus frequently acted as co-judge in various lawsuits and border determinations in his diocese, alongside secular barons and his deputy, the archdeacon of Rábaköz. During his activity, Amadeus recovered several landholdings and estates for the Crown. He restored law and administration in the region, which had collapsed after the Mongol invasion and the subsequent Austrian and Bohemian raids. For his advice, Béla IV settled the customs and port duties in Győr and the surrounding area (for instance, Abda and Füzitő), and restored the right to hold markets to Széplak, which was owned by the gens Osl before Lawrence Aba, the ispán of Sopron County arbitrarily moved the privilege to his own nearby estate Hegykő. Amadeus consecrated the parish church of Ják on 24 April 1256, today the most complete Romanesque cathedral in Hungary. Beside Amadeus, Abbot Favus of Pannonhalma and comes Abraham also participated in the process, after being present at the scene as judges. The internal peace had broken, when the Styrian noblemen rose up in rebellion against the Hungarian rule in 1258, which caused a war between Béla and Ottokar until 1260.

In June 1254, Amadeus filed a lawsuit against the burghers of Sopron over the property right of port duties in Fertőrákos at Lake Fertő (Neusiedl). During the dispute, he even excommunicated the magistrates of the town and placed Sopron under interdict. The litigants were summoned to the judicial court of Béla IV, who judged in favor of the diocese. Thereafter bailiff (royal commissioner) Herbord Osl and a delegate of the Pannonhalma Abbey were sent to draft the custom borders in the region. Amadeus adopted new regulations to the cathedral chapter of Győr and smoothed the contrasts between the canons and the lower clergy. He started to reconstruct his episcopal seat, the Cathedral Basilica of the Assumption of Our Lady, which has been severely damaged during the Mongol invasion. It is plausible the cathedral was redesigned to Romanesque architectural style during his bishopric too, according to 17th-century historian and prelate István Telekessy, but archaeological excavations and subsequent chronological studies do not confirm his hypothesis. He also permitted the rebuilding of the parish church of Lébény, which was destroyed by Ottokar's troops in the early 1250s. After the death of Saul Győr, the archdeacon of Sopron, Amadeus installed his nephew Peter as his successor in 1263. Despite that Pope Urban IV donated this benefice to a foreign cleric, a certain Irenaeus. Amadeus prevented him from occupying his position. He even refused to appoint the cleric, when Archbishop Smaragd of Kalocsa ordered him on behalf of the pope. As a result, Smaragd excommunicated Amadeus Pok and Irenaeus filed a lawsuit against his superior. Pope Urban commissioned the Hungarian cardinal Stephen Báncsa to investigate the dispute. After a personal hearing, Peter could retain his position, but Amadeus had to find a properly profitable office (with an annual income of at least 25 marks) for Irenaeus in his diocese.

Amadeus attended the national synods in Esztergom (1256) and Buda (1263). In the latter meeting, Amadeus was entrusted to write the topics that arise. His charter also preserved the harsh dispute between Philip Türje, Archbishop of Esztergom and Job Záh, Bishop of Pécs over the former's supremacy. Amadeus distanced himself in the conflict between Béla IV and his son Duke Stephen in the 1260s, and did not interfere in secular affairs nor hold dignity in the royal court. Pope Urban instructed Amadeus, alongside Philip Türje and Paul Balog, to force Duke Stephen, even with ecclesiastical censure, to respect the property rights of his family members – primarily, Anna of Macsó and her sons – in the territory of his realm. He was last mentioned as a living person in August 1267, when he permitted to the settlers of Vitéz in Moson County to build a stone church. He died by April 1268, when his successor Farkas Bejc already appeared as bishop-elect.

== Sources ==
- Bánk, József, ed. (1968). Győregyházmegyei almanach. Schematizmus Dioecesis Jaurinensis [Almanac of the Diocese of Győr] (in Hungarian). Authority of the Diocese of Győr.
- Barabás, Gábor (2023). Delegated Papal Jurisdiction in Arpadian Hungary. Bishops – provosts – papal chaplains. Arpadiana XVI., Research Centre for the Humanities. ISBN 978-963-416-405-0.
- Győri, Éva (2008). "Győri püspökök a XIII. században [The Bishops of Győr in the 13th Century]". Belvedere Meridionale (in Hungarian). 20 (1–2): 24–43. ISSN 1419-0222.
- Jenei, Ferenc (1939). "Pok nb. Omode győri püspök emlékezete [The Memory of Amadeus Pok, Bishop of Győr]". Győri Szemle (in Hungarian). 10 (3): 3–12.
- Karácsonyi, János (1901). A magyar nemzetségek a XIV. század közepéig. II. kötet [The Hungarian genera until the middle of the 14th century, Vol. 2] (in Hungarian). Hungarian Academy of Sciences.
- Zsoldos, Attila (2011). Magyarország világi archontológiája, 1000–1301 [Secular Archontology of Hungary, 1000–1301] (in Hungarian). História, MTA Történettudományi Intézete. ISBN 978-963-9627-38-3.

Amadeus Genus Pok Born: ? Died: 1267 or 1268
Catholic Church titles
Preceded by Artolf	Bishop of Győr; 1254–1267	Succeeded by Farkas Bejc
