= Artolf =

Hungarian prelate

- Bishop of Győr
- Appointed: 1245
- Term ended: 1252
- Predecessor: Benedict Osl
- Successor: Amadeus Pok
- Other post: Bishop of Transylvania

Personal details
- Died: 1252

Artolf, also Aistulf, Arnolphus or Atolf (died 1252) was a Hungarian prelate in the first half of the 13th century, who served as Bishop of Transylvania from 1244 to 1245, then Bishop of Győr from 1245 until his death.

== Biography ==
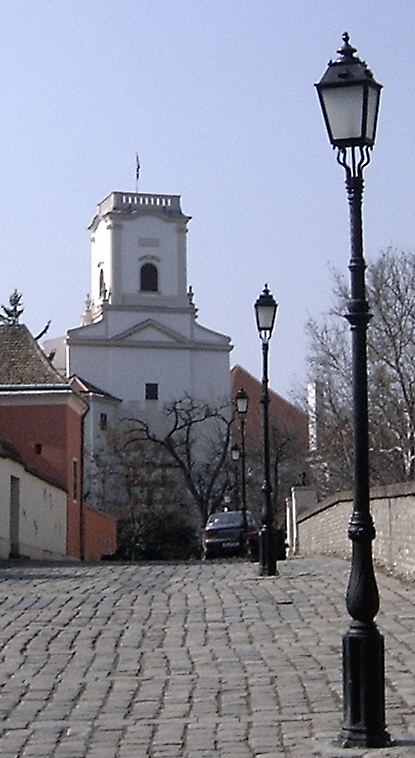
The tower of the episcopal castle of Győr, built by Bishop Artolf

Artolf (or Artolph) was born into an unidentified wealthy Hungarian noble family, which possessed large-scale landholdings in Transdanubia. The Schematizmus dioecesis Jauriensis refers to him as Artolf and Aistulf, simultaneously, while other documents also mention the name variants of Arnolphus and Atolf. Artolf was an educated prelate and skilled in theology and science. He was styled as provost of Vác in 1237.

Artolf was appointed Bishop of Transylvania around June 1244 by Béla IV of Hungary, who filled the dignity after a three-year period vacancy, which lasted from the death of Raynald of Belleville, who was killed in the Battle of Mohi on 11 April 1241. During their invasion, the Mongols completely devastated and perished the province of Transylvania, along with its diocese and church property (including the cathedral). Artolf's task was to begin the restoration of the diocese's administrative and financial positions, but the lack of local knowledge and the shocking experience of the destruction exceeded his suitability.

Around September 1245, the cathedral chapter of Győr elected Artolf as their bishop. Leaving the remote and war-torn Transylvania, he pleased to occupy the position, as the several lands of his family laid in the territory of the diocese. King Béla IV interceded Pope Innocent IV in order to transfer Artolf from Transylvania to Győr. The monarch called his protege as "popular, clean-lived, educated and principled", while argued, "the army of his powerful and influential kinship will be useful for the Crown against the hostile raids at the western boundaries of the kingdom". The remark obviously referred to the emerging tension between Béla IV and Frederick the Quarrelsome, Duke of Austria. The pope contributed to the change and translated Artolf to the Diocese of Győr on 12 December 1245. Pope Innocent mandated Artolf and two other clerics to implement the subordination of the Diocese of Bosnia to the Archdiocese of Kalocsa in August 1247.

Artolf's bishopric became a buffer zone between the Kingdom of Hungary and the Duchy of Austria in the upcoming years. He was responsible for to protect the frontier in Western Hungary. It is presumable that Artolf built the tower of the episcopal castle of Győr. Artolf was last mentioned as a living person by contemporary records in November 1251. During his episcopal tenure, the bishop of Aquino, who lent a large sum of money to the Diocese of Győr, demanded 6 marks of silver per annum from the bishopric, which formerly had been acknowledged by Artolf himself. However, he failed to comply with this, thus Pope Innocent mandated Hungarian clerics to enforce the payment in September 1252. Artolf died by that time.

== Sources ==
- Bánk, József, ed. (1968). Győregyházmegyei almanach. Schematizmus Dioecesis Jaurinensis [Almanac of the Diocese of Győr] (in Hungarian). Authority of the Diocese of Győr.
- Barabás, Gábor (2023). Delegated Papal Jurisdiction in Arpadian Hungary. Bishops – provosts – papal chaplains. Arpadiana XVI., Research Centre for the Humanities. ISBN 978-963-416-405-0.
- C. Tóth, Norbert (2023). A váci székeskáptalan archontológiája, 1200–1543 [Archontology of the Cathedral Chapter of Vác, 1200–1543] (in Hungarian). Subsidia ad historiam medii aevi Hungariae inquirendam 16., National Archives of Hungary. ISSN 1787-9213.
- Diós, István (1993). Magyar katolikus lexikon [Hungarian Catholic Lexicon] Vol. I (in Hungarian). Szent István Kiadó. ISBN 963-3607-18-3.
- Győri, Éva (2008). "Győri püspökök a XIII. században [The Bishops of Győr in the 13th Century]". Belvedere Meridionale (in Hungarian). 20 (1–2): 24–43. ISSN 1419-0222.
- Temesváry, János (1922). Erdély középkori püspökei [Medieval Bishops of Transylvania] (in Hungarian). Minerva Irodalmi és Nyomdai Műintézet.
- Zsoldos, Attila (2011). Magyarország világi archontológiája, 1000–1301 [Secular Archontology of Hungary, 1000–1301] (in Hungarian). História, MTA Történettudományi Intézete. ISBN 978-963-9627-38-3.

Catholic Church titles
Previous: Raynald of Belleville	Bishop of Transylvania; 1244–1245	Succeeded by Gallus
Preceded by Benedict Osl	Bishop of Győr; 1245–1252	Succeeded by Amadeus Pok
