= Dózsa Debreceni =

Dózsa (I) Debreceni

Palatine of Hungary
- Reign: 1322
- Predecessor: Dominic Rátót
- Successor: Philip Drugeth
- Died: 1322 or 1323
- Noble family: House of Debreceni
- Issue: 6 sons a daughter
- Father: Andrew I

Dózsa Debreceni, or Dózsa of Debrecen (died in 1322 or 1323), was an influential lord in the Kingdom of Hungary in the early 14th century. He was Palatine in 1322, and Voivode of Transylvania between 1318 and 1321. He was one of the staunchest supporters of Charles I of Hungary.

== Sources ==
- Bárány, Attila (2011). "Debreceni Dózsa küzdelme a bihari oligarchákkal [Dózsa Debreceni's Struggle with Oligarchs in Bihar]". In Bárány, Attila; Papp, Klára; Szálkai, Tamás (eds.). Debrecen város 650 éves. Várostörténeti tanulmányok (in Hungarian). Debreceni Egyetem. Történelmi Intézet. pp. 75–126. ISBN 978-963-821-6465.
- Engel, Pál (1988). "Az ország újraegyesítése. I. Károly küzdelmei az oligarchák ellen (1310–1323) [Reunification of the Realm. The Struggles of Charles I Against the Oligarchs (1310–1323)]". Századok (in Hungarian). 122 (1–2). Magyar Történelmi Társulat: 89–146. ISSN 0039-8098.
- Engel, Pál (1996). Magyarország világi archontológiája, 1301–1457, I. [Secular Archontology of Hungary, 1301–1457, Volume I] (in Hungarian). História, MTA Történettudományi Intézete. ISBN 963-8312-44-0.
- Engel, Pál (2001). The Realm of St Stephen: A History of Medieval Hungary, 895–1526. I.B. Tauris Publishers. ISBN 1-86064-061-3.
- Kristó, Gyula (2003). "I. Károly király harcai a tartományurak ellen (1310–1323) [The Struggles of Charles I Against the Oligarchs (1310–1323)]". Századok (in Hungarian). 137 (2). Magyar Történelmi Társulat: 297–347. ISSN 0039-8098.
- Markó, László (2006). A magyar állam főméltóságai Szent Istvántól napjainkig: Életrajzi Lexikon [Great Officers of State in Hungary from King Saint Stephen to Our Days: A Biographical Encyclopedia] (in Hungarian). Helikon Kiadó. ISBN 963-547-085-1.
- Pop, Ioan-Aurel (2005). "Transylvania in the 14th century and the first half of the 15th century (1300-1456)". In Pop, Ioan-Aurel; Nägler, Thomas (eds.). The History of Transylvania, Vol. I. (Until 1541). Romanian Cultural Institute (Center for Transylvanian Studies). pp. 247–298. ISBN 973-7784-00-6.
- Szőcs, Tibor (2014). A nádori intézmény korai története, 1000–1342 [An Early History of the Palatinal Institution: 1000–1342] (in Hungarian). Magyar Tudományos Akadémia Támogatott Kutatások Irodája. ISBN 978-963-508-697-9.
- Zsoldos, Attila (2011a). Magyarország világi archontológiája, 1000–1301 [Secular Archontology of Hungary, 1000–1301] (in Hungarian). História, MTA Történettudományi Intézete. ISBN 978-963-9627-38-3.
- Zsoldos, Attila (2011b). "Debrecen mint igazgatási központ a 14. század elején [Debrecen as an Administrative Centre at the Beginning of the 14th Century]". In Bárány, Attila; Papp, Klára; Szálkai, Tamás (eds.). Debrecen város 650 éves. Várostörténeti tanulmányok (in Hungarian). Debreceni Egyetem. Történelmi Intézet. pp. 49–66. ISBN 978-963-821-6465.
- Zsoldos, Attila (2016). "Erdélyi háborúk a 14. század elején [Transylvanian Wars at the Beginning of the 14th Century]". In Pósán, László; Veszprémy, László (eds.). Elfeledett háborúk. Középkori csaták és várostromok (6–16. század) (in Hungarian). Zrínyi Kiadó. pp. 198–231. ISBN 978-963-3276-96-9.

Dózsa I House of Debreceni Born: ? Died: 1322 or 1323
Political offices
Preceded by Nicholas Meggyesi	Voivode of Transylvania; 1318–1321	Succeeded by Thomas Szécsényi
Preceded by Dominic Rátót	Palatine of Hungary; 1322	Succeeded by Philip Drugeth
