= Pok (genus) =

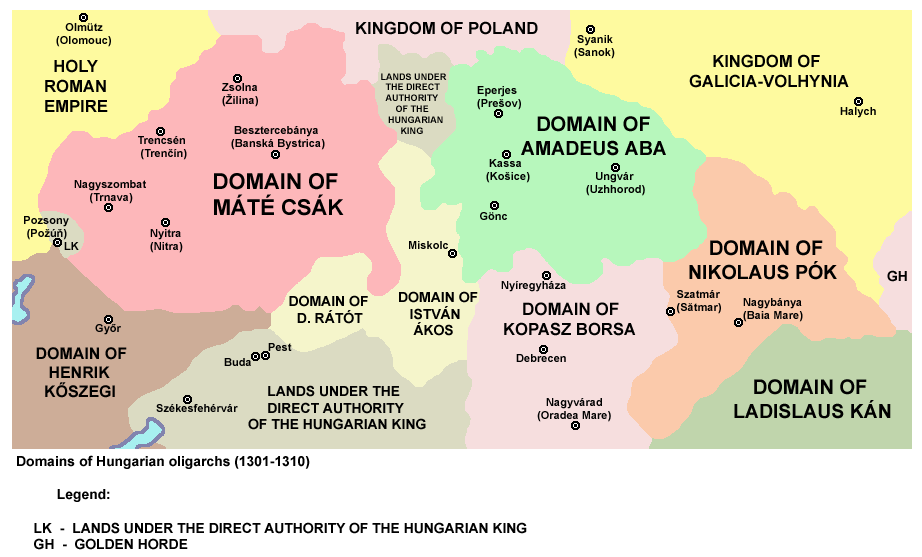
Domain of Nicholas Pok in Northeastern Hungary

Pok, Pók or Puk is the name of a Hungarian kindred (Clan Pok) in the Kingdom of Hungary. The first known ancestor of the family was mentioned in 1220 called Mór. Mór participated in the Battle of Mohi. 88 domains are known as Clan Pok possessions in the Kingdom of Hungary. The Puky, Mórocz and Meggyesi families belong to this genus. The clan might be of Pecheneg origin, as the name of the genus has been etymologized to "dung" or "rubbish" according to Vámbéry. Similarly, a sub-clan of Turkmens is called "Pokli". Otherwise it may be related to Persian pāk "pure" through Turkic mediation.

== Notable members of the clan ==
- Maurice I, Master of the stewards
- Maurice II, Master of the treasury
- Amadeus, Bishop of Győr
- Nicholas, Voivode of Transylvania, oligarch
