= Árpás =

- Flag Coat of arms

- Location of Árpás
- Coordinates: 47.51331°N 17.39151°E
- Country: Hungary
- County: Győr-Moson-Sopron
- District: Tét

Area
  - Total: 14.27 km^{2} (5.51 sq mi)

Population (2017)
  - Total: 261
  - Density: 18.3/km^{2} (47.4/sq mi)
- Time zone: UTC+1 (CET)
  - Summer (DST): UTC+2 (CEST)
- Postal code: 9132
- Area code: 96
- Website: http://www.arpas.hu/

Árpás is a village in Győr-Moson-Sopron County, Hungary, on the Little Hungarian Plain.

== Etymology ==
Árpás means barley in Hungarian, a traditional product of the farms in the area; although today much more vegetables are grown, particularly cucumbers and tomatoes.

== Geography, history and landmarks ==
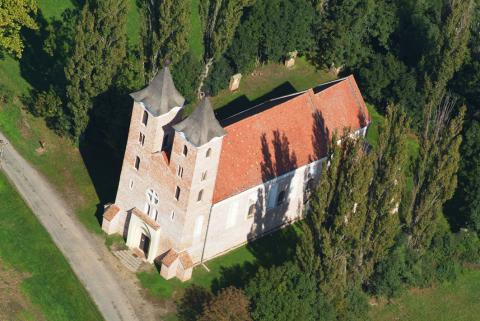
Aerial view of the Árpás church.

Árpás village is situated in the north-western part of Hungary, beside the river Rába, about 30 km from Győr. The bridge of Árpás is an important crossing point on the Rába. The village is built on a bench of the river with hills to the west. It is protected by a levee from the floods. Around the village there are backwater lakes, forests and fields. The municipality of Árpás consists of the village proper, the river section outside the levee, and the surrounding farms, on both sides of the Rába, with some as much as 5 km. away from the village centre.

The village is known for its Premonstratensian church (provostry) named Saint James. The provostry was founded in 1251 by Maurice II Pok. In 1300 Árpás was the property of Count Lőrinc Cseszneky. The convent was inhabited by Premonstratensian nuns from 1526 until 1577. And again, after the Turkish wars, Poor Clares from Nagyszombat resettled the convent. They rebuilt the church on the existing foundations with baroque style elements, finishing it in 1751. Later this church became the parish church of the village.

The church is a beautiful example of the brick architecture from the Árpád age. One nave is built and closed with a simple apse, with two towers on the western side of the church, as it is the case in many churches in Hungary. From the original construction it has a Romanesque western doorway with tympanon. The painting behind the main altar showed a Madonna with mantle, a rather popular iconographical topic painted around 1660.

In the early 19th century a lot of people emigrated overseas from Árpás.
