= Šimonovce =

Šimonovce Rimasimonyi
- Municipality
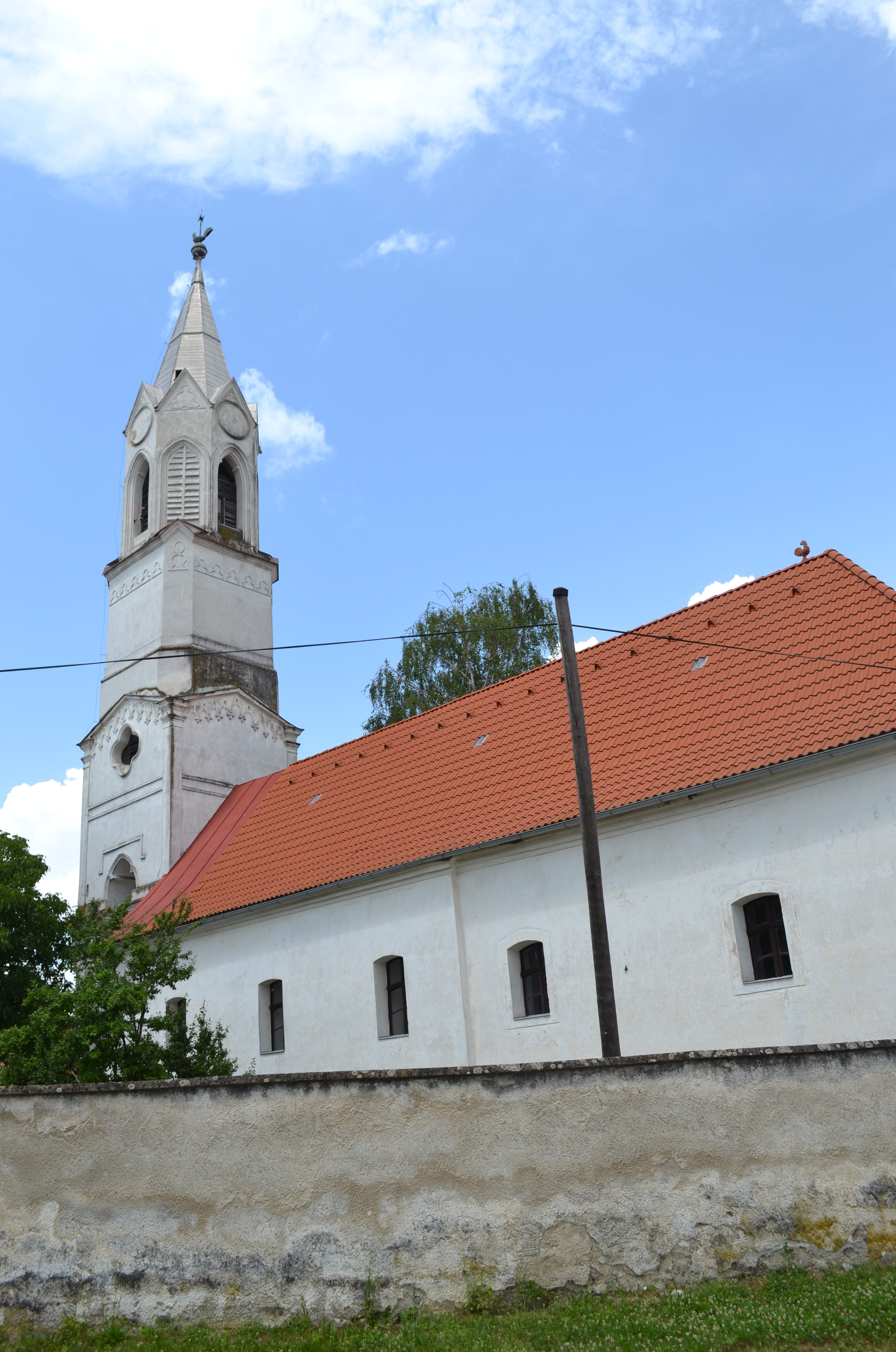

- Flag

- Location of Šimonovce in the Banská Bystrica Region Location of Šimonovce in Slovakia
- Coordinates: 48.27°N 20.12°E
- Country: Slovakia
- Region: Banská Bystrica Region
- District: Rimavská Sobota District
- First mentioned: 1221

Area
  - Total: 7.82 km^{2} (3.02 sq mi)
- Elevation: 179 m (587 ft)

Population (2025)
  - Total: 509
- Time zone: UTC+1 (CET)
  - Summer (DST): UTC+2 (CEST)
- Postal code: 980 03
- Area code: +421 47
- Vehicle registration plate (until 2022): RS
- Website: www.obecsimonovce.sk

Šimonovce (Hungarian: Rimasimonyi) is a village and municipality in the Rimavská Sobota District of the Banská Bystrica Region of southern Slovakia.

== Geography ==
The municipality lies at an altitude of 179 metres (587 ft) and covers an area of 7.82 km^{2} (3.02 sq mi) (2025).

== Population ==
Population statistic (10 years)
| Year | 1995 | 2005 | 2015 | 2025 |
|---|---|---|---|---|
| Count | 444 | 498 | 570 | 509 |
| Difference | | +12.16% | +14.45% | −10.70% |

Population statistic
| Year | 2024 | 2025 |
|---|---|---|
| Count | 512 | 509 |
| Difference | | −0.58% |

It has a population of 509 people (31 December 2025).

=== Ethnicity ===
Census 2021 (1+ %)
| Ethnicity | Number | Fraction |
|---|---|---|
| Hungarian | 443 | 81.13% |
| Romani | 131 | 23.99% |
| Slovak | 75 | 13.73% |
| Not found out | 28 | 5.12% |
| Total | 546 | |

In year 2021 was 546 people by ethnicity 443 as Hungarian, 131 as Romani, 75 as Slovak, 28 as Not found out, 2 as Czech and 1 as French.

Note on population: The difference values of population numbers in the table "Population statistic" and in the sections "Ethnicity" & "Religion" is caused by the use of various statistical methods.

=== Religion ===
Census 2021 (1+ %)
| Religion | Number | Fraction |
|---|---|---|
| Roman Catholic Church | 357 | 65.38% |
| Calvinist Church | 96 | 17.58% |
| None | 69 | 12.64% |
| Not found out | 11 | 2.01% |
| Total | 546 | |

In year 2021 was 546 people by religion 357 from Roman Catholic Church, 96 from Calvinist Church, 69 from None, 11 from Not found out, 5 from Greek Catholic Church, 4 from Evangelical Church, 2 from Old Catholic Church, 1 from Other and not ascertained christian church and 1 from Christian Congregations in Slovakia.
