= Bakonypéterd =

- Flag Coat of arms

- Location of Győr-Moson-Sopron county in Hungary

- Location of Bakonypéterd
- Coordinates: 47.46611°N 17.79552°E
- Country: Hungary
- County: Győr-Moson-Sopron

Area
  - Total: 10.02 km^{2} (3.87 sq mi)

Population (2004)
  - Total: 299
  - Density: 29.84/km^{2} (77.3/sq mi)
- Time zone: UTC+1 (CET)
  - Summer (DST): UTC+2 (CEST)
- Postal code: 9088
- Area code: 88

Bakonypéterd is a village in Győr-Moson-Sopron county, Hungary. It had previously been part of Veszprém county until 1999. Highway 82 which runs through Bakonypéterd connects the village to Ravazd.

The village has a cemetery built in the 1800s with gravestones that are being restored by local residents.
