= Mórichida =

Place in Győr-Moson-Sopron, Hungary

Mórichida Mursella (in Latin)
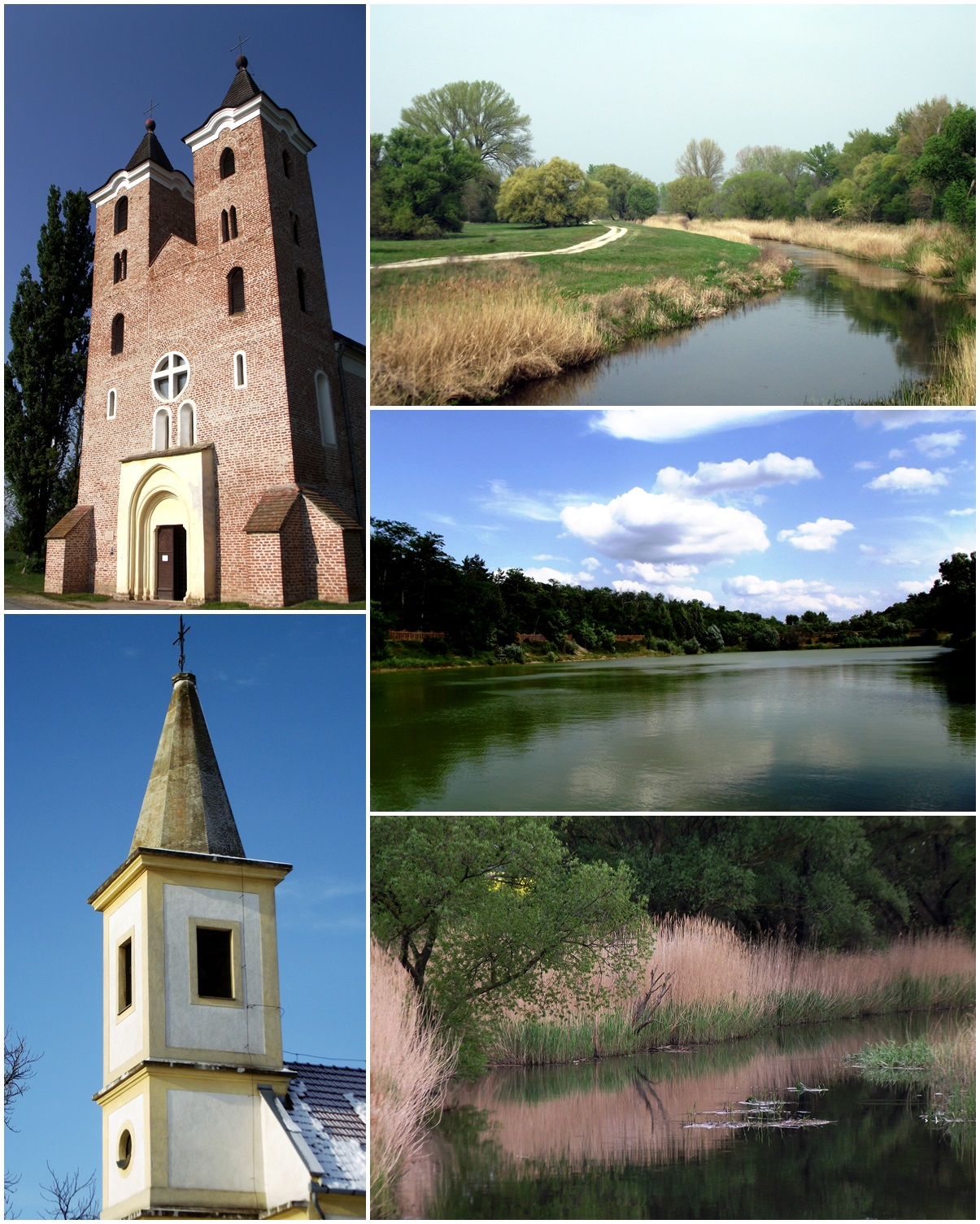
- St. James Church, Lutheran church, Marcal river bank, Kaszalapi Lake, Marcal River

- Flag Coat of arms

- Location of Győr-Moson-Sopron county in Hungary

- Location of Mórichida
- Coordinates: 47.51246°N 17.42147°E
- Country: Hungary
- County: Győr-Moson-Sopron
- Named for: Maurice I Pok

Area
  - Total: 32.31 km^{2} (12.47 sq mi)

Population (2013)
  - Total: 818
  - Density: 2,591/km^{2} (6,710/sq mi)
- Time zone: UTC+1 (CET)
  - Summer (DST): UTC+2 (CEST)
- Postal code: 9131
- Area code: 96

Mórichida is a village in Győr-Moson-Sopron county, Hungary. Situated in the Marcal valley, the Raba river is on the western edge of the village.

== Sights ==
- St. Jacob church (1251)
- Lutheran church (1789)
- Vineyards (1814)
- Nature: Rába, Marcal, Kaszalapi Lake
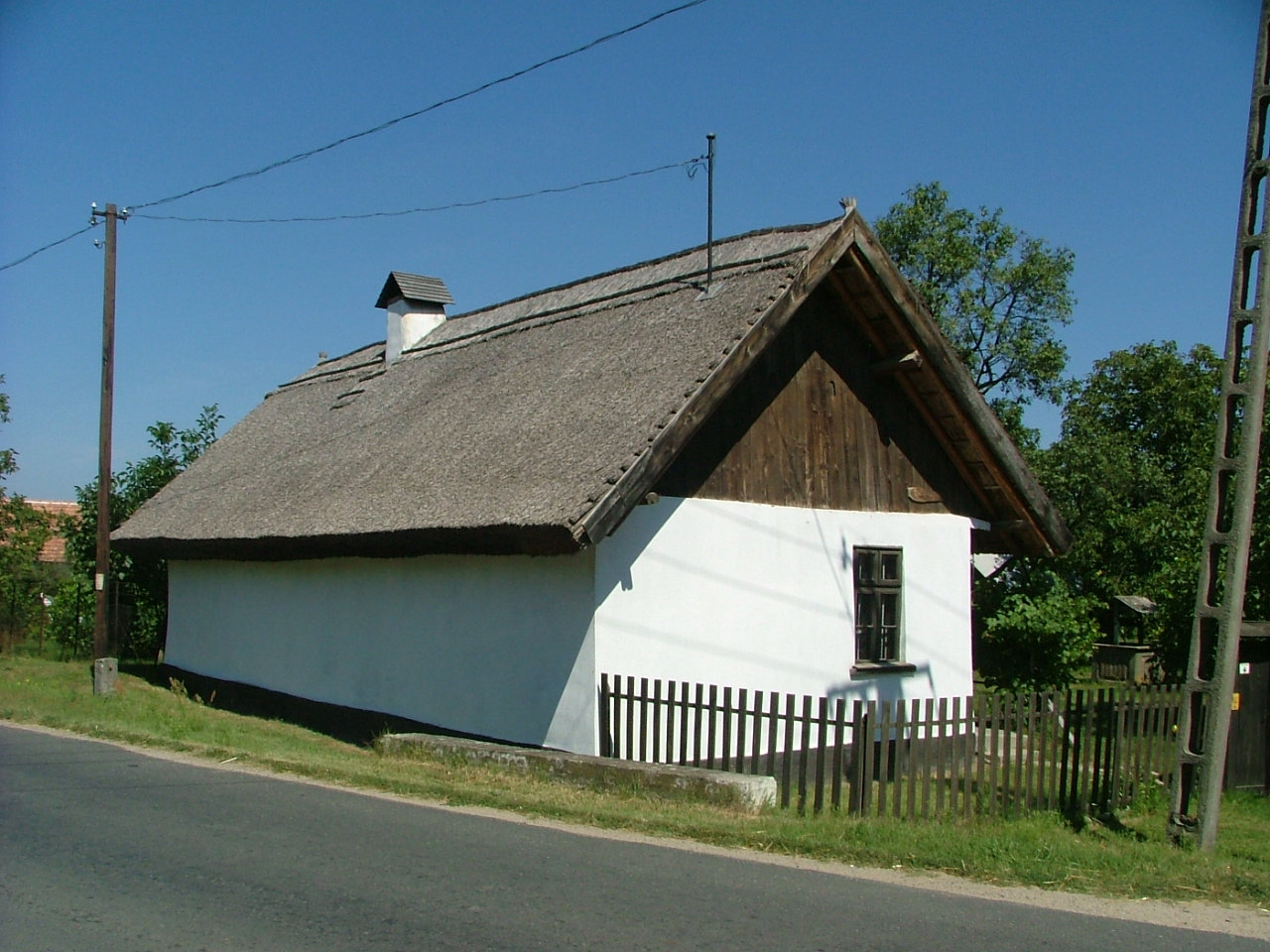
Old house

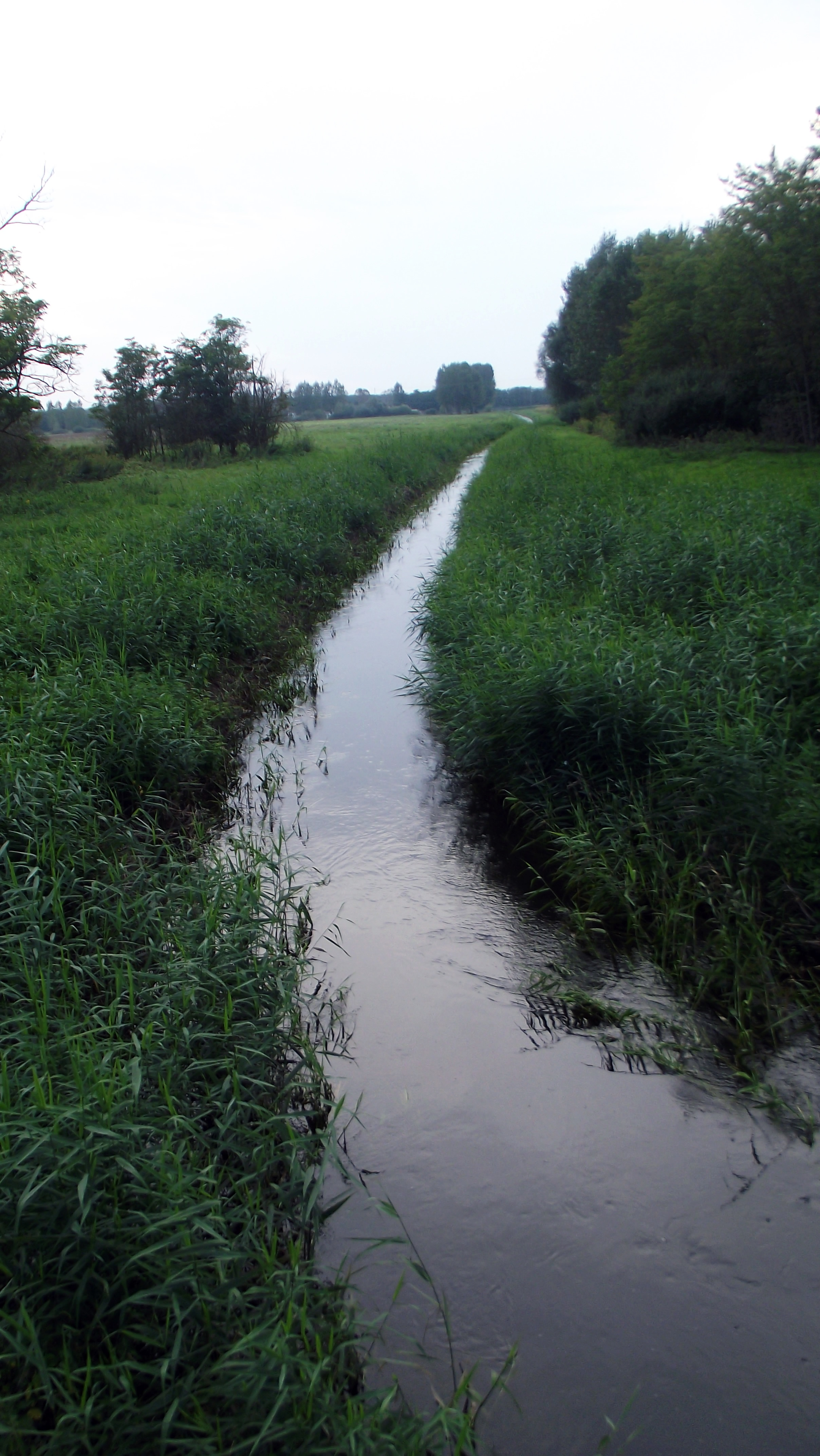
Csángota

== Born in Mórichida ==
- Fehér Dániel (Nagymórichida–Tekepuszta, 1890. – Sopron, 1955.) - Forest engineer, microbiologist, plant physiologist, botanist.
