= Hegymagas =

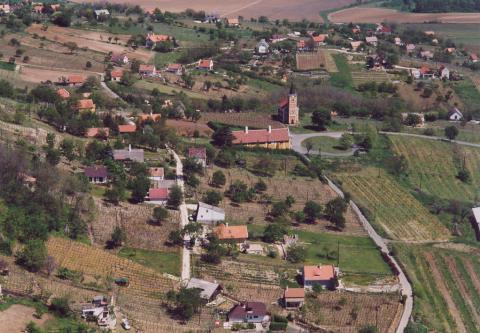
- Aerial photography of St. George Hill, part of the outer Hegymagas village area.

- Flag Coat of arms

- Location of Veszprém County in Hungary

- Location of Hegymagas
- Coordinates: 46°50′01″N 17°26′00″E
- Country: Hungary
- County: Veszprém

Government
  - Mayor: Gyurka Miklósné (Ind.)

Area
  - Total: 7.89 km^{2} (3.05 sq mi)

Population (2022)
  - Total: 281
  - Density: 35.6/km^{2} (92.2/sq mi)
- Time zone: UTC+1 (CET)
  - Summer (DST): UTC+2 (CEST)
- Postal code: 8265
- Area code: 87
- Website: www.hegymagas.hu

Hegymagas is a village in Veszprém County, Hungary.
