= Szigliget =

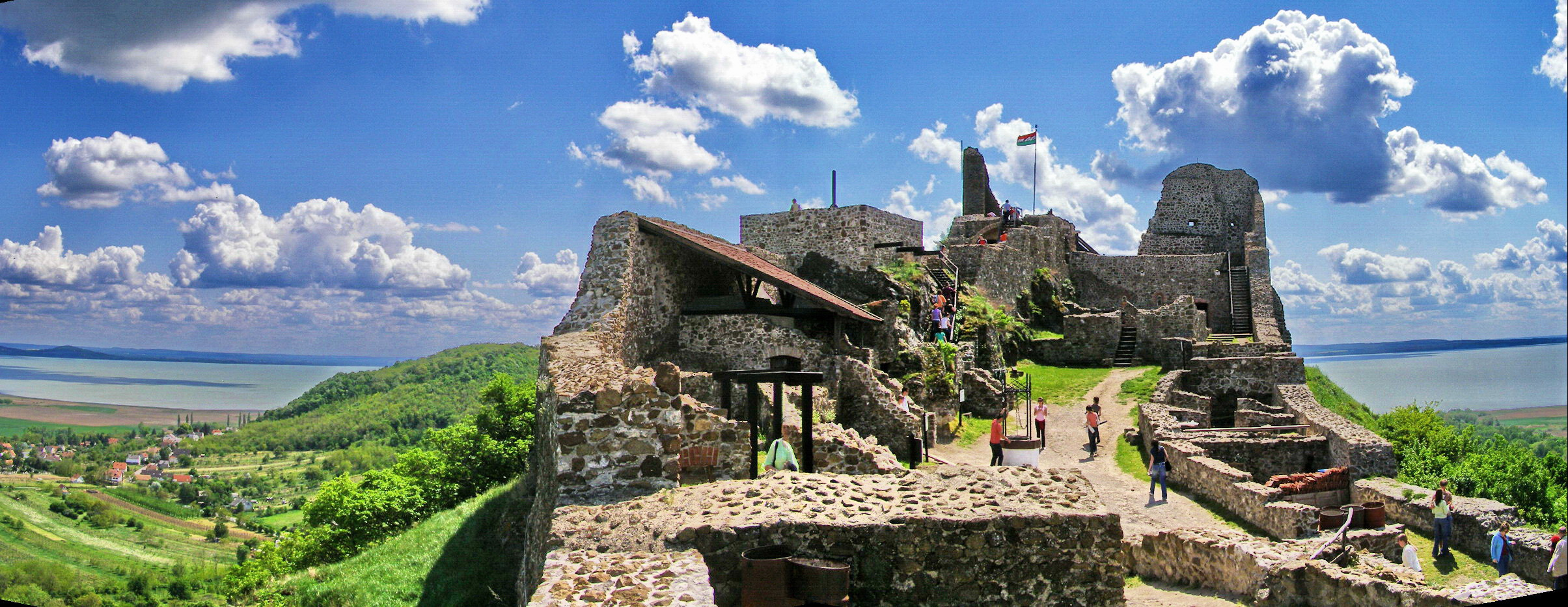
- The fortress of Szigliget

- Flag Coat of arms

- Location of Szigliget
- Coordinates: 46.79610°N 17.43829°E
- Country: Hungary
- County: Veszprém

Area
  - Total: 34.26 km^{2} (13.23 sq mi)

Population (2017)
  - Total: 805
  - Density: 23.5/km^{2} (60.9/sq mi)
- Time zone: UTC+1 (CET)
  - Summer (DST): UTC+2 (CEST)
- Postal code: 8264
- Area code: 87
- Website: https://szigliget.hu/

Szigliget is a village in Veszprém county, Hungary.

== Settings ==
The village can be found on the northern bank of Lake Balaton in the vicinity of Badacsony and Keszthely. The village was built between and on volcanic hills. It can be reached by car on the 71 highway or by train on the Székesfehérvár–Tapolca-railway stopping at Badacsonytördemic-Szigliget station.

== History ==
The settlement existed in the Neolithic and Bronze Ages. Celtic, Roman and Avar archaeological finds were discovered in the vicinity. The ruins of a parochial church, built in the 12th century, can be seen. Until 1822 the area was an island in Lake Balaton. The island was connected to the mainland in 1822 by rearrangement of the bank-dams around Balaton.

== Sightseeings ==
=== Avas church ruins ===
The church was built in the Árpád era (12th century), of basalt. The old tower is still standing.

=== Castle Szigliget ===
The ruins of the medieval fortress stand atop the 239m Várhegy hill. It was built by Favus of Pannonhalma between 1260 and 1262. Recently restored, the castle looks out on a panorama of Lake Balaton toward the Tapolca Basin. Poets have praised the beauty of the village and landscape.

=== The manor of Count Esterházy ===
The manor house, built in the 19th century by the House of Esterházy, is a modern home for artists, surrounded by the arboretum of 9,2 hectares.

== Gallery ==
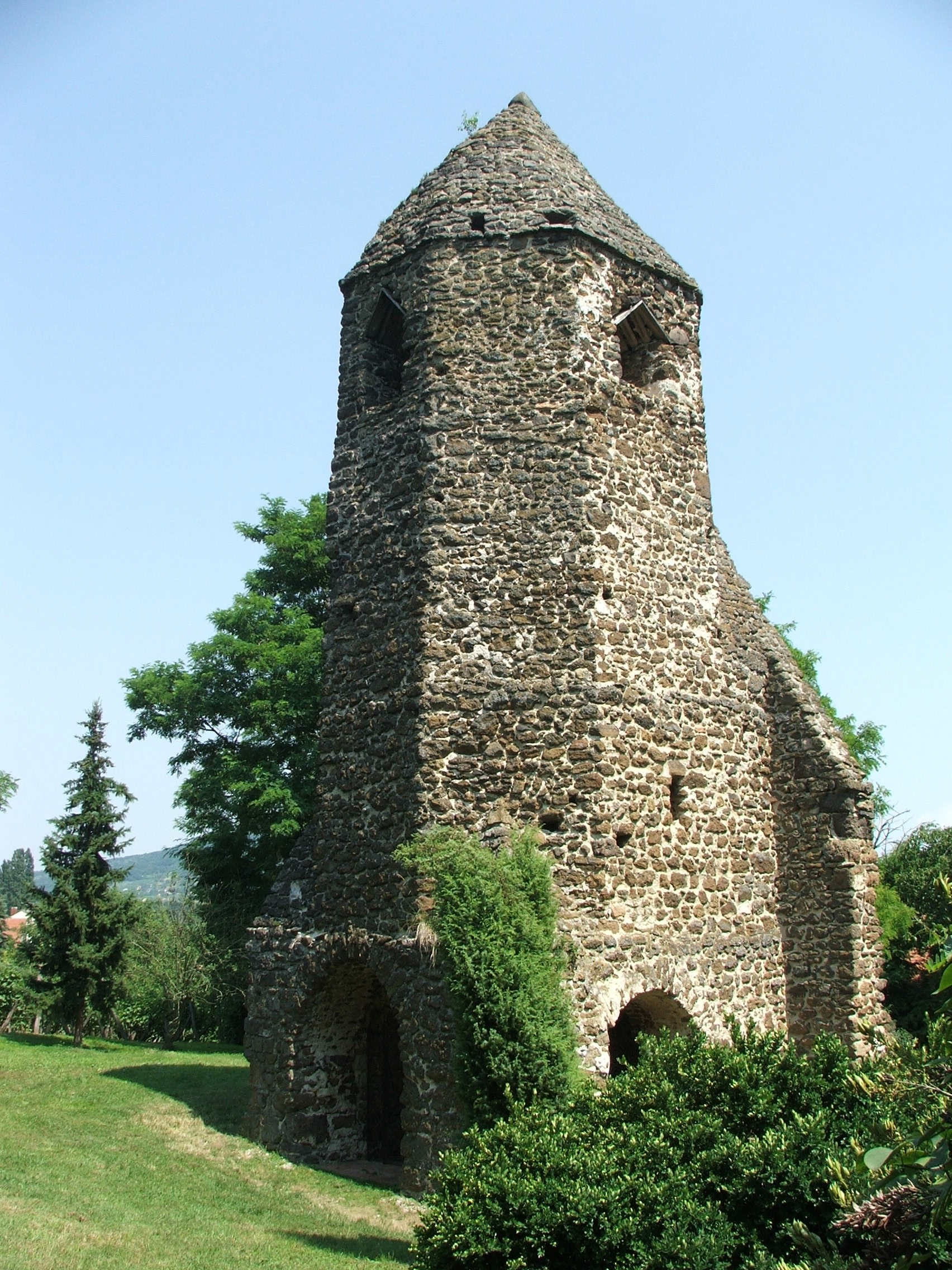
Avasi-church ruins

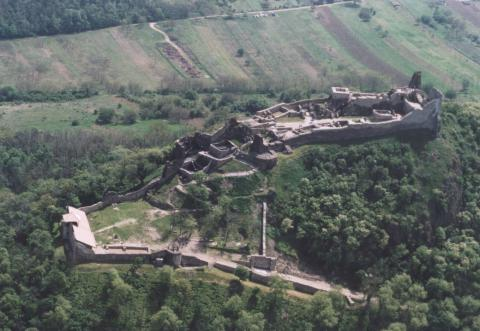
Fortress from above

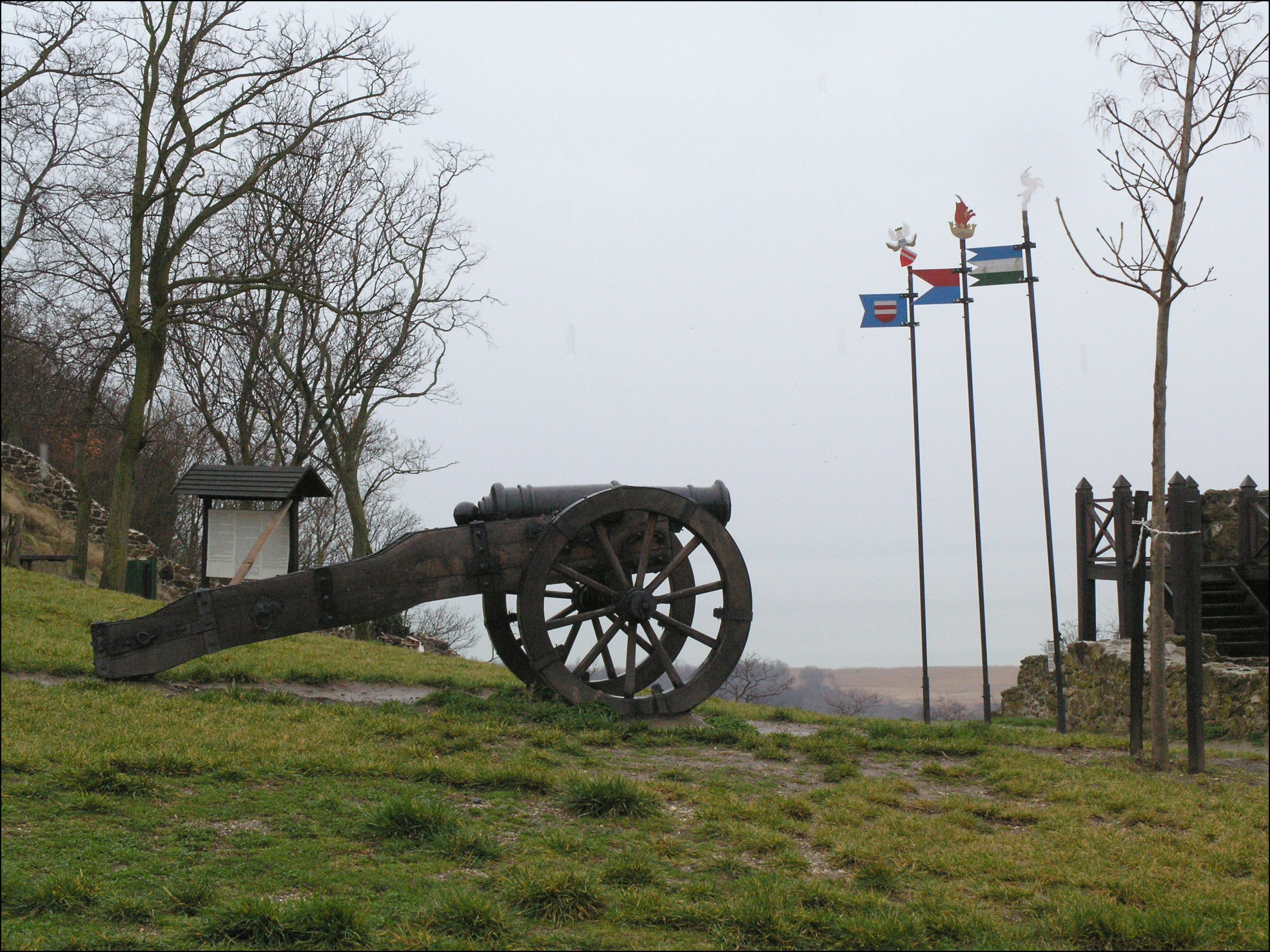
Fortress

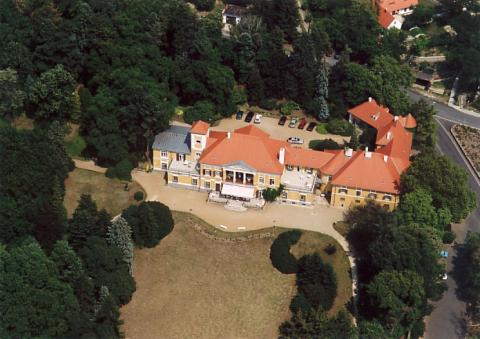
Eszterházy-manor house
