= Diocese of Győr =

Latin Catholic diocese in Hungary

Coordinates: 47.6891°N 17.6313°E

Diocese of Győr Dioecesis Iaurinensis Győri Egyházmegye

Catholic
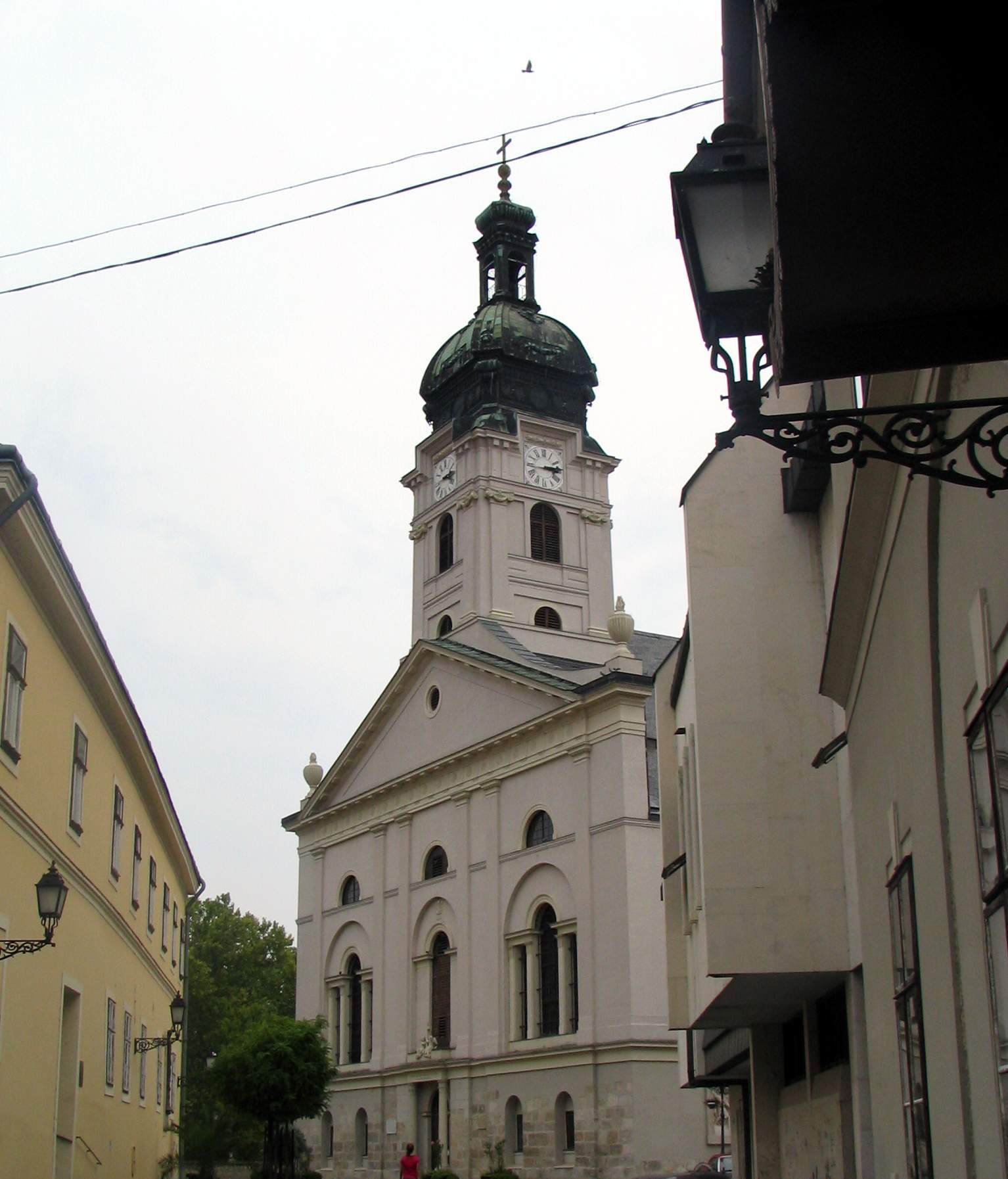
- The Cathedral of St Mary

Location
- Country: Hungary
- Ecclesiastical province: Esztergom-Budapest
- Metropolitan: Esztergom-Budapest

Statistics
- Area: 5,100 km^{2} (2,000 sq mi)
- Population: Total; Catholics: (as of 2013); 552,453; 378,099 (68.4%)

Information
- Denomination: Catholic Church
- Sui iuris church: Latin Church
- Rite: Roman Rite
- Established: 11th century
- Cathedral: Cathedral Basilica of St Mary in Győr

Current leadership
- Pope: Leo XIV
- Bishop: András Veres
- Metropolitan Archbishop: Péter Erdő

Map
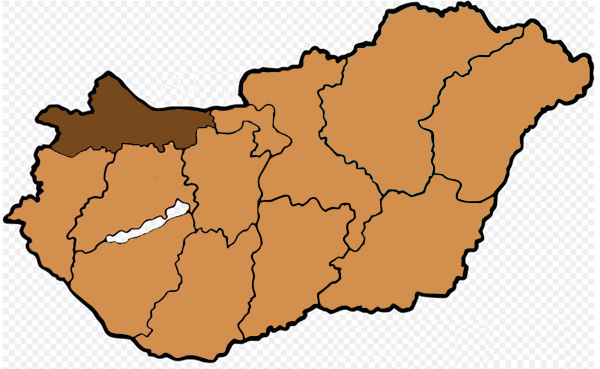
- Map of the Diocese

Website
- Website of the Diocese

The Diocese of Győr (Hungarian: Győri Egyházmegye, German: Bistum Raab, Latin: Dioecesis Iaurinensis) is a diocese of the Latin Church of the Catholic Church in Hungary. The diocese is suffragan to the Archdiocese of Esztergom-Budapest. The diocese is believed to have been established in 1009 by King Stephen I of Hungary, along with most of the other Hungarian dioceses.

The Cathedral Basilica of Győr is dedicated to Blessed Virgin Mary. The current bishop is Lajos Pápai, who was appointed in 1991.

== Secular offices connected to the bishopric ==
The Bishops of Győr were Perpetual Counts of Baranya (Hungarian: Győr vármegye örökös főispánja, Latin: Jaurinensis perpetuus supremus comes) from the 16th century till 1783.

== List of the Bishops of Győr ==
- Nicholas I (c. 1051 – c. 1055)
- Hartvik (end of 11th – beginning of 12th century)
- George (1111–1118)
- Ambrose (1124–1125/1131)
- Peter I (1134–1135)
- Paul (1137–1138)
- Zacheus (1142–1146)
- Izbeg (1150 – c. 1156)
- Gervasius (1156–1157)
- Andrew I (1169–1176)
- Mikod (1176 – c. 1186)
- Ugrin Csák (c. 1188–1204)
- Peter II (1205–1218)
- Cosmas (1219–1222)
- Gregory (1224–1241)
- Benedict Osl (1243–1244)
- Artolf (1245–1252)
- Amadeus Pok (1254–1267)
- Farkas Bejc (1268–1269)
- Denis (1270–1285)
- Andrew II (1291–1294)
- Theodore Tengerdi (1295–1308)
- Nicholas II Kőszegi (1308–1336)
- Coloman of Hungary (1337–1375)
- John I of Surdis (1375–1376)
- Peter Siklósi (1376–1377)
- William (1378–1386)
- Thomas (1386)
- John II Hédervári (1386–1415)
- František Ujlaky (1540–1554)
- Leopold Karl, Graf von Kollonitsch (1686–1690)
- Christian August von Sachsen-Zeitz (1696–1725)
- Philipp Ludwig von Sinzendorf (5 May 1725 appointed – 10 July 1732 appointed, Bishop of Wrocław)
- Jozef Ignác de Vilt (Wilt) (26 August 1806 appointed – 5 October 1813 died)
- Ernst Fürst zu Schwarzenberg (1818 † 1821)
- János Simor (19 March 1857 appointed – 22 February 1867 appointed, Archbishop of Esztergom)
- Giovanni Zalka (27 March 1867 appointed – 1901 died)
- Miklós Széchenyi de Salvar-Felsovidék (16 December 1901 appointed – 20 April 1911 appointed, Bishop of Oradea Mare {Gran Varadino, Nagyvárad})
- Árpád Lipót Várady (22 April 1911 appointed – 25 May 1914 appointed, Archbishop of Kalocsa)
- Antal Fetser (22 January 1915 appointed – 6 October 1933 died)
- Stefano Breyer (13 December 1933 appointed – 28 September 1940 died)
- Bl. Vilmos Apor (21 January 1941 appointed – 2 April 1945 died)
- János Scheffler (8 November 1945 Appointed, however he was not installed because he preferred to stay in his Diocese of Szatmár )
- Karl Kalman Papp (3 May 1946 appointed – 28 July 1966 died)
- Kornél Pataky (Pataki) (2 April 1976 appointed – 18 March 1991 resigned)
- Lajos Pápai (18 March 1991 appointed - 17 May 2016 retired)
- András Veres (17 May 2016 appointed - )

== Sources ==
- Korai Magyar Történeti Lexikon (9-14. század), főszerkesztő: Kristó, Gyula, szerkesztők: Engel, Pál és Makk, Ferenc (Akadémiai Kiadó, Budapest, 1994)
- Fallenbüchl, Zoltán: Magyarország főispánjai 1526-1848 (Argumentum, Budapest, 1994)
- Magyarország Történeti Kronológiája I-III. – A kezdetektől 1526-ig; 1526-1848, 1848-1944, főszerkesztő: Benda, Kálmán (Akadémiai Kiadó, Budapest, 1981, 1982, 1993)
- Magyar Történelmi Fogalomtár I-II. – A-K; L-ZS, főszerkesztő: Bán, Péter (Gondolat, Budapest, 1989)
- Fallenbüchl, Zoltán: Magyarország főméltóságai (Maecenas, 1988)
