= Ladislaus Rátót =

Ladislaus (I) Rátót

Ban of Slavonia
- Reign: 1300
- Predecessor: Stephen Babonić
- Successor: Henry Kőszegi
- Died: April 1328
- Noble family: gens Rátót
- Spouse: N Kacsics
- Issue: Oliver II; Stephen Tari; Anka
- Father: Stephen I
- Mother: first wife of his father

Ladislaus (I) from the kindred Rátót (Hungarian: Rátót nembeli (I.) László; died April 1328) was a Hungarian nobleman and landowner at the turn of the 13th and 14th centuries, who served as Ban of Slavonia in 1300. Initially, he was a member of the court of pretender Wenceslaus during the era of Interregnum. Alongside his kinship, he joined Charles I later. He became disgraced in the last decade of his life. He was the ancestor of the Tari family.

== Family ==
Ladislaus (also Lack) was born into the prestigious and influential gens (clan) Rátót, as the son of Stephen I ("the Porc"), who was a strong confidant of Queen Elizabeth the Cuman and held several offices in her court since 1265. It is plausible that Stephen's only known wife Aglent Smaragd was not the mother of Ladislaus; she was still alive in 1327, and was a Beguine nun at the Sibylla cloister in Buda. Her brothers, Ladislaus and Aynard were active courtiers even in 1350. Ladislaus had four known brothers: the eldest one, Dominic II was considered actual head of the family and a powerful baron for decades. Lawrence was killed in the Battle of Lake Hód (near present-day Hódmezővásárhely) in 1282. Kakas perished in the Battle of Rozgony in 1312. The youngest brother was Leustach III (also "the Great"). He was first mentioned by contemporary records only in 1338, thus he was presumably much younger than his late brothers, and his mother was perhaps Aglent Smaragd.

Ladislaus engaged an unidentified daughter of Nicholas Kacsics from the Zagyvafői branch in 1290. They had three children; Oliver II, Stephen Tari (the first member of the Tari noble family) and Anka (Anne), who married a certain Thepsen of Posega. Ladislaus' great-grandson was Lawrence Tari, the famous knight and pilgrim in the age of Sigismund. The Tari family became extinct in 1472.

== Career ==
Ladislaus was first mentioned by a non-authentic charter in 1283, which narrates a lawsuit and a subsequent agreement within the kindred following the division of their estates. Seven years later, in 1290, he countersigned that document too, which concluded a peace between the Rátót and Kacsics clans in Nógrád County after series of clashes and dominations, which resulted Leustach Kacsics' brutal murder and the devastation of his forts. In accordance with the treaty, Ladislaus Rátót engaged the late Leustach's sister.

Alongside his brother Dominic, Ladislaus was considered a loyal supporter of King Andrew III from his coronation in 1290. Ladislaus and his kinship attended the assembly of the prelates, noblemen, Saxons, Székelys, and Cumans in Pest in the summer of 1298. He was made Master of the stewards around February 1291, and held the dignity at least until July 1294. As there is no known office-holders in the upcoming decades, it is presumable that Ladislaus served in this capacity until 1300, when he was appointed Ban of Slavonia. He perhaps held the office until the death of Andrew III and the extinction of the Árpád dynasty in January 1301. As the suzerainty over the territory of Slavonia were divided between the Kőszegis and Babonići, who ruled their oligarchic provinces independently of the royal power by the last years of the 13th century, Ladislaus had no effective control over Slavonia, and virtually served in this capacity in the royal court only, while he bore the title. Following another division of estates within the kindred sometimes in the late 13th century or early 14th century, Ladislaus and his branch became the sole owners of Ágasvár (lit. "Ágas Castle"), a small fort located in the mountain range of Mátra, which had formerly functioned as the kindred's residence.

After Andrew's death, Ladislaus supported the claim of Wenceslaus in the emerging war of succession for the Hungarian throne. He was a member of that Hungarian delegation, which traveled to Bohemia and offered the crown to the young prince. His father, the Bohemian king Wenceslaus II met the Hungarian envoys in Hodonín in early August 1301 and accepted their offer in his son's name. Ladislaus was referred to as treasurer of the queenly court in October 1302 (albeit Wenceslaus had only fiancée, Elizabeth of Töss, who lived in Austria during that time). By 1307, Ladislaus took an oath of allegiance to Charles of Anjou, alongside his brothers and cousins. He attended the Diet of Rákos on 10 October 1307, which confirmed Charles' claim to the throne. Alongside his brothers, Dominic and Kakas, he was present at the national assembly on 27 November 1308 in Pest, where Charles was unanimously proclaimed king. His person was represented by Dominic at the second coronation of Charles I on 15 June 1309.

Following the death of his elder brother, Dominic in the second half of 1320, Ladislaus remained the last member of his generation in the Rátót clan, not including his younger brother Leustach III. He gradually lost influence in the royal court since Charles' unification war, where skilled soldiers and military leaders emerged. In the early 1320s, Ladislaus was embroiled in conflict with one of them, Mikcs Ákos, Ban of Slavonia, who successfully fought against the oligarchs and Charles' other enemies. Because of their confrontation, Ladislaus, who represented the old elite against the king's "new aristocracy", became disgraced at the royal court. Thereafter Ladislaus was imprisoned and sentenced to death. He ransomed his liberty with the bequeathing of Váchartyán, Kisnémedi (both in Pest County) and Selid in Nógrád County to Mikcs Ákos in 1325. Simultaneously, he compensated his son-in-law Thepsen, who would have inherited a part of Váchartyán, with a portion in Vácrátót. Ladislaus retired from public life thereafter. He compiled his last will and testament in April 1328. He died soon.

== Sources ==
- Engel, Pál (1996). Magyarország világi archontológiája, 1301–1457, I [Secular Archontology of Hungary, 1301–1457, Volume I] (in Hungarian). História, MTA Történettudományi Intézete. ISBN 963-8312-44-0.
- Kádár, Tamás (2014). "Egy hűséges báró a XIII–XIV. század fordulóján. Rátót nembeli "Porc" István fia Domonkos nádor [A Loyal Baron at the Turn of 13th and 14th Centuries: Palatine Dominic, son of Stephen the "Porc" from the Kindred Rátót]". Fons (in Hungarian). 21 (3). Szentpétery Imre Történettudományi Alapítvány: 267–288. ISSN 1217-8020.
- Kristó, Gyula (1999). "I. Károly király főúri elitje (1301–1309) [The Aristocratic Elite of King Charles I, 1301–1309]". Századok (in Hungarian). 133 (1). Magyar Történelmi Társulat: 41–62. ISSN 0039-8098.
- Markó, László (2006). A magyar állam főméltóságai Szent Istvántól napjainkig: Életrajzi Lexikon [Great Officers of State in Hungary from King Saint Stephen to Our Days: A Biographical Encyclopedia] (in Hungarian). Helikon Kiadó. ISBN 963-208-970-7.
- Zsoldos, Attila (2011). Magyarország világi archontológiája, 1000–1301 [Secular Archontology of Hungary, 1000–1301] (in Hungarian). História, MTA Történettudományi Intézete. ISBN 978-963-9627-38-3.

Ladislaus I Genus Rátót Born: ? Died: April 1328
Political offices
Preceded by Peter Csák (?)	Master of the stewards 1291–1294	Succeeded by Paul Szécsi (1318)
Preceded by Stephen Babonić	Ban of Slavonia; 1300	Succeeded by Henry Kőszegi
