= Kakas Rátót =

Master of the horse
- Reign: 1303
- Predecessor: John Csák (?)
- Successor: John Aba (?)
- Died: 15 June 1312; Battle of Rozgony
- Noble family: gens Rátót
- Spouse: N Visontai
- Issue: John Kakas de Kaza
- Father: Stephen I
- Mother: first wife of his father

Kakas from the kindred Rátót (Hungarian: Rátót nembeli Kakas; killed 15 June 1312) was a Hungarian nobleman and soldier at the turn of the 13th and 14th centuries, who served as Master of the horse in the court of pretender Wenceslaus during the era of Interregnum. Alongside his kinship, he joined Charles I later. He perished in Battle of Rozgony. He was the forefather of the Kakas de Kaza noble family.

== Family ==
Kakas (also Kokas or Kokos) was born into the prestigious and influential gens (clan) Rátót, as the son of Stephen I ("the Porc"), who was a strong confidant of Queen Elizabeth the Cuman and held several offices in her court since 1265. It is plausible that Stephen's only known wife Aglent Smaragd was not the mother of Kakas; she was still alive in 1327, and was a Beguine nun at the Sibylla cloister in Buda. Her brothers, Ladislaus and Aynard were active courtiers even in 1350. Kakas had four known brothers: the eldest one, Dominic II was considered actual head of the family and a powerful baron for decades. Lawrence was killed in the Battle of Lake Hód (near present-day Hódmezővásárhely) in 1282. Ladislaus was Ban of Slavonia in 1300 and ancestor of the Tari family. The youngest brother was Leustach III (also "the Great"). He was first mentioned by contemporary records only in 1338, thus he was presumably much younger than his late brothers, and his mother was perhaps Aglent Smaragd.

Kakas married one of the unidentified daughters of Paul Visontai, who originated from the Kompolt branch of the gens (clan) Aba. They had a son John, who became the first member of the Kakas de Kaza noble family, which resided in Sajókaza. The family died out in 1488, while its cadet branch, the Gyulafi de Kaza family became extinct between 1522 and 1524.

== Career ==
During the reign of Andrew III of Hungary in the last decade of the 13th century, Kakas followed his elder brother Dominic's political orientation. As a staunch supporter of the king, he was made ispán of Bodrog and Tolna counties by February 1300. Kakas possessed landholdings in Gömör and Borsod counties. He resided in Sőreg (present-day Šurice in Slovakia), where he built a fortified castle at the top of the so-called "Owl Castle" (Slovak: Soví hrad, Hungarian: Bagolyvár). The fort was demolished by the end of the 14th century.

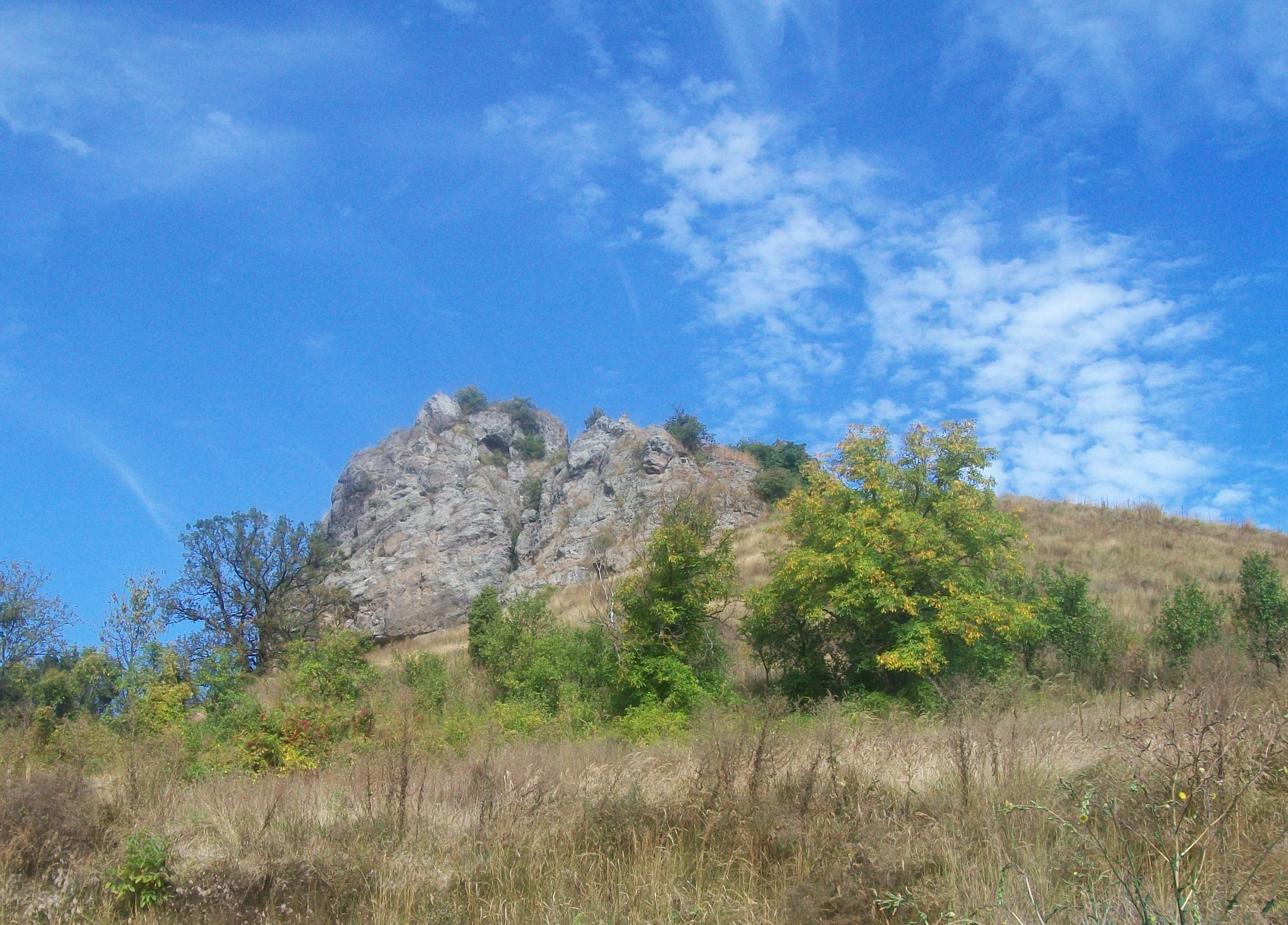
The "Owl Castle" in Šurice (Sőreg), where Kakas Rátót's castle situated

After the death of Andrew III and the extinction of the Árpád dynasty in 1301, he supported the claim of the twelve-year-old Wenceslaus of Přemyslid in the emerging civil war, alongside the other members of his clan. He was a member of that Hungarian delegation, which traveled to Bohemia and offered the crown to the young prince. His father, the Bohemian king Wenceslaus II met the Hungarian envoys in Hodonín in early August and accepted their offer in his son's name. When Wenceslaus II accompanied his son to Hungary, and encamped at Kočín on 12 August, he issued a royal charter, in which – without any legal basis – he donated the village of Várkony in Szolnok County to Kakas for his loyal service. It is plausible that Kakas had an important role in the negotiations in Bohemia, and was one of the key supporters of the young Wenceslaus along with Dominic. Kakas was styled as Master of the horse by a royal document of Wenceslaus in early 1303.

As Wenceslaus' position in Hungary had dramatically weakened in the previous years, his father decided to take him back to Bohemia in the summer of 1304. He even took the Holy Crown of Hungary with himself to Prague. Soon, Kakas took an oath of allegiance to Charles of Anjou, along with his cousin Roland II. When Charles made an alliance with his cousin Rudolph III of Austria against Bohemia, in Pressburg (now Bratislava in Slovakia) on 24 August, Kakas was also present as one of his supporters. Kakas attended the Diet of Rákos on 10 October 1307, which confirmed Charles' claim to the throne. Alongside his brothers, Dominic and Ladislaus, he was present at the national assembly on 27 November 1308 in Pest, where Charles was unanimously proclaimed king. His person was represented by Dominic at the second coronation of Charles I on 15 June 1309. Kakas bravely fought against the troops of Matthew Csák in the 1300s, when the powerful oligarch threatened the Rátóts' domain in Nógrád County. Kakas participated in the royal military campaign against the sons of Amadeus Aba in the summer of 1312. He was killed in the Battle of Rozgony on 15 June 1312, in the king's surroundings. Charles I commemorated his loyal soldier with a warm heart even in 1323, and forbade all judicial courts to judge him, or his son John, or even his offspring, for any injustice and domination committed by them.

== Sources ==
- Engel, Pál (1996). Magyarország világi archontológiája, 1301–1457, I [Secular Archontology of Hungary, 1301–1457, Volume I] (in Hungarian). História, MTA Történettudományi Intézete. ISBN 963-8312-44-0.
- Kádár, Tamás (2014). "Egy hűséges báró a XIII–XIV. század fordulóján. Rátót nembeli "Porc" István fia Domonkos nádor [A Loyal Baron at the Turn of 13th and 14th Centuries: Palatine Dominic, son of Stephen the "Porc" from the Kindred Rátót]". Fons (in Hungarian). 21 (3). Szentpétery Imre Történettudományi Alapítvány: 267–288. ISSN 1217-8020.
- Kristó, Gyula (1999). "I. Károly király főúri elitje (1301–1309) [The Aristocratic Elite of King Charles I, 1301–1309]". Századok (in Hungarian). 133 (1). Magyar Történelmi Társulat: 41–62. ISSN 0039-8098.
- Zsoldos, Attila (2011). Magyarország világi archontológiája, 1000–1301 [Secular Archontology of Hungary, 1000–1301] (in Hungarian). História, MTA Történettudományi Intézete. ISBN 978-963-9627-38-3.

Kakas Genus Rátót Born: ? Died: 15 June 1312
Political offices
Preceded by John Csák (?)	Master of the horse 1303	Succeeded by John Aba (?)
