= Dominic II Rátót =

13th to 14th Century Hungarian lord

Dominic (II) Rátót

Palatine of Hungary
- Reign: 1315–1320
- Predecessor: James Borsa
- Successor: Dózsa Debreceni
- Born: early 1260s
- Died: after August 1320
- Noble family: gens Rátót
- Issue: Dominic Pásztói; Stephen IV
- Father: Stephen I
- Mother: first wife of his father

Dominic (II) from the kindred Rátót (Hungarian: Rátót nembeli (II.) Domokos; died 1320) was a Hungarian powerful lord at the turn of the 13th and 14th centuries, who served as Palatine of Hungary from 1315 to 1320. At the beginning of his career, he was a staunch supporter of Andrew III of Hungary, serving his Master of the treasury for a decade. He retained his office after the extinction of the Árpád dynasty too, during the short reign of Wenceslaus.

Dominic, with the assistance of his brothers and cousins, established a province, which mostly laid in Nógrád and Heves counties, thus he was among the so-called oligarchs, who ruled de facto independently their dominions during the era of feudal anarchy. In this capacity, he had various conflicts with the most powerful oligarch Matthew Csák. After Wenceslaus' departure from Hungary, Dominic supported the claim of Charles I, becoming his ardent partisan until his death in 1320. Dominic was the ancestor of the Pásztói family, which flourished until the early 16th century.

== Family ==
Dominic II was presumably born in the early 1260s into the prestigious and influential gens (clan) Rátót, as the son of Stephen I ("the Porc"), who was a strong confidant of Queen Elizabeth the Cuman and held several offices in her court since 1265. It is plausible that Stephen's only known wife Aglent Smaragd was not the mother of Dominic; she was still alive in 1327, and was a Beguine nun at the Sibylla cloister in Buda. Her brothers, Ladislaus and Aynard were active courtiers even in 1350. Dominic's uncle was the powerful baron Roland I. Dominic had four known brothers: Lawrence was killed in the Battle of Lake Hód (near present-day Hódmezővásárhely) in 1282. Ladislaus was Ban of Slavonia in 1300 and ancestor of the Tari family. Kakas was Master of the horse and was killed in the Battle of Rozgony in 1312. He was forefather of the Kakas de Kaza noble family. The youngest brother was Leustach III (also "the Great"). He was first mentioned by contemporary records only in 1338, thus he was presumably much younger than his late brothers, and his mother was perhaps Aglent Smaragd. Beyond the members of the Rátót kindred, Nicholas Pok was also his cousin.

Dominic had two sons from his unidentified wife. The elder one Dominic III (also "the Great") took the surname Pásztói (sometimes also Hasznosi) after his land centre Pásztó. The noble family flourished until the early 16th century. The younger son, Stephen IV was mentioned only once by a document in 1323.

== Andrew's partisan ==
Dominic is first mentioned by three non-authentic charters from 1283. The first document narrates a lawsuit and a subsequent agreement within the kindred following the division of their estates. Accordingly, Dominic was granted Pata and Szentgyörgy in Somogy County, Selpe in Pozsony County, Putnok and Feled (present-day Jesenské, Slovakia) in Gömör County, Kaza in Borsod County, Rátót in Pest County and other lands in Bihar County and Transylvania. The other two documents contain donations of privilege to Pata and Szentgyörgy, as a reward to the members of the kindred, who bravely fought in the previous years against the Cumans. Dominic disappeared from the sources thereafter; he did not hold any royal dignity during the reign of Ladislaus IV of Hungary. Since the 1280s, the wide Rátót kinship started to build their province to northeast of the capital, which laid mostly in Nógrád and Heves counties. Dominic's possessions reached out Borsod and Gömör counties, where the Ákos clan passed a similar way. In many cases, this has involved conflict with the local nobility. According to a treaty, which was signed in Zagyvafő (present-day near Salgótarján) by the Rátóts and the Zagyvafői branch of the Kacsics clan in late 1290, there were serious clashes and confrontations between the two families prior to that. According to the document, the Rátóts attacked and destroyed the three forts – including Szőlős – of Leustach Kacsics, who was also killed along with three family members and countless servants. The treaty was mediated by Palatine Amadeus Aba and Andrew, Bishop of Eger. The members of the Rátót clan, including Dominic pledged that they will rebuild the three forts and pay 200 marks as a compensation. Dominic's degree of participation is unknown, but his involvement in the conflict was proved by his signature in the document.

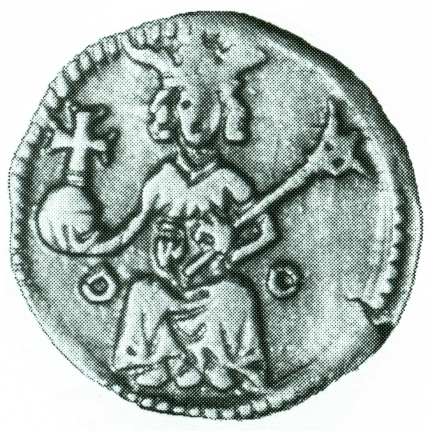
Andrew III's denarius. Dominic Rátót was responsible for the royal economic policy throughout his reign

Dominic was considered a loyal supporter and strong confidant of King Andrew III by December 1291, when he was appointed Master of the treasury, replacing Mojs Ákos. Around the same time, his brother Ladislaus (or Lack) was made Master of the stewards. Dominic served as Master of the treasury throughout the reign of Andrew III, even retaining the dignity after the extinction of the Árpád dynasty. According to historian Bálint Hóman, favorable changes occurred in the state economic policy and the Hungarian central financial administration for the last decade of the 13th century, when Dominic held the office. For instance, high-quality coins with high precious metal content were minted, which have reached the highest level of coins from the reign of Béla IV decades earlier. Andrew's coinage was a popular currency in abroad too. Dominic also standardized the interest rate of the Viennese denarius with banovac (or banski denar). Unfortunately, these reform steps were proved to be temporary, as central economic policy ceased under anarchic conditions in the first two decades of the 14th century.

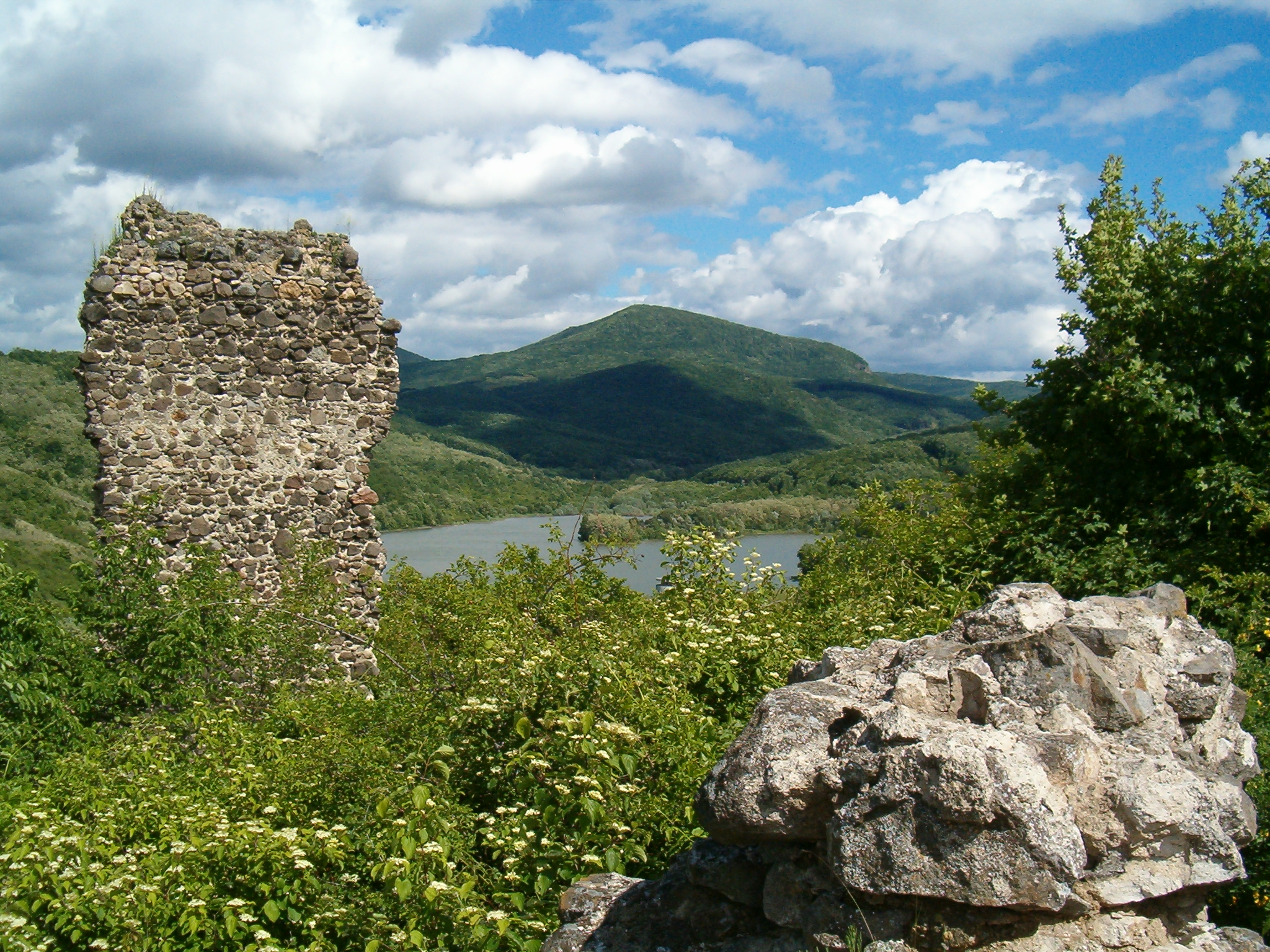
The ruins of Hasznos Castle (present-day near Pásztó), built and owned by Dominic Rátót

Andrew III visited Dominic's estates in Heves County in early 1295, and issued his royal charter in Pásztó on 16 February, which reflects his influence and prestige. Beside his position of Master of the treasury, Dominic was made ispán of Somogy County around December 1297, serving in that capacity at least until October 1299, when he became ispán of Nógrád County. Historian Tamás Kádár argues, he retained both offices after Andrew's death. Andrew III held an assembly of the prelates, noblemen, Saxons, Székelys, and Cumans in Pest in the summer of 1298. Its decrees authorized Andrew to destroy forts built without permission and ordered the punishment of those who had seized landed property with force, but also threatened Andrew with excommunication if he did not apply the decrees. After the close of the diet, Andrew entered into a formal alliance with five influential noblemen – Amadeus Aba, Stephen Ákos, Dominic Rátót, Demetrius Balassa and Paul Szécs – who stated that they were willing to support him against the "rebellious lords", which term definitely covered Matthew Csák and the Kőszegi family. Based on Stephen Ákos' surviving feudal contract, Dominic possibly accepted Andrew as his "natural lord" and swore an oath that will defend his king against his all opponents, even against the Pope, while Andrew committed himself that he will support Dominic and his kinship in their efforts and will make peace with the rebellious lords only with the consent of Dominic. Historian Jenő Szűcs emphasized, the Rátót and Ákos provinces cut off the expanding Csák domain from the royal lands, while Stephen Ákos and Dominic Rátót also received royal support to defend their landholdings and to isolate the Csáks and the Kőszegis from each other.

By the end of the reign of Andrew III, Dominic was considered a provincial lord, who established a huge domain with his brothers and cousins. His lands and villages laid in the borderland of Heves, Nógrád, Gömör and Borsod counties, at the valleys of the rivers Sajó and Rima (Rimava). His territory also spread to the northeast portions of Veszprém and Pest counties. Through his cousin Desiderius Rátót, Dominic also had kinship relationships with his neighbor and ally Stephen Ákos. Dominic exchanged his estates in Szabolcs County for Poroszló and its monastery in February 1299, with Julius Sártványvecse. Initially, he resided in Ágasvár (lit. "Ágas Castle"), a small fort located in the mountain range of Mátra. Following a division contract of estates within the kindred, only his younger brother Ladislaus and his descendants owned the castle. Thereafter Dominic moved to Pásztó permanently, which became the centre of his domain and built there a fortified manor. Under his ownership, the town was granted the right from the Crown to hold fairs and markets in 1298. Near the village of Hasznos (today part of Pásztó), he built his castle by the bank of the Kövecses stream, at the foot of the Western Mátra. His descendants, the Pásztói family possessed the fort until its demolition by the end of the 15th century.

== During the Interregnum ==
The oligarchic provinces in the early 14th century

Andrew III, the last male member of the Árpád dynasty, died on 14 January 1301. Alongside other lords and prelates, Dominic Rátót was present at the king's deathbed in Buda. In the next days, he remained in the capital in the evolving political vacuum, and supported the dowager queen, Agnes of Austria. A civil war between various claimants to the throne – Charles of Anjou, Wenceslaus of Bohemia, and Otto of Bavaria – followed Andrew's death and lasted for seven years. In early 1301, Charles of Anjou hurried to Esztergom where he was crowned king irregularly. Being Pope Boniface VIII's candidate for the Hungarian throne, Charles had always been unpopular, because the Hungarian lords feared that they would "lose their freedom by accepting a king appointed by the Church", as the Illuminated Chronicle narrates. Dominic was among those lords, who supported Wenceslaus, the son of Wenceslaus II of Bohemia, who was not only Béla IV's great-great-grandson, but also the bride of the late Andrew III's daughter, Elizabeth. Dominic was a leading member of that Hungarian delegation, which traveled to Bohemia and offered the crown to the young Wenceslaus. The Bohemian king met the Hungarian envoys in Hodonín in August and accepted their offer in his eleven-year-old son's name. Wenceslaus II accompanied his son to Székesfehérvár where John Hont-Pázmány, Archbishop of Kalocsa, crowned the young Wenceslaus king with the Holy Crown on 27 August 1301.

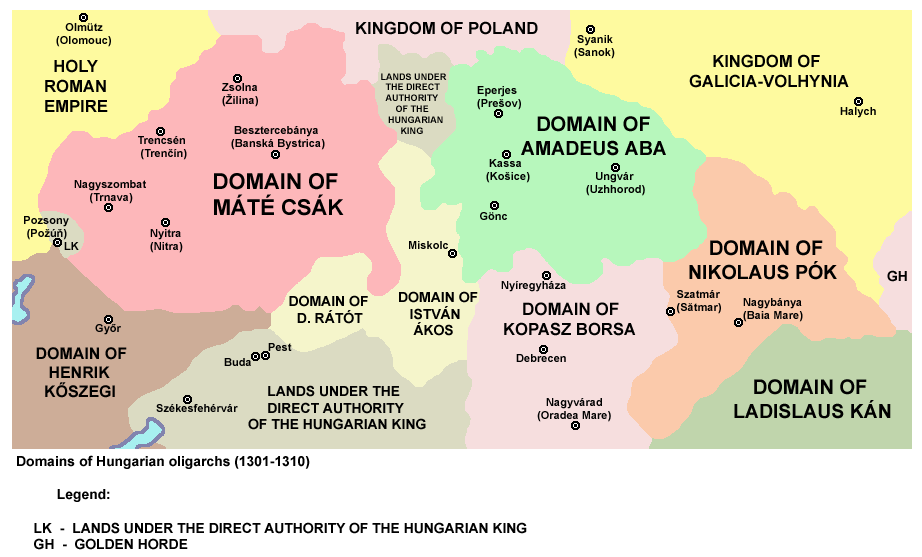
The domain of Dominic Rátót (yellow), which was threatened by Matthew Csák's troops constantly since the 1300s

Dominic Rátót became one of the most illustrious supporters of Wenceslaus, and was also a member of the royal council in Buda. The young king referred to him as Master of the doorkeepers in September 1301. Beside that, Dominic retained his position of Master of the treasury until the second half of 1302, when he was replaced by Henry Kőszegi. While retained his office of ispán of Nógrád County at least until 1303, he was also made ispán of Szepes County in 1302. According to a royal document from 1303, he held the ispánate of Fejér County in that year. Wenceslaus, who spent most of his short reign only in the safe Buda, issued a royal charter in Pásztó on 5 May 1303, enjoying the hospitality and protection of his loyal baron, Dominic Rátót. The king again visited him in Pásztó a year later, in early June 1304. These two visits are the only known occasions, when Wenceslaus left his seat for another place. As Wenceslaus' position in Hungary had dramatically weakened in the previous years, his father decided to take him back to Bohemia in the summer of 1304. He even took the Holy Crown of Hungary with himself to Prague. Based on a donation letter, it is possible that Dominic supported the claim of Otto, after Wenceslaus renounced his claim to Hungary in favor of him on 9 October 1305, and the Bavarian duke arrived to Hungary with the Holy Crown. Otto referred to Dominic as his Master of the treasury in the second half of 1306 in the above-mentioned document, however it is plausible that Otto, who was never able to strengthen his position in Hungary, tried to obtain the support of Dominic with this appointment and land donation. Historian Tamás Kádár considers, Dominic retired from politics after Wenceslaus' departure from Hungary, and did not interfere in the conflict between Charles of Anjou and Otto of Bavaria.

Based on fragmented data from near-contemporary documents, Matthew Csák seriously threatened Dominic's province in the 1300s. When the powerful oligarch attended in a meeting in Kékes in November 1308, three of his five-member escort were noblemen from Nógrád County, which indicates Matthew Csák extended his influence to much of the county at the expense of Dominic. It is plausible that Matthew launched raids and invasions against Dominic's territory after 1304, when Wenceslaus left Hungary. Dominic's temporary retirement from the national politics during that time also supports this assumption. When John III, Bishop of Nyitra excommunicated Matthew Csák in March 1318 for his previous lawlessness against the Church, he referred an incident that the oligarch had formerly imposed extraordinary tax to his subjects in order to ransom the hostages, who were sent to the court of Dominic during their short-lived reconciliation. In 1323, Dominic's sons, Dominic III and Stephen IV remembered that they were imprisoned and sentenced to death by Matthew sometimes earlier. At the cost of serious injuries, they managed to escape from the prison with the assistance of a lady named Cunigunde.

== Charles' partisan ==
Along with his brothers and cousins, for instance Roland II, who styled himself Palatine of Hungary in the 1300s, Dominic took an oath of allegiance to Charles I by 1307. He was present at the Diet of Rákos on 10 October 1307, which confirmed Charles's claim to the throne. The subsequently issued royal charter listed Dominic to the second place among the supportive barons, only Ugrin Csák, Charles' earliest and most ardent partisan preceded him. With the leadership of Dominic II and Roland II (who died in 1307, however), the Rátót clan was the most populous family in the royal court, who joined Charles. He was again made ispán of Nógrád County, according to a document issued in September 1308, but it is possible he held the office without interrupt since 1299 (or 1303). When the papal legate Cardinal Gentile Portino da Montefiore managed to persuade Matthew Csák to accept King Charles' rule at their meeting in the Pauline Monastery of Kékes on 10 November 1308, the oligarch also promised that "he will conclude a just and equitable peace with magister Dominic and other those barons, with whom he had conflict". Thereafter they mutually offered hostages to Thomas II, Archbishop of Esztergom, in order to maintain peace.

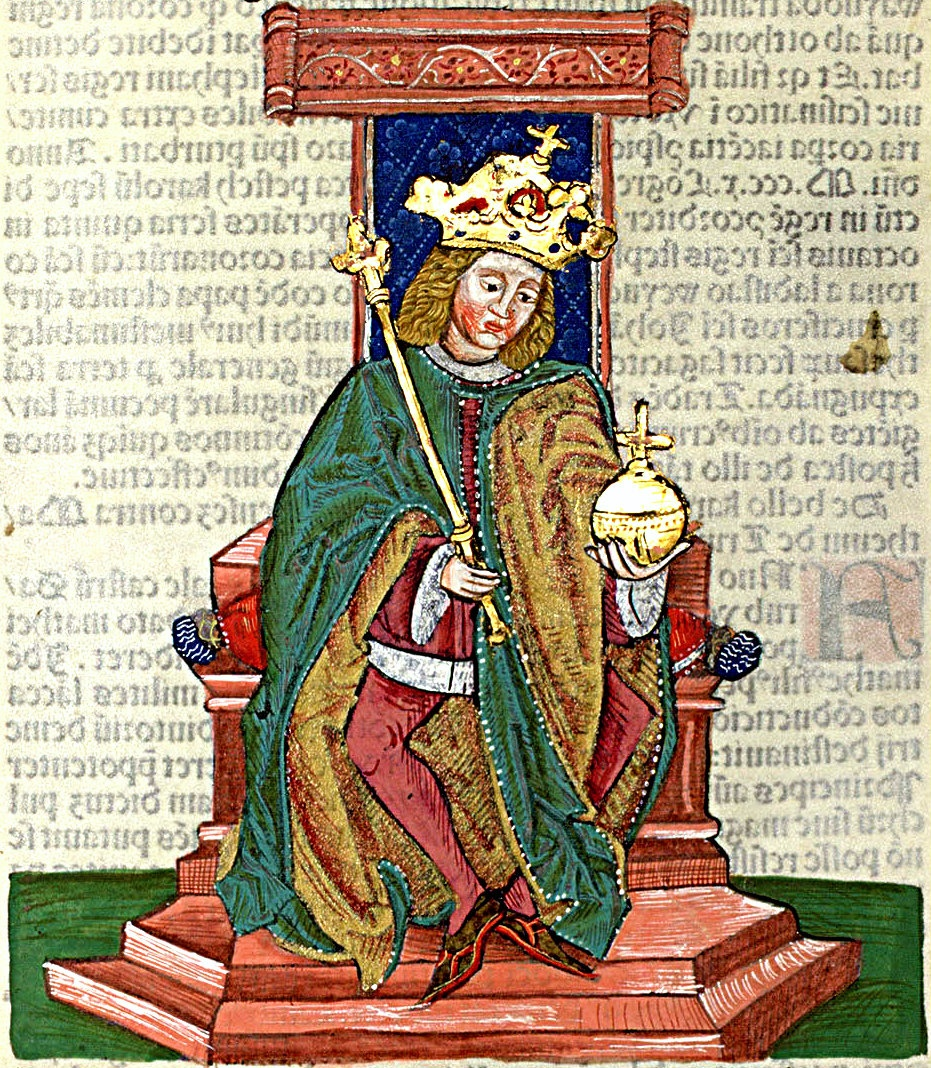
Charles I, as depicted in the 15th-century Chronica Hungarorum

Dominic and his brothers – Ladislaus and Kakas – were present at the following assembly (27 November) in Pest where Charles was unanimously proclaimed king. Dominic also attended the second coronation of Charles I on 15 June 1309, representing his brothers and the whole kindred too. As the Transylvanian oligarch, Ladislaus Kán refused to recover the Holy Crown, which he possessed after Otto's capture and imprisonment, most Hungarian lords regarded Charles' second coronation with a temporary crown invalid. Thereafter Amadeus Aba and Dominic Rátót escorted Archbishop Thomas, who negotiated with the voivode in Szeged on 8 April 1310, on the conditions of return of the crown. Ladislaus Kán finally agreed to give the Holy Crown to Charles. On 27 August 1310, Archbishop Thomas put the Holy Crown on Charles' head in Székesfehérvár; thus, Charles' third coronation was performed in full accordance with customary law.

For his loyalty and service, Dominic Rátót was made treasurer of the queenly court of Charles' wife Mary of Bytom. Two documents from August and November 1313 (the latter was preserved from only 18th-century transcriptions) mentioned him in this capacity, but it is possible that he already held the dignity since 1310. When James Borsa rebelled against the king in late 1314 or early 1315, he was dismissed as Palatine by Charles. Dominic Rátót was first referred to as his successor in August 1315, but it is presumable that he already obtained the position at least in February. The importance of the position was overshadowed by the dignity Master of the treasury during the first period of the Angevin (Anjou) rule. For instance, treasurer Demetrius Nekcsei almost always preceded Dominic in the lists of barons, which were part of the royal charters. Tamás Kádár considers Charles chose Dominic to the position, because he remained the only prestigious and experienced baron in the royal court, who has maintained his loyalty; in 1314–15, Charles' rule came to a turning point. The oligarchic powers rebelled against him one after another. Simultaneously, Charles transferred his residence from Buda to Temesvár (present-day Timișoara, Romania) in early 1315, and launched his unification war against the provinces. Dominic realized the situation that he can defend his interests and landholdings against the neighboring Csák and Aba domains, if he does not only cooperate with the central power, but also actively helps the monarch against the violent and disloyal provincial lords. After his appointment, he was granted the confiscated lands of three noblemen in Nógrád County in September 1315, who were considered strong supporters of Matthew Csák. One of these sanctioned nobles was Felician Záh, who became infamous for his assassination attempt against Charles and his family in 1330.

Despite Dominic held the dignity for five years, he is one of the least knowable palatines of the era due to the lack of sources. He issued only one private nature document, while his possible vice-palatine or permanent court were not mentioned, in addition to the counties, which he was granted as source of income (honor). Historian Tibor Szőcs argues Dominic resided constantly in the royal court at Temesvár, and because of the war conditions, he never visited the rest of the country and made no judgments. Dominic was a member of the royal council and often gave advice to Charles. His predecessors and successors represented a different institutional style. Because of the unification war, Dominic was only palatine in title, but not in practice. Historian Attila Zsoldos considers the counties of Pest, Fejér and Esztergom, in addition to the privileged Pechenegs of Sárvíz (Latin: comitatus Byssenorum), belonged to his honor, while he functioned as Palatine of Hungary. Zsoldos argues Stephen Sáfár, the castellan of Visegrád and John Hencfi, judge of Buda were commissioned as acting judges of the aforementioned territories in January 1321, shortly after Dominic's death. In accordance with Zsoldos' theory, Archbishop Thomas nominally remained the perpetual count of Esztergom, but the county and its castle was managed by Dominic Rátót because of its strategic importance in the war against Matthew Csák and the Kőszegis (Esztergom was besieged and captured several times in the previous decade). Dominic was last mentioned as a living person by sources in August 1320. He died soon. He was succeeded as Palatine by Dózsa Debreceni after one and half years period of vacancy in the end of 1321 or early 1322.

== Sources ==
- Engel, Pál (1996). Magyarország világi archontológiája, 1301–1457, I [Secular Archontology of Hungary, 1301–1457, Volume I] (in Hungarian). História, MTA Történettudományi Intézete. ISBN 963-8312-44-0.
- Kádár, Tamás (2014). "Egy hűséges báró a XIII–XIV. század fordulóján. Rátót nembeli "Porc" István fia Domonkos nádor [A Loyal Baron at the Turn of 13th and 14th Centuries: Palatine Dominic, son of Stephen the "Porc" from the Kindred Rátót]". Fons (in Hungarian). 21 (3). Szentpétery Imre Történettudományi Alapítvány: 267–288. ISSN 1217-8020.
- Kristó, Gyula (1973). Csák Máté tartományúri hatalma [The Provincial Lordship of Matthew Csák] (in Hungarian). Akadémiai Kiadó.
- Kristó, Gyula (1999). "I. Károly király főúri elitje (1301–1309) [The Aristocratic Elite of King Charles I, 1301–1309]". Századok (in Hungarian). 133 (1). Magyar Történelmi Társulat: 41–62. ISSN 0039-8098.
- Markó, László (2006). A magyar állam főméltóságai Szent Istvántól napjainkig: Életrajzi Lexikon [Great Officers of State in Hungary from King Saint Stephen to Our Days: A Biographical Encyclopedia] (in Hungarian). Helikon Kiadó. ISBN 963-208-970-7.
- Szőcs, Tibor (2014). A nádori intézmény korai története, 1000–1342 [An Early History of the Palatinal Institution: 1000–1342] (in Hungarian). Magyar Tudományos Akadémia Támogatott Kutatások Irodája. ISBN 978-963-508-697-9.
- Szűcs, Jenő (2002). Az utolsó Árpádok [The Last Árpáds] (in Hungarian). Osiris Kiadó. ISBN 963-389-271-6.
- Zsoldos, Attila (2011). Magyarország világi archontológiája, 1000–1301 [Secular Archontology of Hungary, 1000–1301] (in Hungarian). História, MTA Történettudományi Intézete. ISBN 978-963-9627-38-3.
- Zsoldos, Attila (2012). "Rátót nembéli Domokos nádor megyéi [The Counties of Palatine Dominic from the Kindred Rátót]". In Mikó, Gábor; Péterfi, Bence; Vadas, András (eds.). Tiszteletkör: Történeti tanulmányok Draskóczy István egyetemi tanár 60. születésnapjára (in Hungarian). Eötvös Loránd University. pp. 47–52. ISBN 978-963-312-095-8.

Dominic II Genus Rátót Born: 1260s Died: 1320
Political offices
Preceded by Mojs Ákos	Master of the treasury 1291–1302	Succeeded by Henry Kőszegi
Preceded by James Borsa	Palatine of Hungary; 1315–1320	Succeeded by Dózsa Debreceni
