= Stephen IV Babonić =

Croatian nobleman and oligarch

Stephen (IV) Babonić
- Lord of Steničnjak
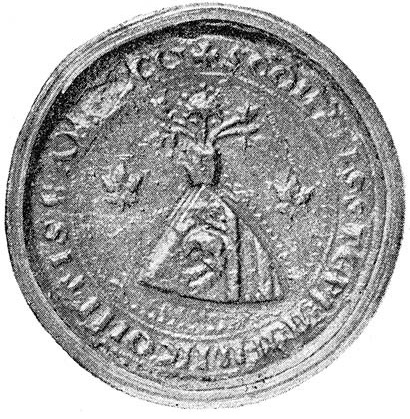
- Seal of Stephen Babonić, 1316

Ban of Slavonia
- Reign: 1299; 1310–1316
- Predecessor: James Borsa (1st term); Henry Kőszegi (2nd term)
- Successor: Ladislaus Rátót (1st term); John Babonić (2nd term)
- Died: after March 1316
- Noble family: House of Babonić
- Issue: George; John II; Denis; Paul
- Father: Baboneg II

Stephen (IV) Babonić (Croatian: Stjepan IV. Babonić, Hungarian: Babonics (IV.) István; died after March 1316) was a powerful Croatian lord at the turn of the 14th century, who was Ban of Slavonia in 1299 and from 1310 until his death. He was a member of the influential Babonić family.

As one of the oligarchs in the kingdoms of Hungary and Croatia during the era of feudal anarchy, he established a domain in Lower Slavonia (area south of the river Sava) and ruled it de facto independently of the monarch. Stephen ruled from his stronghold Steničnjak, thus he was also known as Stephen of Steničnjak (Croatian: Stjepan od Steničnjaka, Hungarian: Sztenicsnyáki István). At the peak of his power, he was styled "Duke of Slavonia" (Latin: dux Slavoniae) by foreign sources.

== Early career ==
Stephen (IV) was born into the Krupa branch of the powerful Babonić family, as the second son of Baboneg or Babonjeg (II). His elder brother was Nicholas (I), who died early. His younger brothers were John (I) – a skilled military leader and baron –, Otto and Radoslav (II) – the latter was the progenitor of the Blagaj family, including its cadet branch, the Counts of Ursini de Blagay.

Stephen is first mentioned by contemporary records in November 1278, when – alongside other members of his family, including his brother Nicholas – he stayed in Zagreb on the occasion of the reconciliation of the Babonići and the Gutkeleds after a series of clashes and hostilities in Slavonia. At that time, the Babonić family was headed by his cousins Stephen (III) and Radoslav (I), who had led the rebellion in the province against the authority of King Ladislaus IV of Hungary in the previous year. Both Nicholas and Stephen were present in October 1280 at Ozalj Castle along the river Kupa, when the family's local enemies the Kőszegis concluded peace with the Babonići and Frankopans. In 1284, Stephen and his four brothers bought the land at Pelava along the stream Buzeta for 12 silver marks from Jazen (I), Senk and Isan (II), members of the gens (clan) Rata. In the central Banovina region, the Babonić brothers had already purchased the hereditary estates of Kresnić, Bojna and Buzeta from the clan Rata. These were estates on the northern slopes of Zrinska Gora towards the valley of the river Maja.

As a result of the acquisitions of his cousins, the Babonići became the most influential family in Slavonia; their landholdings stretching from the river Vrbas in the east, to the river Kupa and the border with the Holy Roman Empire in the west, and to the slopes of the Kapela Mountains in the south. Their social status is illustrated by the fact that Nicholas (I) and Stephen (IV), alongside their cousins Stephen (III) and Radoslav (I), were among those barons to whom Pope Nicholas IV sent a letter in 1290, informing them that he had appointed papal legate Benvenuto d'Orvieto, and requesting their assistance in persuading Ladislaus IV to return to Christianity.

== Lord of Lower Slavonia ==
=== Between the Árpáds and Angevins ===
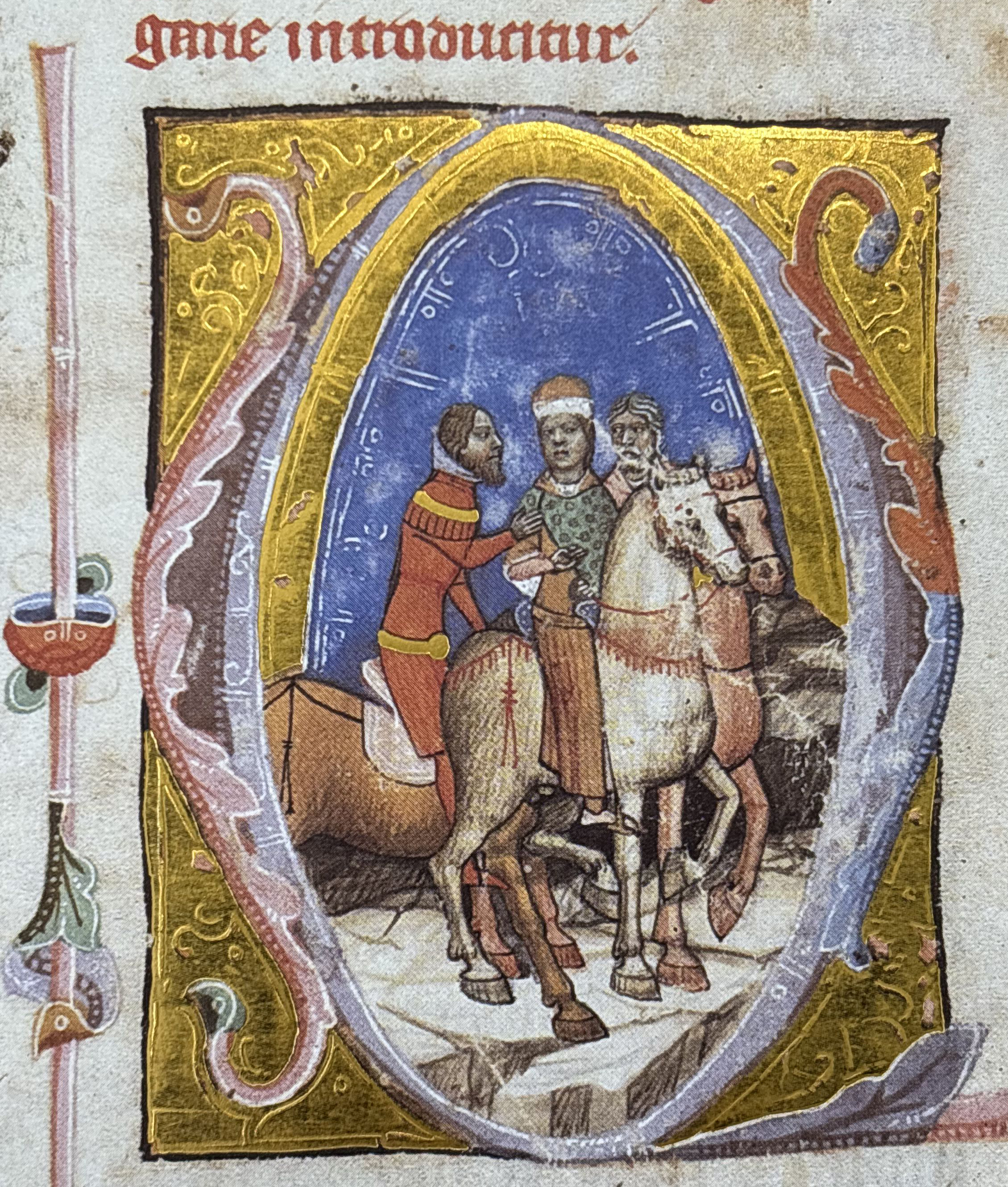
Charles of Anjou's arrival in Hungary, depicted in the Illuminated Chronicle

In the 1290s, the Babonići and other leading Croatian and Slavonian noble families balanced their loyalties between Andrew III of Hungary and the rival Capetian House of Anjou's claim for the Hungarian–Croatian throne. By the second half of the decade, when their cousins Stephen (III) and Radoslav (I) died, Stephen (IV) became head of the family (Nicholas had also died by then) and was frequently seated in Steničnjak. In 1299 and 1300, Stephen and his brothers sent their envoys to the Kingdom of Naples to negotiate with Charles II of Anjou. Meanwhile, they also swore loyalty to Andrew III, who confirmed their inherited and acquired possessions in August 1299. The king retook the castles Susedgrad, Vrbas and Glaž, but he allowed them to inherit the forts and other possessions of the late Radoslav (I), who died without male heirs. Andrew III also appointed Stephen as Ban of Slavonia at that time. He styled himself "ban" until the end of his life regardless of royal approval or appointment. Andrew III expected the Babonići to be important defenders of the border, as these castles were adjacent to the territory of Hrvatin Stjepanić, who supported the Angevin claim to the throne. In September 1299, Charles II and Mary confirmed all rights and possessions, in addition to the hereditary title Ban of Slavonia to the four Babonić brothers – Stephen (IV), John (I), Otto and Radoslav (II). In contrast, Antun Nekić argued the charter was not a confirmation of their possessions but a confirmation of the territory under their control, and the Babonići began to see their rule outside the framework of what was considered the province of Slavonia, which meant that the title of ban also became obsolete for them. In November 1299, Charles II confirmed the estates of the late Radoslav (I) to the brothers, who wanted all the estates of their cousin, including probably, although not mentioned, those towns that King Andrew had kept for himself, so they sent a petition to Charles II, who essentially did not care whether he would confirm them to them or not, because he owned nothing in Slavonia anyway.

The young pretender Charles Robert from Naples landed on the Dalmatian coast in 1300. His grandfather, Charles II, upon their request, confirmed the Babonić brothers in May 1300 as rightful possessors over "a part of the land of Slavonia, which by right belongs to the said Kingdom of Hungary, that is, from Germany to Bosnia and from the Sava River to the Iron Mountain". In this way, Stephen and his brothers attempted to recover those castles – Susedgrad, Vrbas and Glaž – that had been taken from them the previous year by King Andrew. Interestingly, the King of Naples did not style Stephen as "ban" and he retained the supreme right (tam ratione maioris dominii) over the Babonić estates. The Babonići sought to maintain good relations with the opposite party too. In May 1300, Stephen and his brothers moved to Zagreb to reconcile with Michael Bő, the Bishop of Zagreb (a confidant of Andrew III), who was forced to hand over much of his authority and jurisdiction to the Babonić family and a mutual assistance agreement was concluded between them. The bishop was also persuaded to pledge Medvedgrad to Stephen and John, and had to renounce his claim to Hrastovica (today a borough of Petrinja). Michael Bő promised that, even in the event of a conflict between the Babonići and the Ban of Slavonia or some other royal barons, he would send them money for mercenaries, though it was clearly emphasized that he would not help them in a conflict with the king. None of the brothers bore the title of ban during the conclusion of the treaty. Albertino Morosini, Duke of Slavonia, confirmed the agreement between Andrew III and the Babonići in June 1300.

=== During the Interregnum ===
Following the death of Andrew III and the extinction of the Árpád dynasty in January 1301, a decade-long interregnum began in Hungary and Croatia. Although the Babonići supported Charles of Anjou against his rivals (Wenceslaus then Otto), the family had almost no contact with the Angevins in those years, since the conflicts of the era took place primarily in Western and Northern Hungary, far from the Babonić province. In that period, Henry Kőszegi was styled Ban of Slavonia, despite the earlier grant to Stephen Babonić and his brothers by Charles II of Naples. Nevertheless, the authority and primacy of Stephen Babonić and his brothers in the territories south of the Sava were unquestionable in the late 1290s and early 1300s. In June 1307, Stephen, John and Radoslav ruled in a lawsuit in favor of the abbot of the Cistercian monastery of St. James in Zagreb. Since the document was drawn up in Steničnjak, the main Babonić stronghold, it can be concluded that the brothers were residing there in mid-1307.

The dominions of the oligarchs, including Stephen Babonić's during the era of interregnum

Due to Charles' little interest or presence in Slavonia and Croatia, the Babonići attempted to find new powerful protectors. Through John's marriage to Clara Euphemia, the daughter of Albert I of Gorizia, they were related to their western neighbors, the House of Gorizia, who ruled Gorizia (Görz) and Tyrol within the Holy Roman Empire. With this connection, the Babonići hoped to build an alliance with the House of Habsburg. The Steirische Reimchronik narrates that, in early spring 1308, Stephen – styled as "Duke of Zagreb" –, John and Radoslav, along with Dujam Frankopan, traveled to Marburg (Maribor) to meet with Frederick the Fair. During the negotiations in March, the Babonići lent 300 Viennese silver denarii to the duke to finance his military campaigns. In return, Frederick pledged several villages in Austria along its border with Hungary to Stephen and his brothers. Stephen and his brothers promised to join a campaign against Bohemia the following year. In the summer of 1308, John joined Frederick's campaign into the Patriarchate of Aquileia, under the command of Ulrich I of Walsee.

Meanwhile, in Hungary, Charles I became the sole monarch of the Hungarian–Croatian kingdom. While John pursued their family's "western policy" (i.e. campaigns into Friuli), Stephen's attention slowly turned to events in Slavonia. Stephen and John were among those barons who greeted the arriving papal legate Gentile Portino da Montefiore in Zagreb in early September 1308. There, a dispute arose over the possession right of Medvedgrad between Stephen Babonić and Augustin Kažotić, the Bishop of Zagreb. The legate ruled in favor of Stephen. In addition, the costs of maintaining the castle, in addition to paying the garrison and supplying them with wine, fell on the cathedral chapter in accordance with the verdict. The Babonići did not attend the Diet of Hungary in Pest, where Charles I was unanimously proclaimed king on 27 November 1308. The Babonić brothers were not present personally at the second coronation of Charles on 15 June 1309 either; they sent their envoy Peter, the archdeacon of Čazma. In September 1309, Stephen and his brothers (John and Radoslav) swore to protect the rights of Bishop Augustin Kažotić to the estates that were being contested by the Lastić (Laztech) and Stanković (Stankouch) families of castle warrior origin, at the behest of Charles I. Antun Nekić argued that it is a clear sign that Charles acknowledged the practical distribution of power in Slavonia, as he was well aware that Henry Kőszegi, despite his dignity of Ban of Slavonia, was not in position to carry out a royal order in the dominion of the Babonići.

=== Ban of Slavonia ===
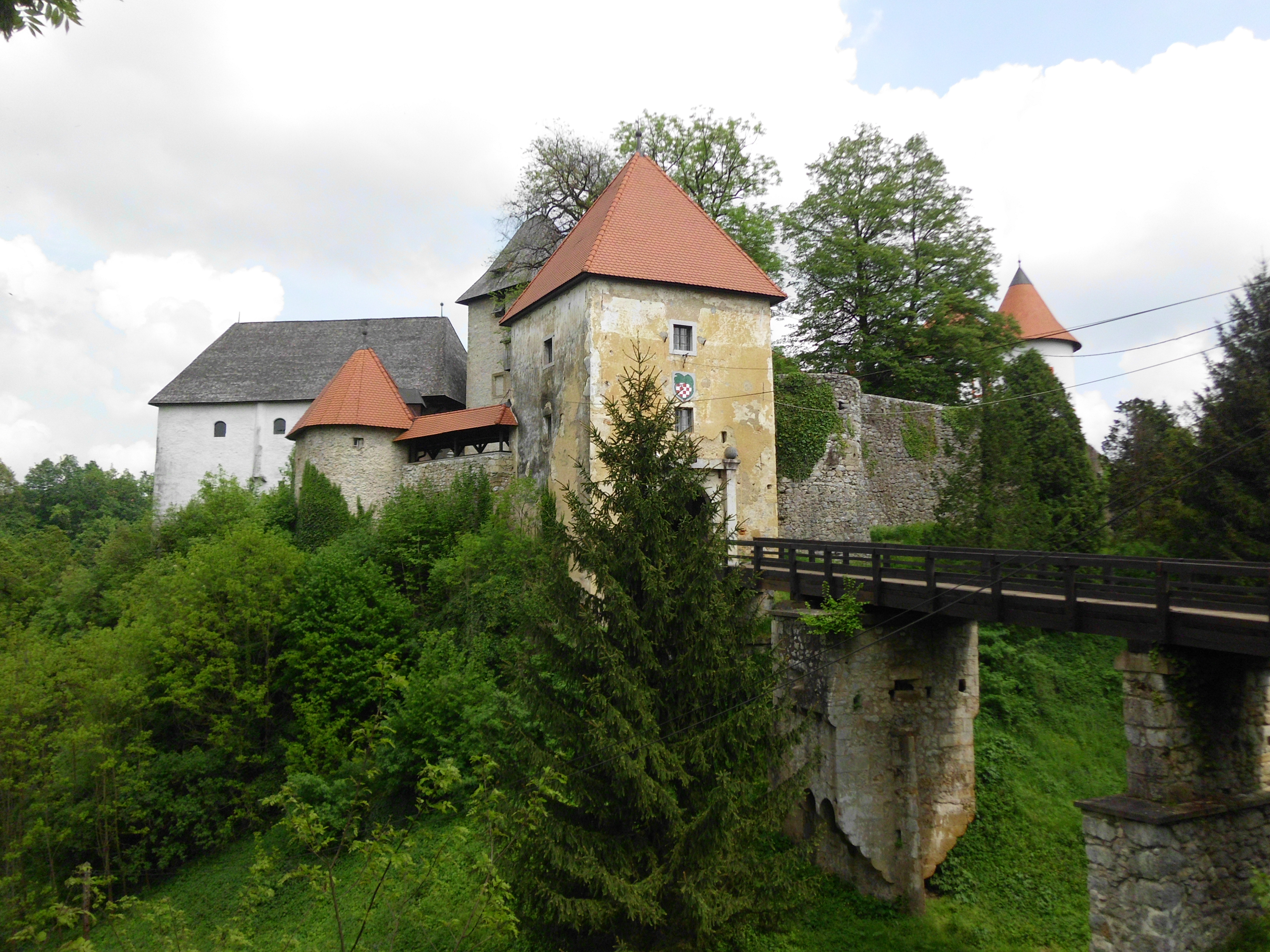
Entrance of Ozalj Castle

Henry Kőszegi, the powerful oligarch who ruled Upper Slavonia for decades died in the spring of 1310. Charles I appointed Stephen Babonić as his successor sometime thereafter. He first appears in this capacity on 27 August 1310, when the monarch instructed him and his two brothers to protect the rights of the citizens of Gradec, Zagreb on the nearby estate named Kobila. Since this date coincides with the day of Charles' third and finally valid coronation, it is likely that all three brothers attended the ceremony in Székesfehérvár. According to Hungarian historian Lajos Thallóczy, Stephen's appointment was reflected by the fact that "the king had no reason to distrust him and appointed the first person suitable for the position as his deputy [in Slavonia]". Gyula Kristó argued that Stephen Babonić possessed the most extensive domains in the province, so his appointment fits the pattern of medieval officials in medieval Slavonia. Croatian historian Hrvoje Kekez considered that Stephen was probably chosen because he was the leader of one of the two most powerful families in Slavonia (the other was the Kőszegis), and was also very strong financially, thus his informal rule over the province was granted subsequent royal approval and consent. Charles also sought to remove the Babonići from the Habsburgs' sphere of interest with this award. With the appointment of Stephen as the Ban of Slavonia, the Babonić family reached the peak of its power.

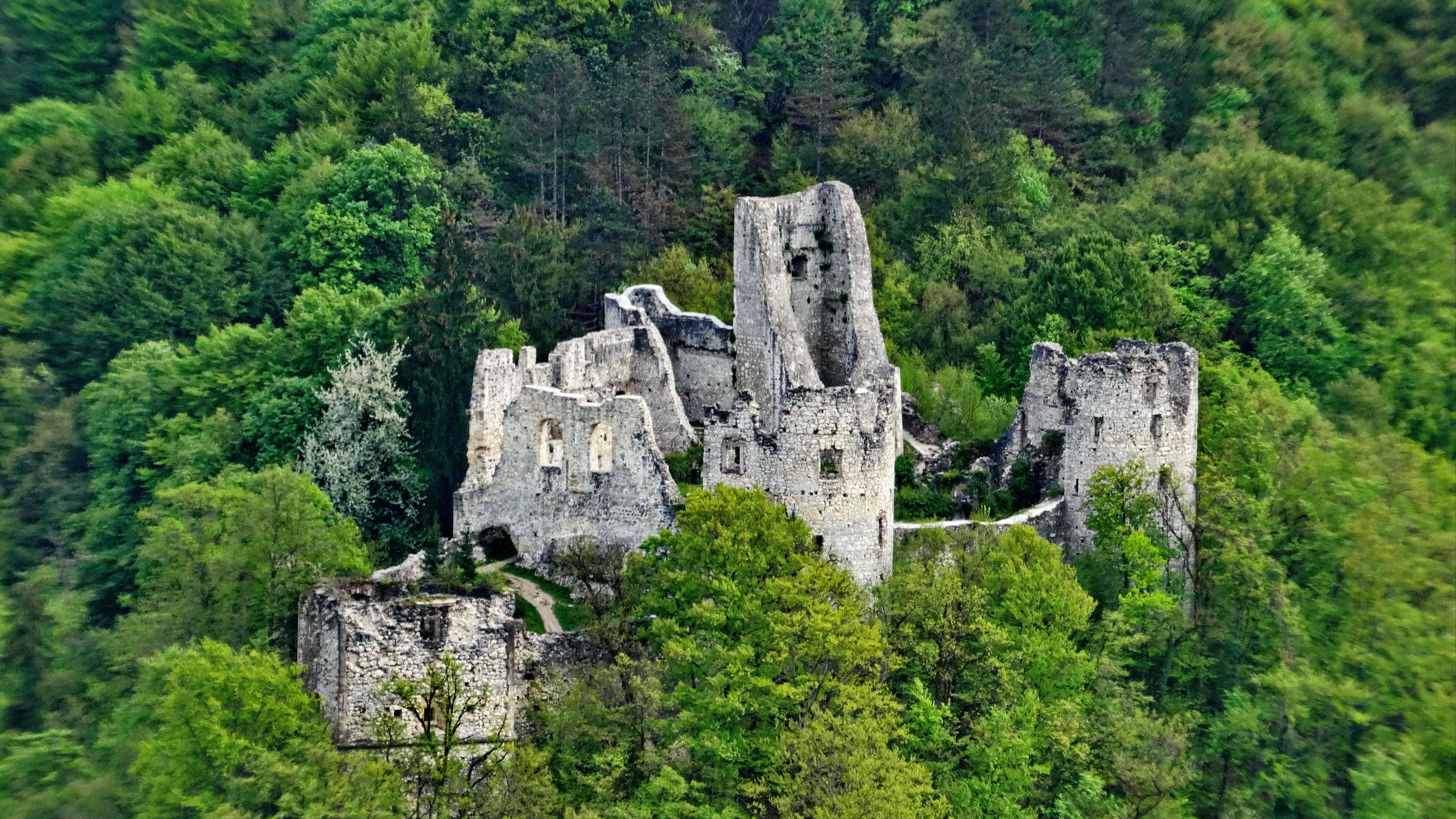
The ruins of Samobor Castle in Croatia

Stephen administered Slavonia almost completely autonomously without the king's interference in his rule. Hrvoje Kekez argued the stability in Slavonia was essential for Charles who waged war against the oligarchs in Northeast Hungary, the opposite side of his realm. Hungarian historian Attila Zsoldos argued Stephen was among those "loyal" oligarchs, who possessed everything with royal consent that he had previously acquired without it. His power did not extend beyond his own domain, as the sons of Henry Kőszegi and their allies still firmly controlled the northern half of Slavonia in the first half of the 1310s. Under Stephen, the Babonići possessed altogether approximately 20 castles in the region, for instance, Ozalj, Samobor, Susedgrad, Želin, most of them in Zagreb County. The centre of Stephen's oligarchic domain was the castle Steničnjak in the valley of the river Kupa, then the largest fort in Slavonia. As a result, contemporary sources also refers to him as "Stephen of Steničnjak". Already in August 1310, Stephen Babonić sent a written message to the Republic of Venice that their merchants could freely travel and trade in the area where his authority extended. During this occasion, Stephen referred to Pietro Gradenigo, the Doge of Venice, as his "lord" and "friend". In January 1311, Stephen – fulfilling Charles' order – instructed Martin, his castellan at Medvedgrad to, together with the canons of the Zagreb Chapter, carry out the determination of the borders of the Kobila estate, and to re-instate the burghers of Gradec to the ownership. The latter was previously challenged by local noble Farkas Gárdony, but the burghers proved the legal basis of their claim to present the royal charter of Ladislaus IV of Hungary from 1275 and its confirmation of then-ban Ivan Kőszegi and Inus, ispán of Zagreb County from the same year.

Since his power extended over a wide area of medieval Slavonia, he exercised it primarily with the help of the local nobility, whom he attracted by granting him possessions in the counties where his oligarchic domain extended. For instance, his familiaris George, son of Ozaj enjoyed the special favor of the ban, to whom Stephen, during his stay in the Steničnjak fortress, granted the estate of Kamensko (a borough of present-day Karlovac) in the castle district Gorica in 1311. Two years later, in November 1313, this George was granted the estate of Švarča along the river Korana by Stephen Babonić for the faithful service he had rendered to him and his sons. It is plausible that George administered Gorica on behalf of Stephen. A certain Ladiha played a similar role in Vrbas County. Bishop Augustin Kažotić seized an unnamed estate from his minor sons in November 1312, donating it to Peter, cantor of Zagreb Chapter. The closeness of Ban Stephen and Prince Ladiha is evidenced by the fact that he and his brothers, John (I) and Radoslav (II), were appointed guardians of Ladiha's minor sons.

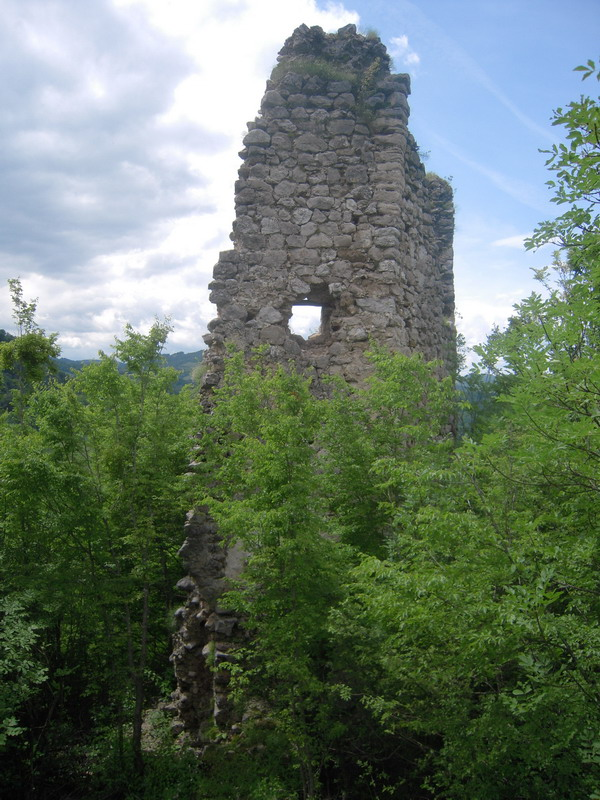
The ruins of Vrbas Castle (today in Bosnia and Herzegovina

In June 1313, the three brothers undertook a journey with large entourages each of them to the Cistercian abbey of Topusko, where, before Bishop Augustin Kažotić, decided to divide their inherited possessions between each other. Stephen was granted the whole income Chamber of Zagreb and the all income that the ban collected from the services he performed in the royal administrative apparatus, while the income from the ports, accessories and the thirtieth was shared between them. They allowed the widow of the late Radoslav (I) to receive usufruct rights to her husband's estates for the rest of her life. Several of his familiares escorted Stephen, including cantor Peter. Furthermore, it was agreed that each of them would independently collect income and tribute from the serf settlements from the estates they managed and for which they were known to be paid. In terms of judicial authority, it was agreed that the one who was able would judge in the joint or smaller courts, but in the case of more significant litigation, it was necessary for all three to meet. Moreover, it was agreed that the free nobles of this kingdom were free to serve with their lands whomever they chose, if this was not contrary to the documents of donations or contracts. After dissatisfaction, John initiated a second division agreement between the Babonići which was concluded on 12 May 1314. Accordingly, Stephen was granted the customs in Upper Slavonia with the stronghold Steničnjak. According to the document, Stephen accumulated debts of 2,370 marks for the administration of the common estates. Stephen was also granted the income from the tolls of Samobor, Susedgad, the royal port and a share in the income from the toll on the Kupa. Likewise, the ban belongs to 10 marks from the revenue from the customs office Lipe, as well as revenues from customs offices in Glaž, Vrbas, Pukurtu, Hrastovica, Jastrebarsko and in Topusko. At the latter place, despite their agreement, the right had belonged to the Cistercians since 1211. As a result, the monks tried in the following years to secure the right to enjoy the property that had been theirs towards the end of the last century granted by Ban Stephen (III) Babonić, probably fearing that these properties would be contested by the then extremely powerful cousins of the late lord. Thus, in July 1315, the Zagreb Chapter, at the request of friar Henry, the cellarer of the monastery in Topusko copied and confirmed the grant of the late Stephen (III) for the properties between rivers Granj, Bročina and Maja to the Topusko monastery. The still living Ladislaus, son of Stephen personally confirmed the former land donation.

Frederick the Fair, King of the Romans, while forgiving his debt of 350 silver marks for his "faithful services to the empire", styled Stephen Babonić as "Duke of Slavonia" (Latin: dux Slavoniae) in February 1316. Hrvoje Kekez considered that Frederick's generosity lies in the fact that he intended to convince Stephen to join him and his brother Leopold the Glorious to their war led against their rival Louis the Bavarian for the imperial crown. Louis supported the victorious three Swiss cantons against the Habsburgs at the Battle of Morgarten in 1315. Finding themselves on the defensive, the Habsburgs intended to launch a new campaign in the County of Gorizia in order to secure the imperial throne. Apparently, Stephen Babonić seriously intended to join the imperial army and, according to a preserved short note from January 1316, he received arms with the intention of setting out for Gorizia in March, but this campaign ultimately did not take place.

== Legacy ==
Stephen Babonić is last mentioned as a living person on 1 March 1316, when he bought the land Mirkopolje (present-day a borough of Krašić) for 70 marks from the Priba clan. The newly acquired estate was adjacent to Stephen's lands in the area of the river Krupa. Stephen died sometime after, plausibly still in that year. With the approval of Charles, he was succeeded as Ban of Slavonia by his last living brother John Babonić, who also inherited his oligarchic domain and power. John is first mentioned in this capacity in May 1317. The Croatian historiography (for instance, Kekez) incorrectly dates Charles' royal charter which contains Ban John's merits to 20 December 1316. In fact, it was issued a year later. Stephen himself is first referred to as a deceased person on 29 November 1317, when Charles I confirmed the earlier donations of the Kobila estate to the city of Zagreb.

Stephen and his unidentified wife had four sons – George, John (II), Denis and Paul. When their uncle was appointed Stephen's successor, they rebelled against the decision, but later reconciled with the king and their uncle. John (II) was even adopted by his namesake uncle, who had no surviving male descendants, in 1321. After John Babonić was dismissed from power in late 1322, the power of Babonići collapsed within months. Stephen's sons, concluding an alliance with the Kőszegis and the House of Habsburg, rebelled against Charles in 1327 and 1336 too, but their revolts were crushed easily. Denis and Paul swore loyalty to the king, then they served Louis I of Hungary too, who donated the castle of Krupa to them in 1361. Thereafter, both of them adopted the "Krupski" (Krupai) family name. Stephen's branch became extinct in 1381, when Paul died without descendants. Their lands had escheat to the crown, despite the claims of the relative Blagaj family.

== Sources ==
- Engel, Pál (1996). Magyarország világi archontológiája, 1301–1457, I. [Secular Archontology of Hungary, 1301–1457, Volume I] (in Hungarian). História, MTA Történettudományi Intézete. ISBN 963-8312-44-0.
- Kádár, Tamás (2017). "Harcban a koronáért. (II.) I. Károly (Róbert) király uralkodásának 1306–1310 közötti szakasza [Fight for the Crown. The Reign of Charles I (Robert) from 1306 to 1310]". Történeti Tanulmányok. Acta Universitatis Debreceniensis (in Hungarian). 25: 126–192. ISSN 1217-4602.
- Kekez, Hrvoje (2008). "Između dva kralja: plemićki rod Babonića u vrijeme promjene na ugarsko-hrvatskom prijestolju, od 1290. do 1309. godine [Between two kings: the Babonić family in the period of dynastic succession on the Croatian and Hungarian throne, 1290–1310]". Povijesni prilozi (in Croatian). 35. Croatian Institute of History: 61–89. ISSN 0351-9767.
- Kekez, Hrvoje (2011). Plemićki rod Babonića do kraja 14. stoljeća [The Noble Babonići Kindred until the End of the Fourteenth Century] (in Croatian). Doctoral thesis, University of Zagreb.
- Kristó, Gyula (1979). A feudális széttagolódás Magyarországon [Feudal Anarchy in Hungary] (in Hungarian). Akadémiai Kiadó. ISBN 963-05-1595-4.
- Markó, László (2006). A magyar állam főméltóságai Szent Istvántól napjainkig: Életrajzi Lexikon [Great Officers of State in Hungary from King Saint Stephen to Our Days: A Biographical Encyclopedia] (in Hungarian). Helikon Kiadó. ISBN 963-547-085-1.
- Nekić, Antun (2015). "The Oligarchs and the King in Medieval Slavonia, 1301–1342". Südost Forschungen. 74 (1): 1–25. doi:10.1515/sofo-2015-0104. ISSN 2364-9321.
- Thallóczy, Lajos (1897). A Blagay-család oklevéltára. Codex diplomaticus comitum de Blagay [The Charters of the Blagay Family] (in Hungarian and Latin). Monumenta Hungariae Historica. Diplomataria 28, Hungarian Academy of Sciences.
- Zsoldos, Attila (2011). Magyarország világi archontológiája, 1000–1301 [Secular Archontology of Hungary, 1000–1301] (in Hungarian). História, MTA Történettudományi Intézete. ISBN 978-963-9627-38-3.
- Zsoldos, Attila (2015). "A királyi hatalom és Szlavónia a 14. század első negyedében / Kraljevska vlast i Slavonija u prvoj četvrtini 14. stoljeća [The Royal Power and Slavonia in the First Quarter of the Fourteenth Century]". In Fodor, Pál; Sokcsevits, Dénes; Turkalj, Jasna; Karbić, Damir (eds.). A horvát-magyar együttélés fordulópontjai: Intézmények, társadalom, gazdaság, kultúra / Prekretnice u suživotu Hrvata i Mađara: Ustanove, društvo, gospodarstvo i kultura [Turning Points of the Croatian-Hungarian Co-habitation: Institutions, Society, Economy and Culture] (in Hungarian and Croatian). MTA Bölcsészettudományi Kutatóközpont Történettudományi Intézet, Hrvatski institut za povijest. pp. 126–136, 184–194. ISBN 978-963-416-019-9.

Stephen IV House of Babonić Born: ? Died: after March 1316
Political offices
Preceded by James Borsa	Ban of Slavonia; 1299	Succeeded by Ladislaus Rátót
Preceded by Henry Kőszegi	Ban of Slavonia; 1310–1316	Succeeded by John Babonić
