= Stephen Rátót =

13th century Hungarian lord

Stephen (I) Rátót

Master of the treasury
- Reign: 1273
- Predecessor: Joachim Gutkeled
- Successor: Joachim Gutkeled
- Died: after 1277
- Noble family: gens Rátót
- Spouses: 1, unidentified 2, Aglent Smaragd
- Issue: (1) Dominic II (1) Lawrence (1) Ladislaus I (1) Kakas (2) Leustach III
- Father: Dominic I

Stephen (I) from the kindred Rátót ("Porc"; Hungarian: Rátót nembeli (I.) "Porc" István; died after 1277) was a Hungarian lord in the 13th century, who served as Master of the treasury. He was a prominent member of the queenly court for years. His acquisitions of lands in Central Hungary proved to be basis for establishment of his clan's province during the era of feudal anarchy.

== Family ==
Stephen was born into the prestigious and influential gens (clan) Rátót, as the son of Dominic I, who was killed in the Battle of Mohi in 1241. Stephen had three brothers, Roland I, Oliver I and Leustach II, and a sister, who married Maurice Pok.

His wife, Aglent Smaragd was mentioned as a living person in 1327, when she resided as a Beguine nun at the Sibylla cloister in Buda. As her brothers, Ladislaus and Aynard were active courtiers even in 1350, it is plausible that Aglent was not the mother of Stephen's four sons: Dominic II, Lawrence, Ladislaus I and Kakas, who all predeceased her. Consequently, Aglent was decades younger than her husband and Stephen had an unidentified first wife before her. Stephen's sons were important lords at the turn of the 13th and 14th centuries; Dominic II was a courtier of Andrew III and was one of the most powerful barons during the era of Interregnum. The Pásztói family ascended from him. Lawrence was killed in the Battle of Lake Hód (near present-day Hódmezővásárhely) in 1282. Ladislaus and Kakas followed their elder brother Dominic's political orientation; Ladislaus was ancestor of the Tari family, while Kakas was killed in the Battle of Rozgony in 1312. Stephen also had a son from his marriage with Aglent: Leustach III died without heirs in the 1340s.

== Career ==
Sometimes before 1264, Stephen belonged to the royal household of Maria Laskarina, King Béla IV of Hungary's consort. In that year, he was referred to as "former" Master of the horse and count (ispán; head) of the tárnoks (financial officials) in the queenly court. For this offices, he was granted a salary of annual 500 marks. During that time tensions emerged between King Béla IV and his eldest son Stephen. Béla's favoritism towards his younger son, Béla (whom he appointed Duke of Slavonia) and daughter, Anna irritated Stephen. Following a short skirmish, Béla and his son divided the country and Stephen received the lands to the east of the Danube. Despite his brothers, Roland and Oliver were considered faithful partisans of Béla IV, Stephen Rátót left the royal court and defected to Duke Stephen in 1264, due to his fear following the dismissal and imprisonment of Csák from the Ugod branch of the gens Csák. Because of his betrayal, the king plundered his landholdings, which laid in Béla's realm, causing severe damage to Stephen Rátót. Stephen Rátót participated in the subsequent civil war between father and son. He was present at the decisive Battle of Isaszeg in March 1265, leading the queenly castle folks.

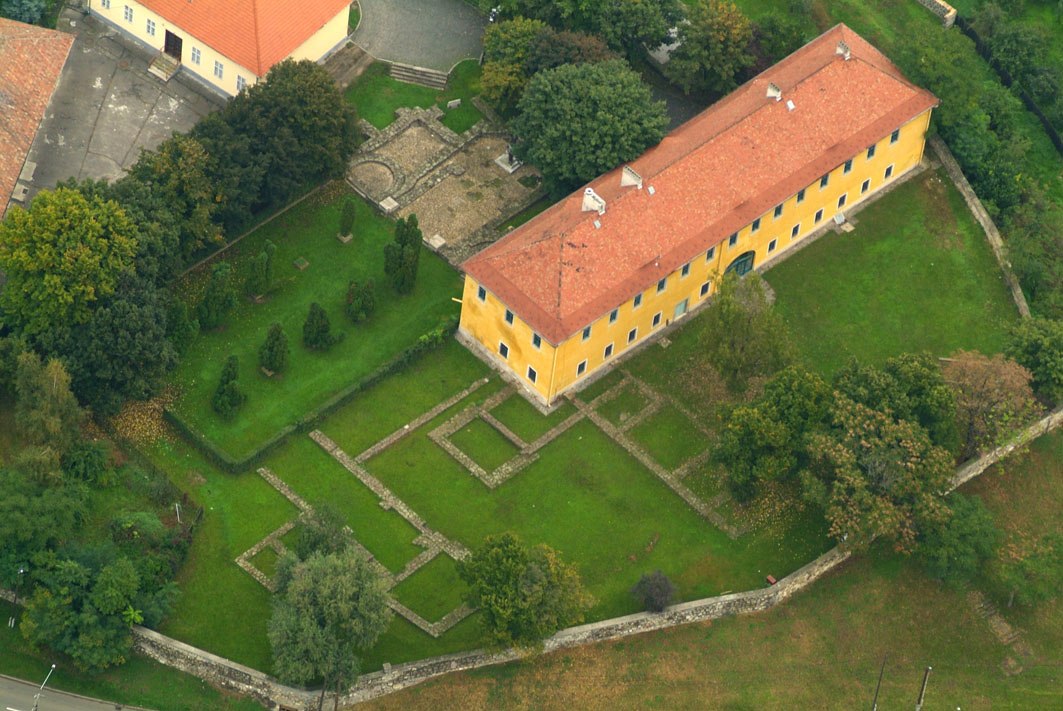
Ruins of the Cistercian abbey in Pásztó

As a compensation for his previous financial loss, the duke donated Ágasvár (lit. "Ágas Castle"), a small fort located in the mountain range of Mátra in Nógrád County, to Stephen in 1265, after the civil war. The castle functioned the seat centre of the Rátót clan for the upcoming decades. Stephen was also granted the right of patronage over the Cistercian Abbey of Pásztó. Ágasvár and its surrounding lands became the basis of the future Rátót province by the end of the 13th century, which laid roughly in Nógrád and Heves counties.

Stephen was made Master of the horse in the court of Duke Stephen's spouse Elizabeth the Cuman in 1265. It is plausible that he held the dignity until 1272, remaining the confidant of the duchess, who became Queen of Hungary in 1270, when Stephen V ascended the throne, and even after she was widowed after Stephen's death in 1272. Beside that he also served as ispán of Trencsén County in the second half of 1272. During the emerging feudal anarchy following Stephen V's death, when rivaling baronial groups fought each other for the supreme power during the minority of Ladislaus IV of Hungary, Stephen Rátót initially belonged to Dowager Queen Elizabeth's favourites. He was appointed Master of the treasury for a brief time in the spring of 1273. The queen was soon expelled from power and her regency remained only nominal. Thereafter Stephen shared his elder brother Roland's political orientation, but definitively lost effective influence in the royal court. He was styled as ispán of Veszprém County in 1275. He was last mentioned as a living person at the end of 1277.

== Sources ==
- Kádár, Tamás (2014). "Egy hűséges báró a XIII–XIV. század fordulóján. Rátót nembeli "Porc" István fia Domonkos nádor [A Loyal Baron at the Turn of 13th and 14th Centuries: Palatine Dominic, son of Stephen the "Porc" from the Kindred Rátót]". Fons. 21 (3). Szentpétery Imre Történettudományi Alapítvány: 267–288. ISSN 1217-8020.
- Markó, László (2006). A magyar állam főméltóságai Szent Istvántól napjainkig: Életrajzi Lexikon [Great Officers of State in Hungary from King Saint Stephen to Our Days: A Biographical Encyclopedia] (in Hungarian). Helikon Kiadó. ISBN 963-208-970-7.
- Szűcs, Jenő (2002). Az utolsó Árpádok [The Last Árpáds] (in Hungarian). Osiris Kiadó. ISBN 963-389-271-6.
- Zsoldos, Attila (2007). Családi ügy: IV. Béla és István ifjabb király viszálya az 1260-as években [A family affair: The Conflict between Béla IV and Junior King Stephen in the 1260s] (in Hungarian). História, MTA Történettudományi Intézete. ISBN 978-963-9627-15-4.
- Zsoldos, Attila (2011). Magyarország világi archontológiája, 1000–1301 [Secular Archontology of Hungary, 1000–1301] (in Hungarian). História, MTA Történettudományi Intézete. ISBN 978-963-9627-38-3.

Stephen I Genus Rátót Born: ? Died: after 1277
Political offices
Preceded by Joachim Gutkeled	Master of the treasury 1273	Succeeded by Joachim Gutkeled
