= Patapoklosi =

- Village
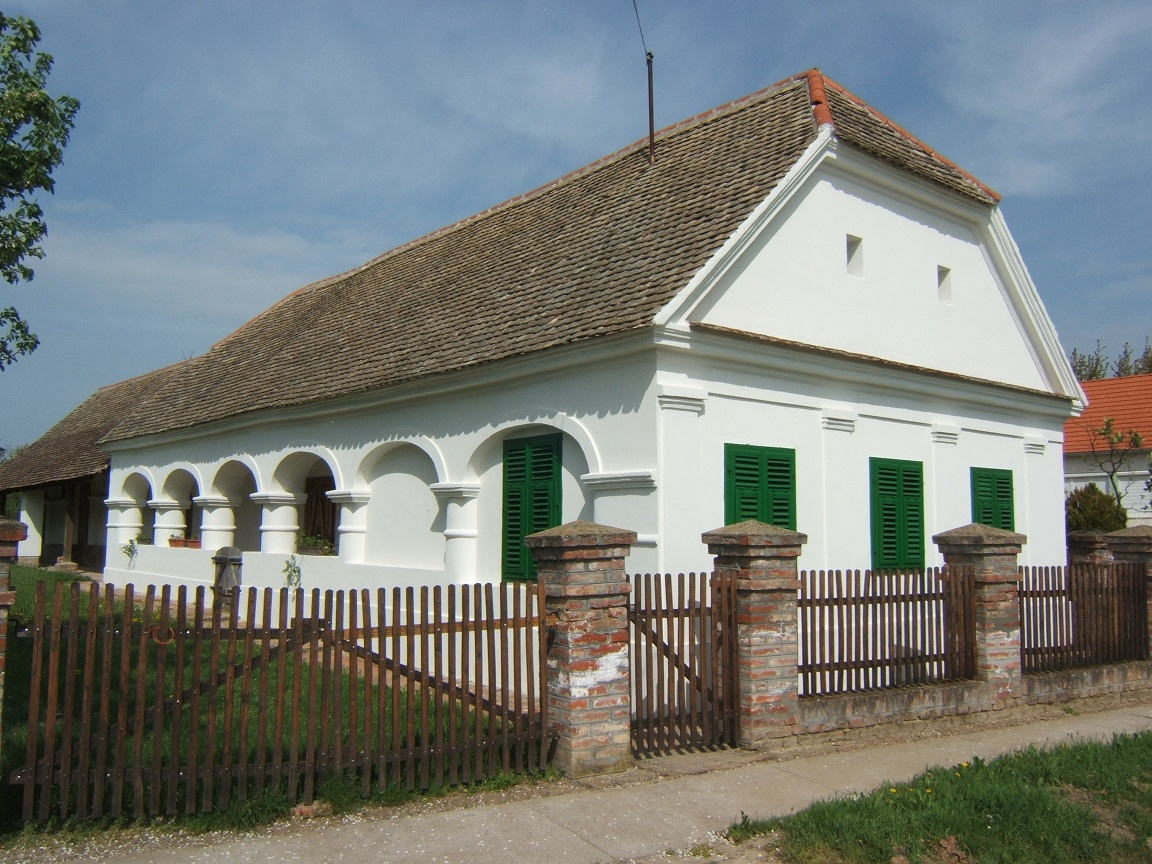
- Folklore museum of Patapoklosi

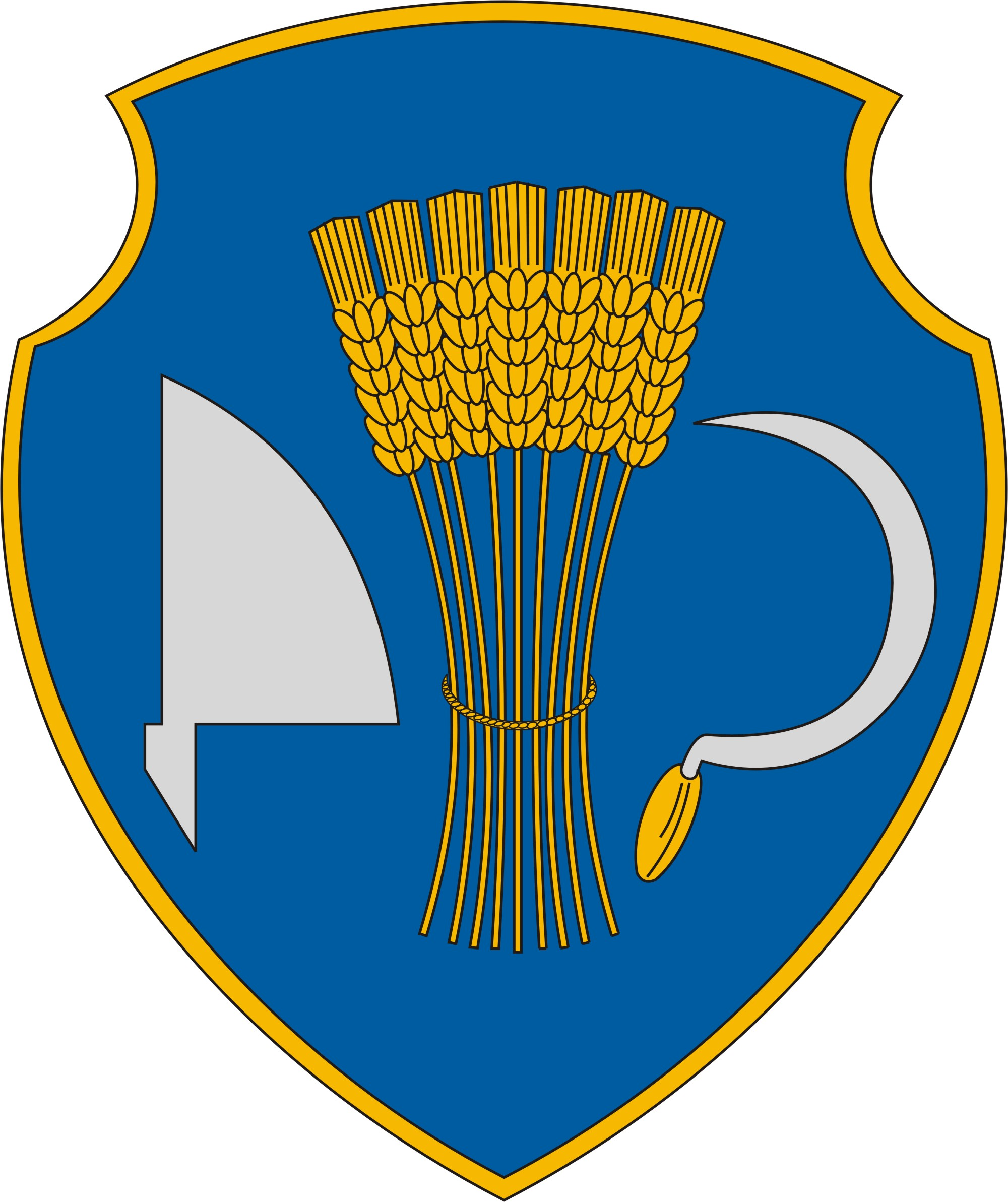
- Flag Coat of arms

- Location within Hungary Location within Baranya County
- Coordinates: 46°04′N 17°45′E
- Country: Hungary
- County: Baranya

Government
  - Mayor: Szilvia Károlyiné Vári (independent)

Population
  - Total: 277
- Time zone: UTC+1 (CET)
  - Summer (DST): UTC+2 (CEST)
- Postal code: 7922
- Area code: 73

Patapoklosi is a village in Szigetvár district, in Baranya county, Hungary.

== Demographics ==
In 2022, the population of Patapoklosi numbered 276 inhabitants.

== Location ==
It is situated at the foot of Zselic, northwest of Szigetvár, a neighboring town. Although the 6607 road between Szigetvár and Kadarkút crosses its eastern administrative area, in terms of inhabited areas, it can be considered a dead-end settlement: the parts of the villages Pata and Poklosi branch off from the aforementioned road to the west. It can be reached via the 66 124 road, which is 1.6 kilometers long.

== History ==
Patapoklosi was established on September 6, 1950, through the merger of the former market town Pata and Poklosi on the opposite side of the Eastern-Gyöngyös.

With the county reorganization in the 1950s, its predecessor settlements, formerly belonging to Somogy County, were attached to Baranya as part of the Szigetvár district. During the Ottoman period, both settlements, along with the nearby Hosszúfalu, became depopulated due to the battles in the region. The village was later resettled with Hungarian population, and it has been continuously inhabited since the 17th century. In 1836, the village was hit by a severe cholera epidemic, causing significant devastation among the population.

In the early 20th century, Pata and Poklosi belonged to the Szigetvár district of Somogy County.

According to the 2001 census, it had a population of 402, while as of January 1, 2008, there were 359 inhabitants. By the time of the 2022 census, the population had further decreased to 276.

=== Pata ===
The name Pata was first mentioned in 1283 in documents written as Pathaa. Its name is likely of personal origin. By 1316, it already had a parish church. The name appeared in the papal tithe register between 1332 and 1337. Around 1360, the property belonged to the Patai Porcz family, then in 1390, it was held by the Kaplai family. In 1391, it belonged to Alsáni János. Forty years later, in 1431, it was disputed by Feledi János and Serkei Lorántfi György. In 1438, Marczali Miklós' sons, Imre and János, acquired it as a donation. By 1448, it already had urban privileges and served as a customs post. In 1453, the Marczali family mortgaged it to the Rozgonyis, including its accessories, for 2000 florins, and in 1455, Marczali János bequeathed part of the settlement to the Pauline monks. In 1464, the Rozgonyi family sued Garai Jób over this settlement, claiming he illegitimately seized it. In 1455, documents mentioned its church dedicated to Saint Andrew. In the 1536 tax register, it was listed as the property of Pekry Lajos. From 1598 to 1599, it was owned by Székely Mihály, and from 1660 onwards by the Kubinyi family. Its Reformed church was built in 1794. In 1836, a major cholera epidemic caused the death of over half of the population.

In 1910, out of 405 residents, 397 were Hungarian, including 141 Roman Catholics and 263 Reformists.

Hosszúfalu was located within its borders, and it was destroyed in 1566 during the siege of Szigetvár Castle.

=== Poklosi ===
Its name likely comes from its adhesive, black soil. Another opinion suggests that, during the Crusades, there were many lepers ("poklos" in Hungarian) among the returning troops, and they were collected and cared for by the monk friends in the territory of Poklosi, giving the place its name.

The name Poklosi was first mentioned in a document in 1431 as part of the town of Pata, when Feledi János and Serkei Lorántfi György were in dispute over it. In 1453, the Marczali family mortgaged it to the Rozgonyis. In 1455, Marczali János bequeathed it to the Pauline monks. In 1470, it belonged to Baranya County. In the 1536 tax register, it was listed as part of the Pata estate, and in 1571, in the Turkish treasury tax register, it appeared as Poklostő with 15 households. According to the 1660 deed of pious endowments of Pannonhalma, it belonged to Kubinyi László, and in 1692, Kun Péter, and around 1701-1703, it was again owned by the Kubinyi family. In 1715, only 8 households were found, and Akay István was the landlord. In 1726, it belonged to the Szalay family, and in 1733, it was again in the possession of the Kubinyis.

In 1910, it had 408 Hungarian residents, among whom there were 49 Roman Catholics and 351 Protestant.

== Community Life ==
=== Mayors ===
- 1990–1994: József Paizs (Agrarian Alliance)
- 1994–1998: József Gábor Paizs (MSZP-Agrarian Alliance-Baranya for)
- 1998–2002: József Paizs (MSZP-Agrarian Alliance)
- 2002–2006: Géza Peti (independent)
- 2006–2010: István Géza Peti (independent)
- 2010–2014: István Géza Peti (independent)
- 2014–2019: Szilvia Károlyiné Vári (independent)
- 2019–present: Szilvia Károlyiné Vári (independent)

== Landmarks ==
The Reformed church in Pata, built in 1794 in the Baroque style, is under historical monument protection. The church features a uniquely beautiful painted coffered ceiling.

Patapoklosi is known as the "village of statues." In this small settlement, seven statues stand: Árpád the Grand Prince, Miklós Zrínyi, Ferenc Rákóczi, Lajos Kossuth, Sándor Petőfi, the first Reformed pastor of the village, Szegedi Kis István, and in the Poklosi part of the village, a statue of the monk caring for the leper (belpoklos) warrior is also present.

== Twin cities ==
- Gernyeszeg, Romania
- Gyöngyöspata, Hungary

== Translation ==
Content in this edit is translated from the existing Hungarian Wikipedia article at hu:Patapoklosi; see its history for attribution.
