= Kisnémedi =

- Coat of arms

- Location of Kisnémedi in Hungary
- Coordinates: 47.73666°N 19.29263°E
- Country: Hungary
- Region: Central Hungary
- County: Pest
- Subregion: Váci
- Rank: Village

Area
  - Total: 13.84 km^{2} (5.34 sq mi)

Population (1 January 2008)
  - Total: 673
  - Density: 48.6/km^{2} (126/sq mi)
- Time zone: UTC+1 (CET)
  - Summer (DST): UTC+2 (CEST)
- Postal code: 2165
- Area code: +36 27
- KSH code: 05227
- Website: www.kisnemedi.hu

Kisnémedi is a village in Pest county, Hungary.
