= Šurice =

Šurice Sőreg
- Municipality
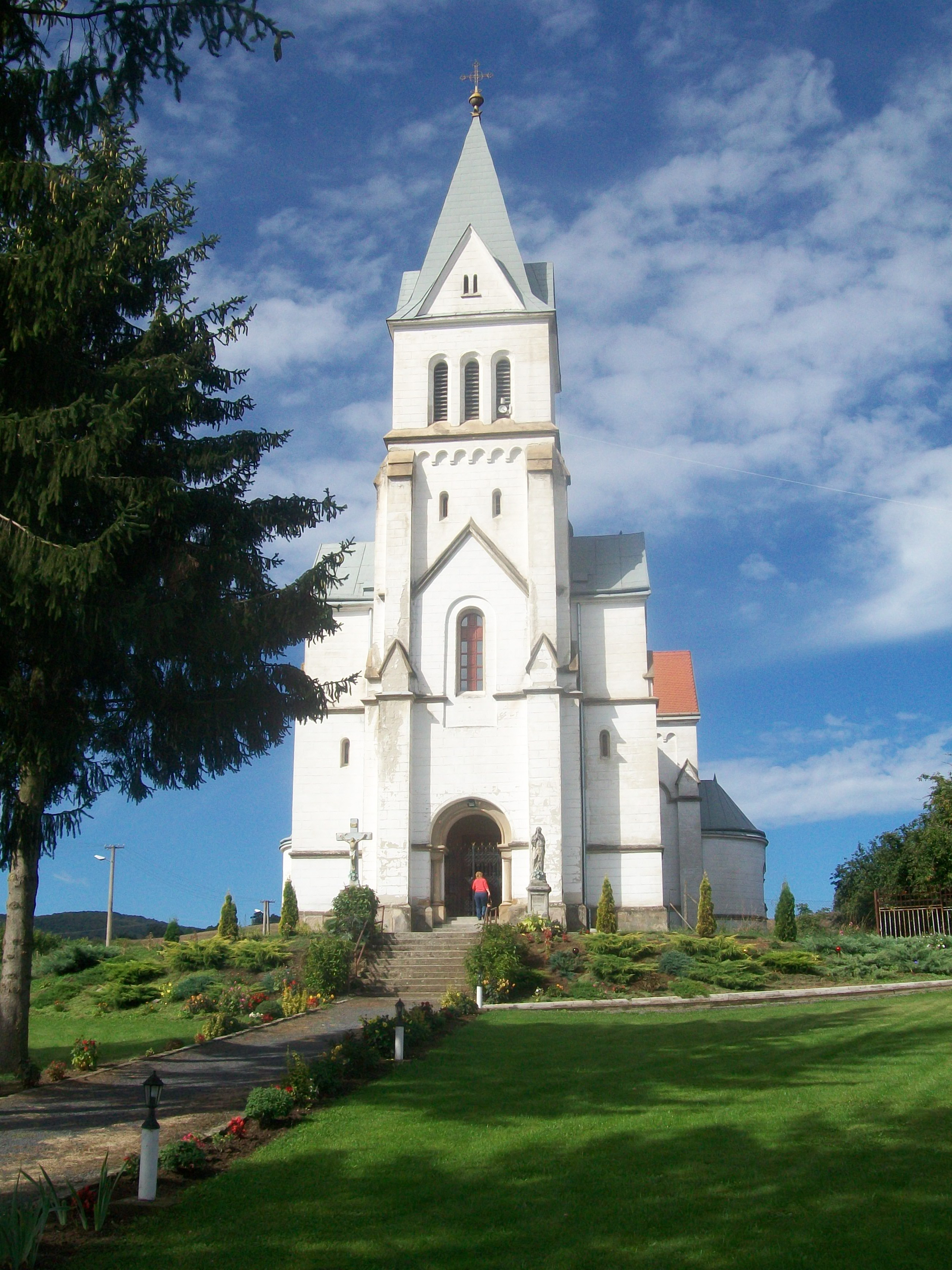
- Neo-Romanesque church of St. Michael in the village

- Flag

- Location of Šurice in the Banská Bystrica Region Location of Šurice in Slovakia
- Coordinates: 48.23°N 19.92°E
- Country: Slovakia
- Region: Banská Bystrica Region
- District: Lučenec District
- First mentioned: 1245

Area
  - Total: 13.99 km^{2} (5.40 sq mi)
- Elevation: 219 m (719 ft)

Population (2025)
  - Total: 437
- Time zone: UTC+1 (CET)
  - Summer (DST): UTC+2 (CEST)
- Postal code: 980 33
- Area code: +421 47
- Vehicle registration plate (until 2022): LC
- Website: obecsurice.sk

Šurice (Hungarian: Sőreg) is a village and municipality in the Lučenec District in the Banská Bystrica Region of Slovakia.

== Geography ==
The municipality lies at an altitude of 219 metres (719 ft) and covers an area of 13.99 km^{2} (5.40 sq mi) (2025).

== Population ==
Population statistic (10 years)
Year	1995	2005	2015	2025
Count	561	503	507	437
Difference		−10.33%	+0.79%	−13.80%

Population statistic
Year	2024	2025
Count	455	437
Difference		−3.95%

It has a population of 437 people (31 December 2025).

=== Ethnicity ===
Census 2021 (1+ %)
Ethnicity	Number	Fraction
Hungarian	376	79.83%
Slovak	110	23.35%
Not found out	11	2.33%
Total	471	

In year 2021 was 471 people by ethnicity 376 as Hungarian, 110 as Slovak, 11 as Not found out, 2 as Other and 1 as Romani.

Note on population: The difference values of population numbers in the table "Population statistic" and in the sections "Ethnicity" & "Religion" is caused by the use of various statistical methods.

=== Religion ===
Census 2021 (1+ %)
Religion	Number	Fraction
Roman Catholic Church	371	78.77%
None	77	16.35%
Evangelical Church	5	1.06%
Total	471	

In year 2021 was 471 people by religion 371 from Roman Catholic Church, 77 from None, 5 from Evangelical Church, 4 from Calvinist Church, 3 from Not found out, 3 from Greek Catholic Church, 2 from Christian Congregations in Slovakia, 2 from United Methodist Church, 2 from Ad hoc movements, 1 from Other and 1 from Buddhism.
