= Oligarch (Kingdom of Hungary) =

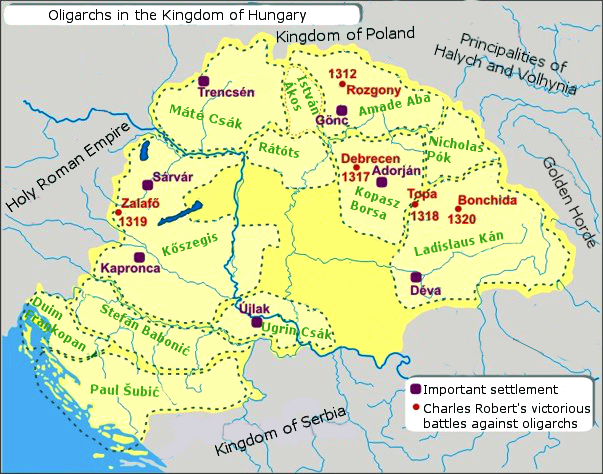
The provinces ruled by the "oligarchs" (powerful lords) in the early 14th century

An oligarch or provincial lord (Hungarian: tartományúr) was a powerful lord who administered huge contiguous territories through usurping royal prerogatives in the Kingdom of Hungary in the late 13th and the early 14th centuries. The term petty king used to be used as well.

== List of oligarchs ==
=== Interregnum (1301–1310) ===
- Amadeus Aba (Northeast Hungary)
- Stephen Ákos (Borsod)
- Stephen Babonić (Lower Slavonia)
- James Borsa (Transtisia)
- Matthew Csák (Northwest Hungary)
- Ugrin Csák (Upper Syrmia)
- Dujam Frankopan (Primorje)
- Ladislaus Kán (Transylvania)
- Henry Kőszegi (Southern Transdanubia and Upper Slavonia)
- Ivan Kőszegi (Western Transdanubia)
- Stephen Dragutin Nemanjić (Lower Syrmia)
- Nicholas Pok (Szamosköz)
- Dominic Rátót (Nógrád)
- Paul Šubić (Croatia and Bosnia)
- Theodore Vejtehi (Severin)

== Sources ==
- Engel, Pál (2001). The Realm of St Stephen: A History of Medieval Hungary, 895–1526. I.B. Tauris Publishers. ISBN 1-86064-061-3.
- Kontler, László (1999). Millennium in Central Europe: A History of Hungary. Atlantisz Publishing House. ISBN 963-9165-37-9.
