= Aba (genus) =

Hungarian ruling dynasty

Aba dynasty
- Country: Kingdom of Hungary
- Founder: Pata
- Titles: King of Hungary
- Estate: Kingdom of Hungary
- Cadet branches: Athinai, Báthory family (of the Aba clan), Báthory de Gagy, Bertóthy, Budaméry, Csirke, Csobánka, Frichi, Gagyi, Hedry, Keczer, Kompolthi, Laczkffy de Nádasd, Lapispataky, Rhédey, Sennyey, Sirokay, Somosy de Somos, Vendéghy and Vitéz

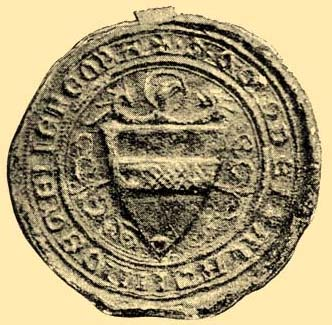
Seal of Amadeus Aba (early 14th century)

Aba is a noble kindred (genus) of the Kingdom of Hungary which according to the Gesta Hungarorum ("The Deeds of the Hungarians" part 32) derives from Pata (Latin: Pota) who was a nephew to Ed and Edemen and the ancestor of Samuel Aba. Some modern scholars have proposed that the family's ancestors may have been among the tribal leaders of the Kabars (three nomadic tribes that joined the tribal federation of the Magyars in the 9th century). The Gesta Hunnorum et Hungarorum ("The Deeds of the Huns and the Hungarians", 1282–85) connects the family to Attila the Hun.

Csaba was Attila's legitimate son by the daughter of the Greek emperor Honorius. Csaba in turn had two sons, Edemen and Ed. Edemen entered Pannonia with his father's and mother's great entourage (his mother being a Chorasminian) when the Hungarians came back for the second time, whereas Ed remained in Scythia with his father. Csaba is the ancestor of the clan of Aba.

— Gesta Hunnorum et Hungarorum

The Gesta Hungarorum mentions that Ed and Edemen received land possession around the forest of the Mátra Mountains, especially in Gyöngyöspata – Heves County, after the conquest of the Carpathian Basin by the Magyars (around 895). Pata built a castle in their forest where centuries later Oliver, Pata's descendant through Samuel Aba was slain by the descendants of Ed and Edemen during the reign of Ladislaus IV.

== Notable members ==
Prince Shaba who wed Princess Sarolta the daughter of Géza, Grand Prince of the Hungarians.

Samuel Aba was the most prominent member of the family who became King of Hungary (1041–1044). The gens may have been named after him.

Countess Claudine Rhédey de Kis-Rhéde who was descent of Samuel Aba.

Oliver of the House of Aba who inherited Pata's Castle in the forest of the Mátra was slain there by the descendants of Ed and Edemen during the reign of Ladislaus IV.

Makján Aba was Palatine of Hungary in the 13th century and a staunch supporter of Ladislaus IV.

Amade Aba is another prominent descendant of the family; he held several castles and possessions on the northern and north-eastern parts of the kingdom in the first decade of the 14th century.

Ladislaus Aba, from the Lipóc branch, was vice-chancellor and provost of Titel.

Lawrence I Aba, he served as Master of the stewards from 1259 to 1270.

Lawrence II Aba, served as Master of the treasury.

Finta Aba, served as Palatine of Hungary from 1280 to 1281.

Count Peter of Aba Lord of Szalánc (ancestor of the Báthory branch of the Clan Aba)

Nicholas I (I. Miklós in Hungarian) served as Voivode of Transylvania from 1342 to 1344

== Branches ==
The gens divided into several families in the course of the centuries.

Today there are nineteen noble families that directly descend from the Royal House of Aba, and belong to Clan Aba – “Genus Aba”. They are: Athinai, Báthory of the Clan Aba, Báthory de Gagy, Bertóthy, Budaméry, Csirke, Csobánka, Frichi, Gagyi, Hedry, Keczer, Kompolthi, Laczkffy de Nádasd, Lapispataky, Rhédey, Sennyey, Sirokay, Somosy de Somos, Vendéghy and Vitéz.

Various members of the Rhédey von Kis-Rhéde branch of Genus Aba held many royal offices and acquired many hereditary titles. Among them – Voivod (Dukes) and Princes of Transylvania, Counts of Rhédey von Kis-Rhéde, Hereditary Count Palatines of the Holy Roman Empire, Papal Count Palatines of the Lateran Palace and Countess von Hohenstein.

== Genetics ==
Genetic samples from 19 individuals were collected at the necropolis in Abasár, from the political centre of the Aba clan. In 2024, archaeogenetic analysis revealed East Eurasian paternal origin to the Aba royal family of Hungary. It revealed that members of the Aba family were related to members of prominent Hungarian medieval noble families, including the Hungarian royal House of Árpád, the Báthory family, and the Hunyadi family, as well as to the first-generation immigrant elite of the Hungarian conquest, all of which had been previously studied through archaeogenetic analysis. In medieval Hungarian chronicles both the Aba and the Árpád dynasty are identified as descendants of Attila, King of the Hunnic empire. Detailed whole genome sequencing data revealed the paternal ancestry of the Árpád dynasty originating from East Eurasia, with potential Hun connections. In the archaeogenetic study, the Abas also demonstrated Asian Hun (Xiongnu) phylogenetic connections.

== Sources ==
- Kristó, Gyula (editor): Korai Magyar Történeti Lexikon – 9–14. század (Encyclopedia of the Early Hungarian History – 9–14th centuries); Akadémiai Kiadó, 1994, Budapest; ISBN 963-05-6722-9.

== See also ==
- Samuel Aba of Hungary
- Palatine Amade Aba
- Makján Aba
- Nicholas Aba – Ban of Dalmatia and Croatia (1272–1273)
- List of rulers of Transylvania
- Klaudia Rhédey de Kis-Rhéde
- Upper nobility (Kingdom of Hungary)
- Abaújvár
- Battle of Rozgony
- Borsod-Abaúj-Zemplén
- Palatine (Kingdom of Hungary)
- Western Roman Empire
- Byzantine Empire
- Byzantine Emperors
- Nicholas I Voivode of Transylvania (founder of the Báthory of Gágy branch)
