= Bicskei =

Bicskei can refer to:

- Something related to Bicske, a town in Féjer County, Hungary

- Bicskei TC, professional football club based in Bicske

- Bertalan Bicskei (1944–2011), Hungarian football goalkeeper and manager
- Gregory Bicskei (died 1303), Hungarian prelate and archbishop
