= Minorite Chronicle of Buda =

The Minorite Chronicle of Buda (Hungarian: Budai minorita krónika) is the historiographical name of a continuation of the ancient Hungarian chronicle. It was written around 1334 during the reign of Charles I. It was the last contribution to the text before the so-called 14th-century chronicle composition and its content can only be reconstructed based on these variants. The text was written by one or more Franciscan friars, covering the period from 1272 to 1333 (chapters 181–211). In addition to historical records from the last third of the 13th century, the author(s) preserved the Hunnic story created by Simon of Kéza and magister Ákos' interpolations within the older texts containing old myths and legends from the Hungarian prehistory. Among the later redactions, the text of the Minorite Chronicle of Buda (the last stage before the large-scale compilation) was most faithfully preserved in the 15th-century Sambucus Codex.

== Background ==
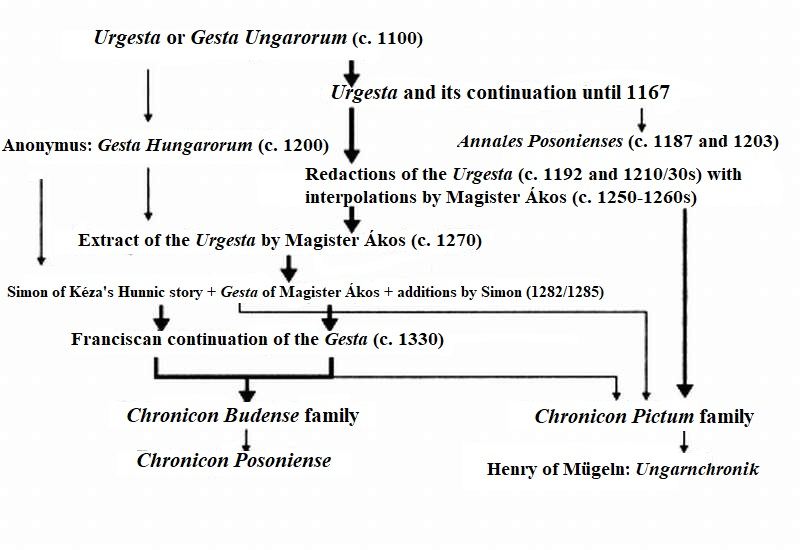
Family tree of the Hungarian chronicles until the 14th century, according to György Györffy (1993)

The first version of the Hungarian chronicle (called Urgesta or Gesta Ungarorum) was completed in the second half of the 11th century or in the early 12th century. Its text was expanded and rewritten several times in the 12th–13th centuries. Ákos, the chronicler during the reign of Stephen V (r. 1270–1272) expanded significantly the chronicle text (its last redaction occurred during the reign of Andrew II (r. 1205–1235)) focusing on the Hungarian prehistory (called Gesta Stephani V), but he only added brief records in the style of annals regarding his contemporary history, listing short biographic elements of the Hungarian monarchs. Simon of Kéza, a court cleric of Ladislaus IV (r. 1272–1290), inserted the history of the Huns before the main chronicle text (his main work, the Gesta Hunnorum et Hungarorum is an extraction of the national chronicle). Historian György Györffy argued that Simon's work and book collection went to the Franciscans of Óbuda after his death.

19th-century scholar Henrik Marczali was the first historian, who assumed an intermediate chronicle between the 13th-century edits and the mid-14th-century compilation. (Note: Initially, Hungarian historians, such as Ferenc Toldy, Emil Békési or László Erdélyi considered that the chapters which narrated the events after 1272 were written by the mid-14th-century compilators of the royal court, such as Mark of Kalt.) He called this work as the Minorite Chronicle of Buda, since its text refers to the order and its monastery in the Hungarian capital in many cases. His thesis was accepted by Bálint Hóman, János Horváth, Jr and György Györffy. Marczali assumed a continuation of the Hungarian chronicle text under Andrew III (r. 1290–1301). He argued the Minorite Chronicle covered the history of Hungary from the reign of Andrew III until around 1330. In contrast, Sándor Domanovszky proved that the chapters on Ladislaus IV can also be attributed to the work of a Franciscan author (i.e. the period from 1272), instead of Simon of Kéza or a continuator from the age of Andrew III, who glorified the reign of Ladislaus, which was unacceptable for the later ages, thus Simon's contribution regarding the 1270–1280s were completely omitted in the chronicle text. Gyula Kristó established that the text of the Minorite Chronicle of Buda lasted until 1333 (211th chapter), when Charles I visited his uncle, Robert, in Naples.

== Authorship ==
=== Single author ===
Henrik Marczali considered that a single author wrote the whole text of the Minorite Chronicle of Buda, which were preserved in the 14th-century chronicle composition (chapters 181–211). János Karácsonyi identified this person with John, who served as provincial general of the Franciscan Order in Hungary from 1323 to 1331.

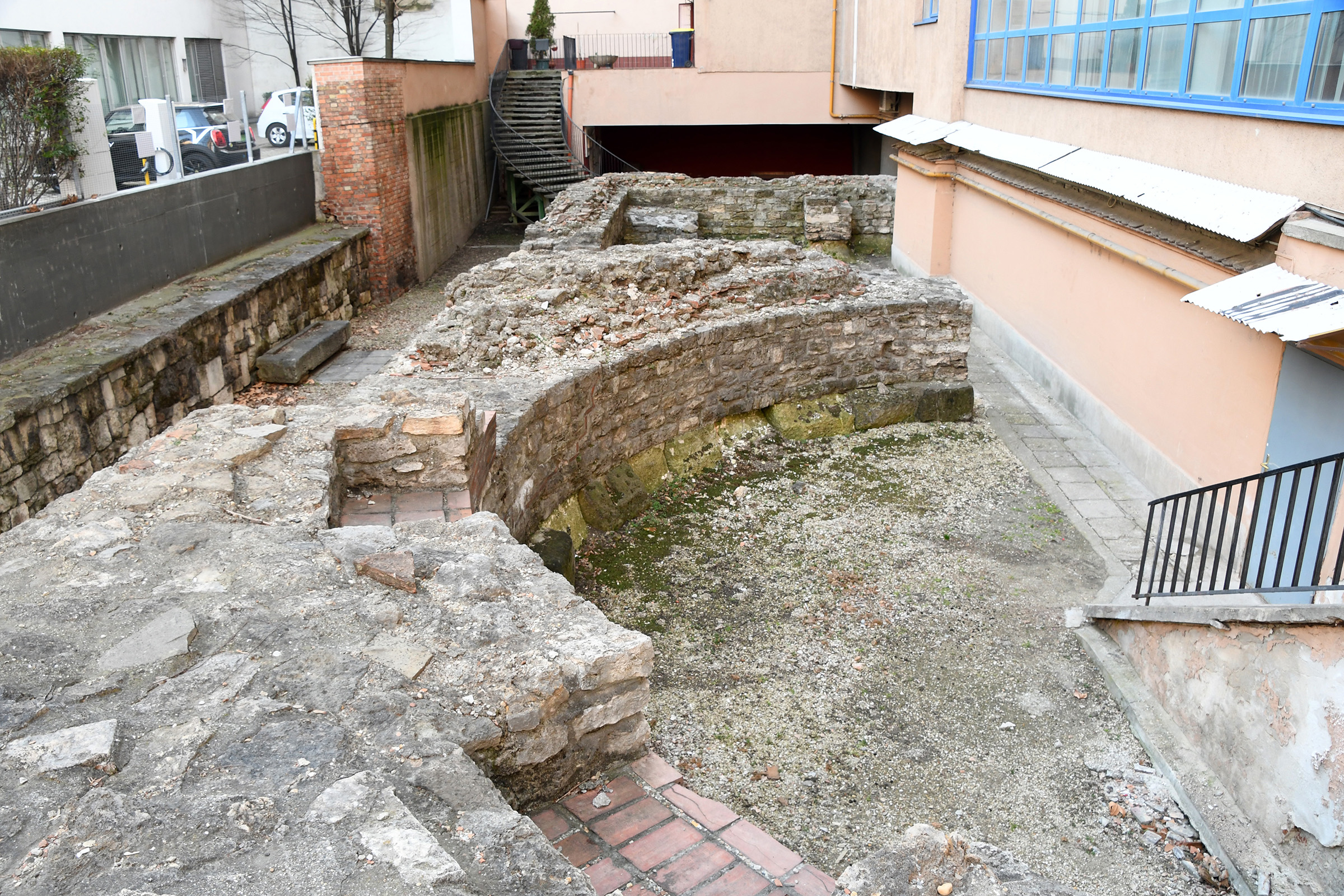
The ruins of the Franciscan church in Óbuda

Accepting this identification, Elemér Mályusz argued the author was loyal to the Capetian House of Anjou, the new royal dynasty in Hungary. For this purpose, John completely left out the passage of the reign of Ladislaus IV written by Simon of Kéza. Instead, he wrote another one, where although he refers to the victorious battles of the king (e.g. Battle of Lake Hód), he details the misery of the country during his reign much more emphatically. John retrospectively evaluated the events according to whether they contributed to Charles' accession to the Hungarian throne. Mályusz argued the Franciscan author narrates the true nature of Felician Záh's assassination attempt by expanding and modifying the story of the assassination of Gertrude of Merania (in 1213). Since the author did not want to hide the facts, he projected the events back to the circumstances of a murder 100 years ago. However, Bánk's revenge version already appears in the Austrian Rhyming Chronicle, compiled around 1270.

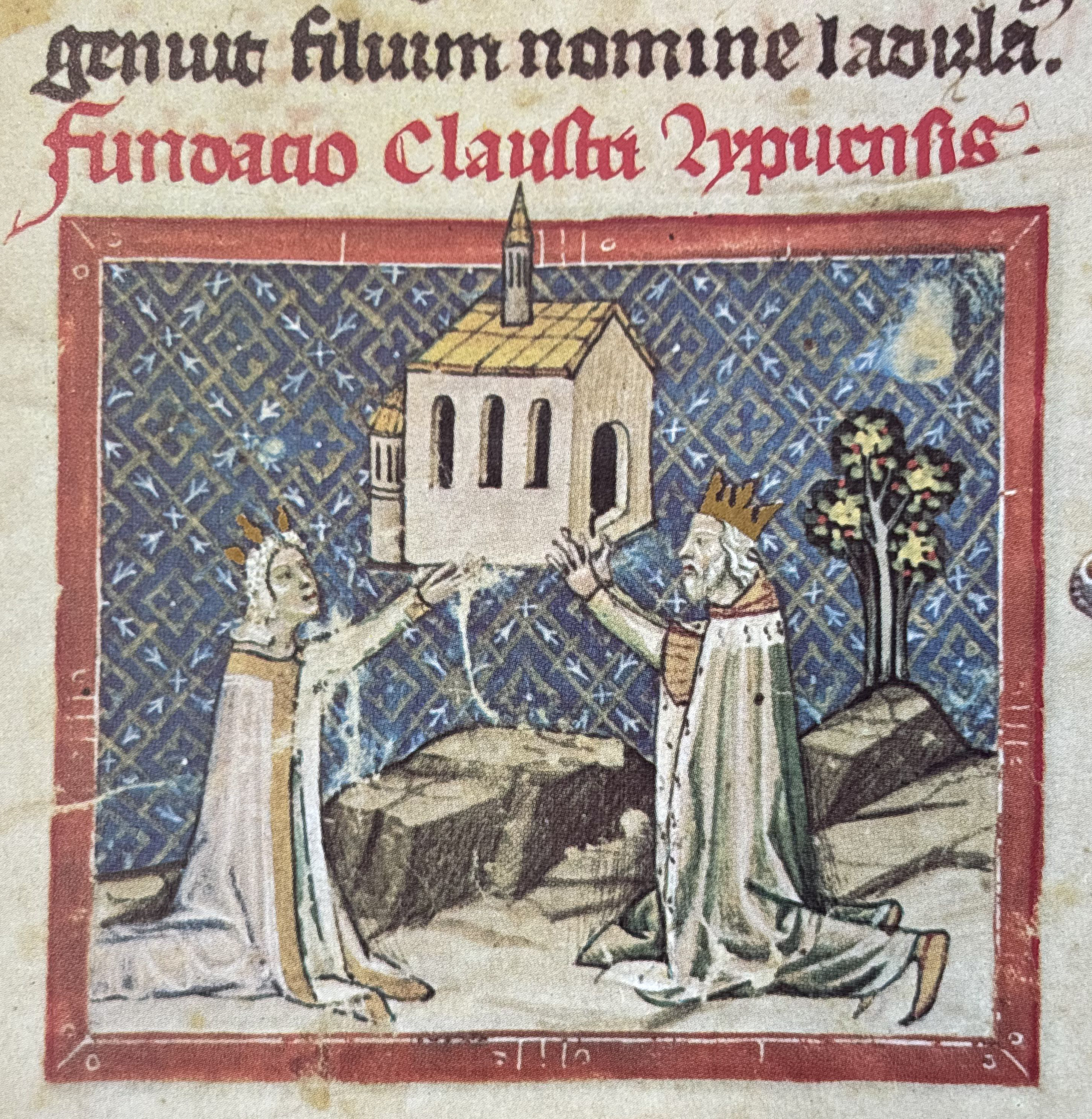
The founding of the Franciscan monastery in Lippa (1325), depicted in the Illuminated Chronicle

Mályusz emphasized John's religious nature of his education compared to earlier chroniclers. He publishes a lot of local news about the Franciscan Order (for instance, Charles founded a Franciscan monastery in Lippa (today Lipova, Romania) dedicated to Louis of Toulouse. The author was also critical of the activity of papal legate Niccolò Boccasini (future Pope Benedict XI, a Dominican), while praised the work of papal legate Gentile Portino da Montefiore (a Franciscan), both were sent to Hungary to represent papal interests and to secure Charles' ascension to the throne during the Interregnum. Despite the chronicler supported Charles' aspirations, he did not serve his propaganda in every aspect, for instance, John considered Charles's first two coronations (1301 and 1309) are invalid, against the practice of the royal chancellery, which proves the author's independence despite his loyalty to the king. The chronicler, declaring the archiepiscopal see as vacant, even refused to acknowledge Gregory Bicskei as the legitimate Archbishop of Esztergom, despite that he was one of the few pro-Angevin prelates after the extinction of the Árpád dynasty (1301). Mályusz argued the end of the text (the Wallachian campaign) is related to John's diplomatic mission to Avignon in 1331, where he intended to downplay the significance of the defeat. According to Mályusz, John, similarly to other Franciscan historians, did not get his information from charters and earlier chronicles, but used the information network within the Franciscan Order to obtain his own information via oral reports and meetings.

Alongside Mályusz, philologist János Horváth, Jr., who analyzed the rhyming and rhythmic prose text of the 14th-century chronicle composition in detail, also argued in favor of a single author. He considered that the chapters 181–211 were written in rhythmic prose. Horváth argued that from the end of the 13th century, due to the spread of the teaching of ars dictaminis, the use of prose rhythm became common especially in chancellery practice, the uniform rhythmic prose does not yet automatically prove that the chronicle part is the work of one author, but – primarily by using the arguments of previous research about the content – he assumed a single chronicler behind the text. Horváth argued that the author was particularly interested in church affairs. He separately mentions the papal legations of Philip of Fermo, Niccolò Boccasini and Gentile Portino da Montefiore. In addition, the author details the story when the clergymen of Buda excommunicated the pope. He also interpolated a chapter (179th) about the movement of Flagellant and the Franciscans' long-lasting fights over the corpse of Béla IV (r. 1235–1270).

=== Multiple authors ===
Austrian scholar Raimund Friedrich Kaindl was the first historian, who considered that the so-called Minorite Chronicle of Buda is a compilation of historical records whose first entries may have been made around 1300, and the last around 1342, and whose writing can be attributed to several authors. Kálmán Dékáni and initially Tibor Klaniczay accepted this argument. Dékáni argued the Fransciscan friars expanded the text of the Gesta Stephani V over decades until around 1342 within the walls of their Buda monastery.

Sándor Domanovszky also argued in favor of two authors. Accordingly, the first monk closed his work at the year 1312, while another chronicler continued the text with the detailed stories of Charles' assassination attempt by Felician Záh and the king's campaign against Basarab I of Wallachia, which resulted a defeat at the Battle of Posada (both events occurred in 1330). Domanovszky considered the first author recorded the events with short summaries retroactively from the reign of Ladislaus IV (1272) until the Battle of Rozgony between Charles I and Matthew Csák (1312). The second author, as Domanovszky claimed, contributes only with short annalistic records after 1317 and primarily deals with the family affairs of Charles I. This text was expanded by another (third) author with details regarding the aforementioned assassination attempt and the failed royal campaign.

==== Kristó Gyula's theory ====
In his 1967 study, Gyula Kristó outlined four authors, whose style and ideology can be separated from each other within the thirty chapters.

Anti-Angevin chronicler (1272–1308; ch. 181–191)

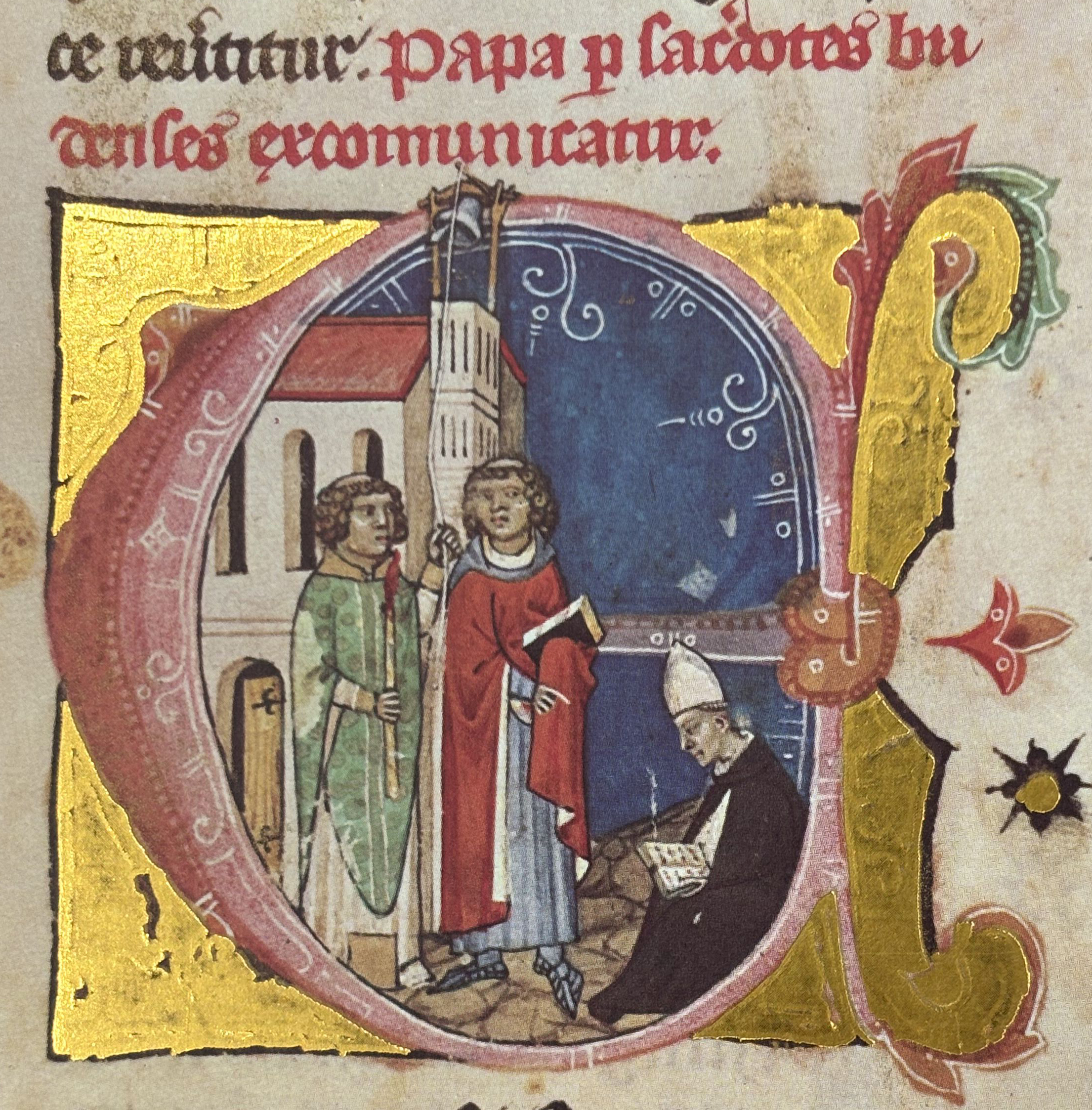
The clergymen in Buda excommunicate Pope Benedict XI, as depicted by the Illuminated Chronicle

According to Kristó, this chronicler was already adult during the reign of Ladislaus IV. His entire narrative regarding his rule is permeated by his personal anger and hatred. He completely ignored the writing of his contemporary Simon of Kéza, who glorified Ladislaus. He describes the misery of the country with plastic pictures. He is also the first author of the 14th-century chronicle composition, who uses the phrase "barones" (i.e. powerful lords). Kristó considered the chronicler perhaps had some connection with the Borsa clan; he highlights the merits of only one person, Roland Borsa, when describing the Battle of Lake Hód. By mentioning the Cuman assassins of Ladislaus IV, he also tries to divert suspicion from James Borsa. Regarding Andrew III, the chronicler does not hide his high-born origin. While several historians considered that the attitude against Ladislaus proves the author's pro-Angevin position, Kristó argued in favor of his anti-Angevin standpoint, because the Angevins emphasized Andrew's illegitimate origin. The author also claims that Pope Boniface VIII sent papal legates to Hungary in order to support the Angevin, already during the lifetime of Andrew III. He completed his work, when Charles was already considered the only remaining serious claimant to the throne (1308). The chronicler emphasizes the legitimacy of Andrew III against the claim of the Capetian House of Anjou (Charles Martel, then his son Charles [Robert]). When he first mentions the latter, he refers disparagingly to the future king as a "certain boy of eleven years, named Charles". He frequently reminds of Charles' age of minority too. He even fails to mention the child's rapid coronation in 1301. The chronicler also lists the failures of the papal legates who were sent to Hungary in order to support Charles' claim. After 1304 or 1305, when Charles increasingly overcame his rivals, the author keeps quiet about his successes.

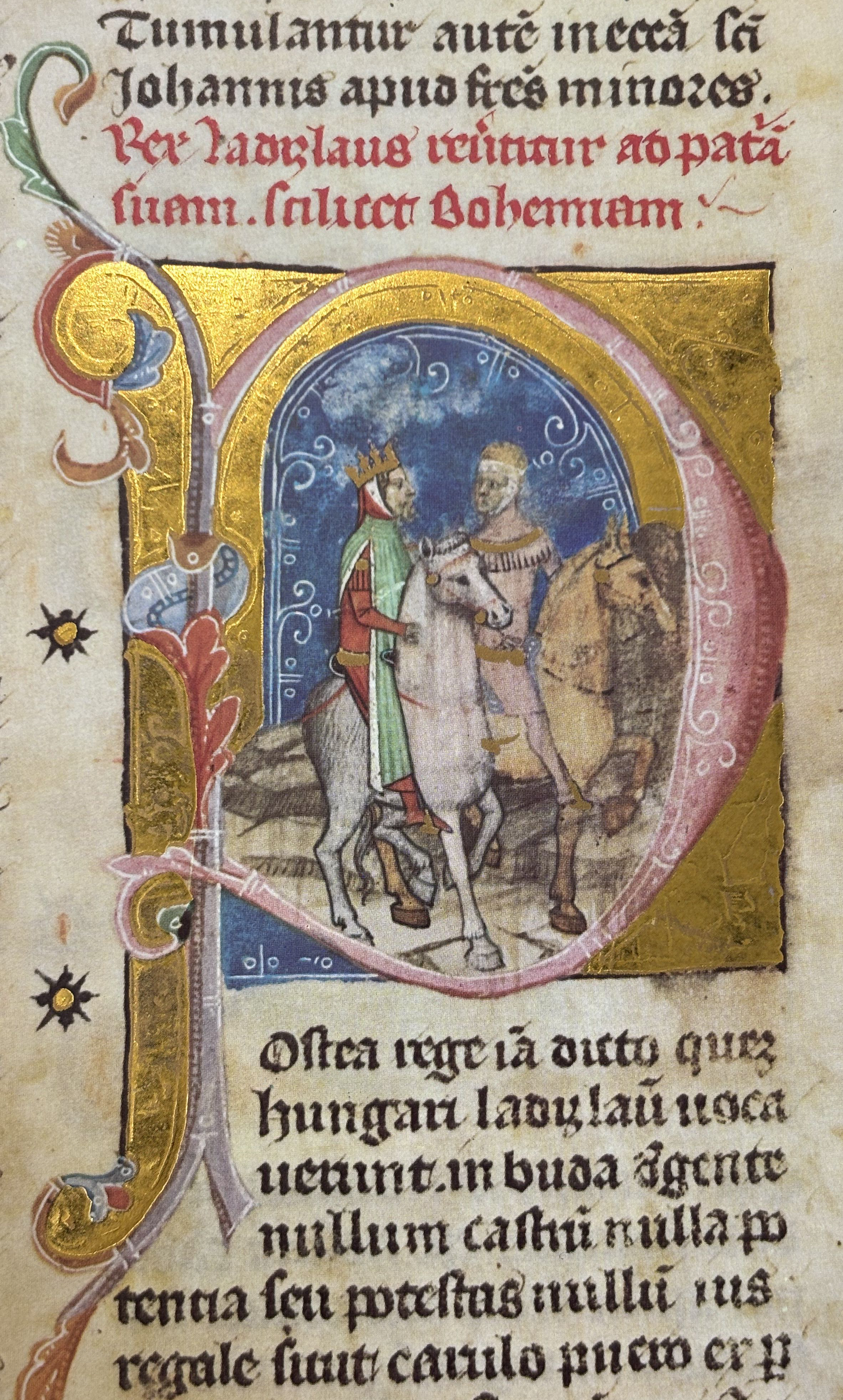
Wenceslaus leaves Hungary (from the Illuminated Chronicle)

In contrast, he refers to those barons and prelates, who invited Wenceslaus to the Hungarian throne in 1301, as "men of great eminence", because "lest the free men of the kingdom should lose their freedom by accepting a king appointed by the Church [i.e. Charles]", which also proves the author's anti-papal sentiment. The chronicler felt sympathy for Wenceslaus. He mentions that John Hont-Pázmány, the Archbishop of Kalocsa crowned the Bohemian prince, because the archiepiscopal see of Esztergom was vacant, refusing the legitimacy of the pro-Angevin archbishop-elect Gregory Bicskei. According to Kristó, when the Minorite friar refers to the Buda heresy, the author deliberately does not mention the reason for the pope's excommunication, despite the fact that he lived locally. As a result of the radicalization of the events, the author already subordinates his political stance to his monastic status, and separates himself from the heretical churchmen.

Kristó emphasized that despite his strong political ideology, the chronicler provides a realistic account in some cases. For instance, he narrates Ladislaus' victory over the Cumans (i.e. pagans) at the Lake Hód in 1282, where he refers to the king he disliked as "brave Joshua". He sees exactly the real political situation during the era of feudal anarchy and Interregnum. He mentions that many of the oligarchs (for instance, Matthew Csák and Amadeus Aba) supported the boy Charles "in word but not in deed". He even acknowledges that both Wenceslaus and Charles were rival monarchs without actual powers. In his last (191th) chapter, the chronicler deals with the next pretender Otto. Unlike Wenceslaus (who returned to Bohemia in 1304), Otto no longer enjoys the Franciscan friar's undivided sympathy. He emphasizes that Otto had to prove with large ceremonies that he was the "rightful king", but later he was imprisoned by Ladislaus Kán, and subsequently "was expelled" from the kingdom. In addition to these chapters, Kristó also argued that this author was responsible for the insertions to the 179th chapter, where narrates the legal disputes over the corpse of Béla IV between the Minorites of Esztergom and Archbishop Philip Türje after 1270. The historian considered this chronicler was the first direct continuator of Ákos' gesta and supervised and selected Simon's contributions. The author, however, inserted Simon's Hunnic story to the chronicle text without significant modifications.

Pro-Angevin chronicler (1305–1312; ch. 192–196)

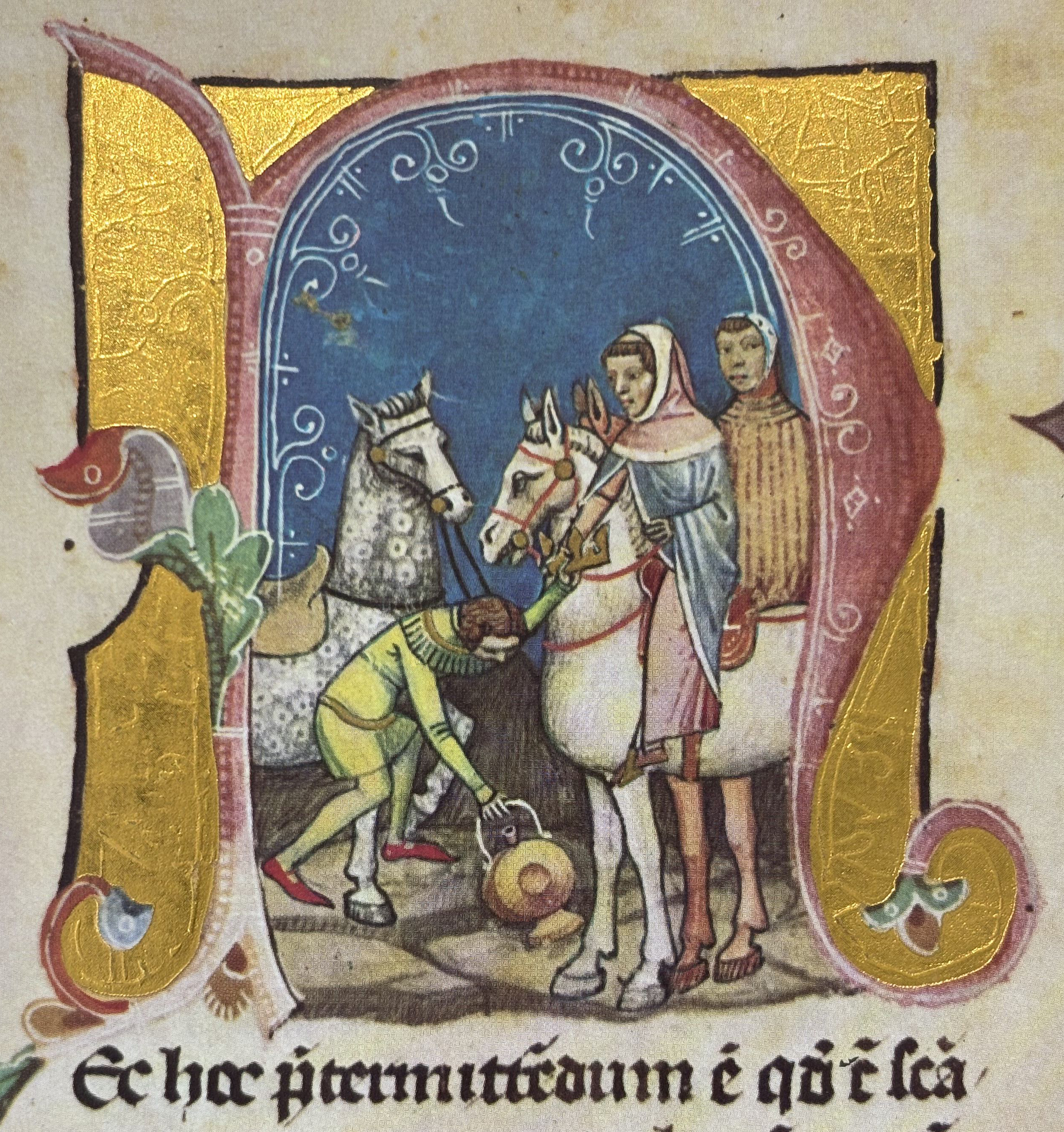
Otto finds the Holy Crown after he lost, depicted in the Illuminated Chronicle

This author begins his records with the sentence "Nor must it be left unrecorded" that the aforementioned Otto almost lost the Holy Crown during his journey to Hungary. With this symbolic event, the author propagates Charles' legitimacy. According to the chronicler, this unfortunate event resulted that "the duke [Otto] was not able to wear this crown throughout his life, [and] lost the crown and likewise his honor". The author refers to Otto as only "duke" (dux) in his chapters, unlike his predecessor (see above). The author also mentions Otto's "enemies" in Hungary (i.e. Charles' supporters). The chronicler records the release of Ladislaus, son of Werner (the rector of Buda), an important partisan of Charles, from Wenceslaus' captivity. Thereafter, the text narrates that Buda, after the fall of the heretic movement, swore loyalty to the Angevin monarch. Kristó argued that Ladislaus' victory was the harbinger of the king's triumph throughout the country.

The chronicler records the activity of papal legate Gentile Portino too; he was a Franciscan, and he "bound in a terrible decree the nobles of the country by the ties of anathema, and he also placed the poor as well as all the rich under a strict interdict" in order to ensure Charles' reign. According to him, the king was elected without opposition, which, however, contradicts the facts. The author ends his short contribution with the Battle of Rozgony (1312). Kristó emphasizes that overestimates and exalts the armies of Matthew Csák and the Aba sons in order to glorify Charles' victory. He describes the oligarchs as the "most stubborn enemies of peace" (including Demetrius Balassa to whom the preceding text refers as one of the "men of great eminence"). According to Kristó, this chronicler represents an undisguised, open partisanship with Charles and the Angevins. He selects moments in the narrative that serve king's interests. Kristó considers his short work serves as an antithesis of the anti-Angevin chronicler's text. It is plausible that this author wrote his text shortly after 1312.

Annalist (1317–1333; ch. 197–205, 210–211)

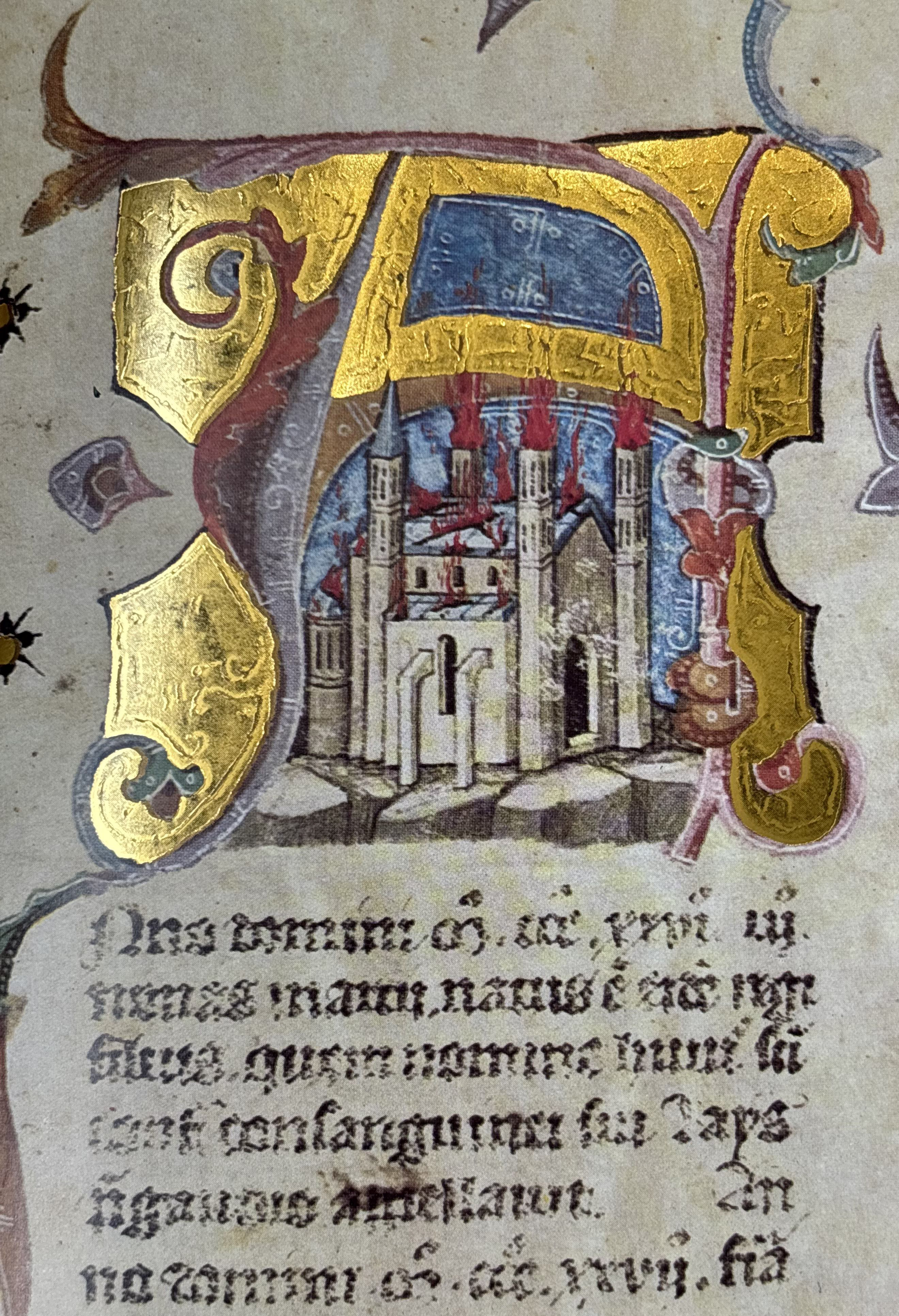
The burning of the Székesfehérvár Basilica in 1327, depicted in the Illuminated Chronicle

The third author lacks all concept, individual ideology and talent, as Kristó emphasized. Sándor Domanovszky styled him as "data recorder" instead of "author" or "chronicler". He recorded events in short notes (in forms of annals) in the period from 1317 to 1333. Most of the laconic lines deal with Charles' family affairs (marriages, child births and deaths). In addition, the scriptor preserved the foundation of the Franciscan monastery at Lippa (1325) and the burning of the Székesfehérvár Basilica (1327). The scriptor makes several dating errors in the years in late 1310s and early 1320s (for instance, the deaths of Queen Beatrice and Matthew Csák), but later these errors are less frequent, thus it is plausible that he recorded the events sometime from the mid-1320s.

Court chronicler (1330; ch. 206–209)

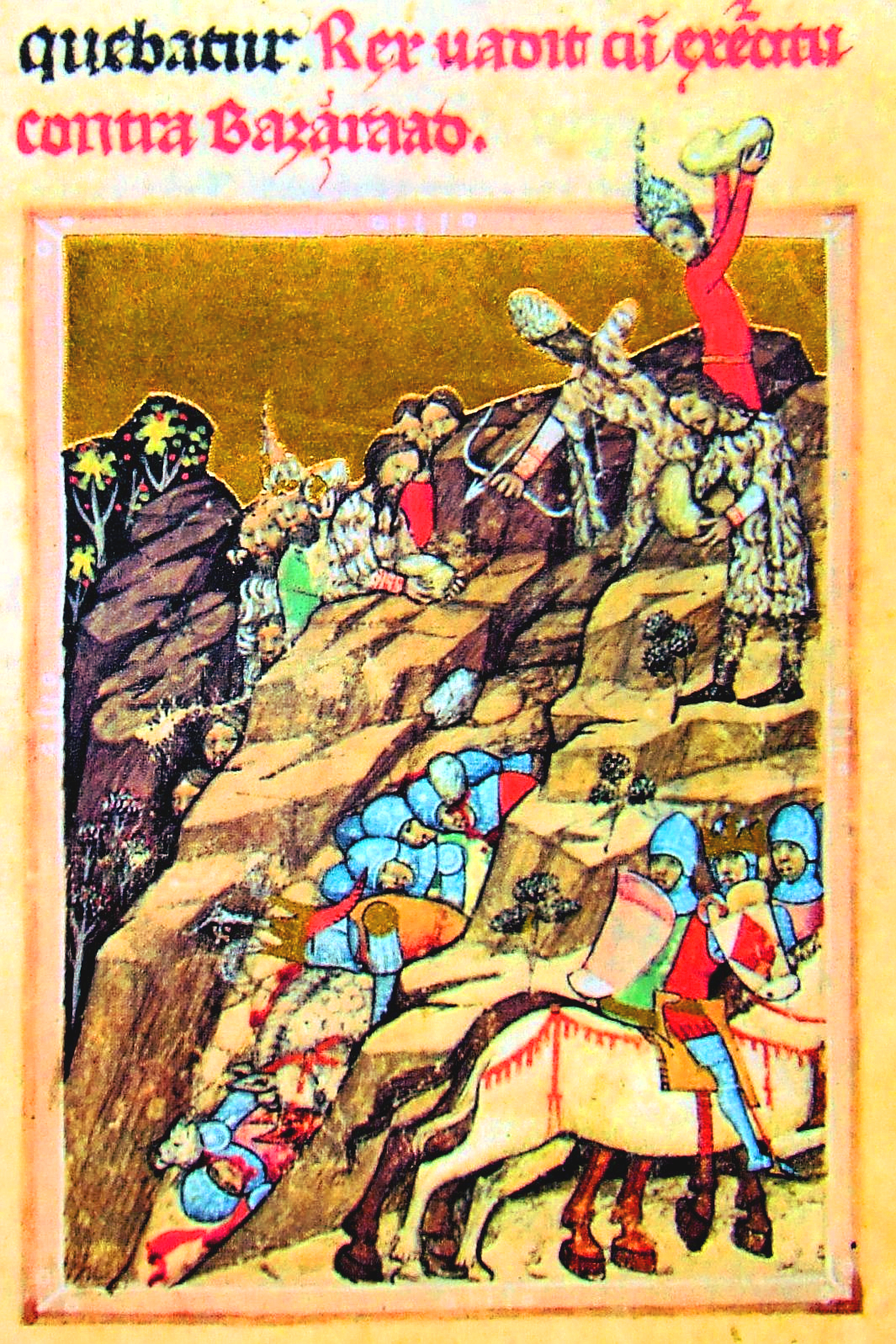
The Battle of Posada (1330), depicted in the Illuminated Chronicle

The fourth author provides detailed narratives of Felician Záh's assassination attempt and Charles' failed campaign against Wallachia, both occurred in 1330. The author inserted his lengthy text within the records of the aforementioned "annalist" chronicler. According to Gyula Kristó, this author was well informed about both events and expanded extensively on the annalist's previously written brief entries on the subjects. He presumably wrote his text shortly after 1333.

Domanovszky argued that his contribution "testify to a highly respected, independent writer who dares to openly express his opinion on the actions of the king". Kristó added that this is the only part of the Minorite Chronicle of Buda, which does not mention the Franciscans in any form, thus his affiliation to the order is uncertain. The terms he uses are reminiscent of the wording of contemporary diplomas, as historian Tibor Kardos noted. It is possible that the author was an employee of the royal chancellery. The author, thus, used contemporary royal charters as sources, which did not characterize the Franciscan historians.

The chronicler begins his text with an idealized image: the people of Hungary "enjoyed the desired tranquility of peace and the kingdom was on all sides secure against its enemies", but this peace was broken by the assassin Felician Záh. The author approves of the cruel retribution of the act, he only feels pity for the assassin's daughter Clara. Nevertheless, ha attempts to justify Charles' exaggerated retaliation, but also condemns the king's cruelty. He believes that the king had to be punished for suffering such heavy losses during the campaign against Basarab still in that year. Although the author is a supporter of the monarch, this, however does not override his own moral system. Domanovszky argued this proves that the author was an influential high-ranking cleric, who dared to take a stand against Charles, voicing his cruelty and haughtiness.

==== Counterarguments ====
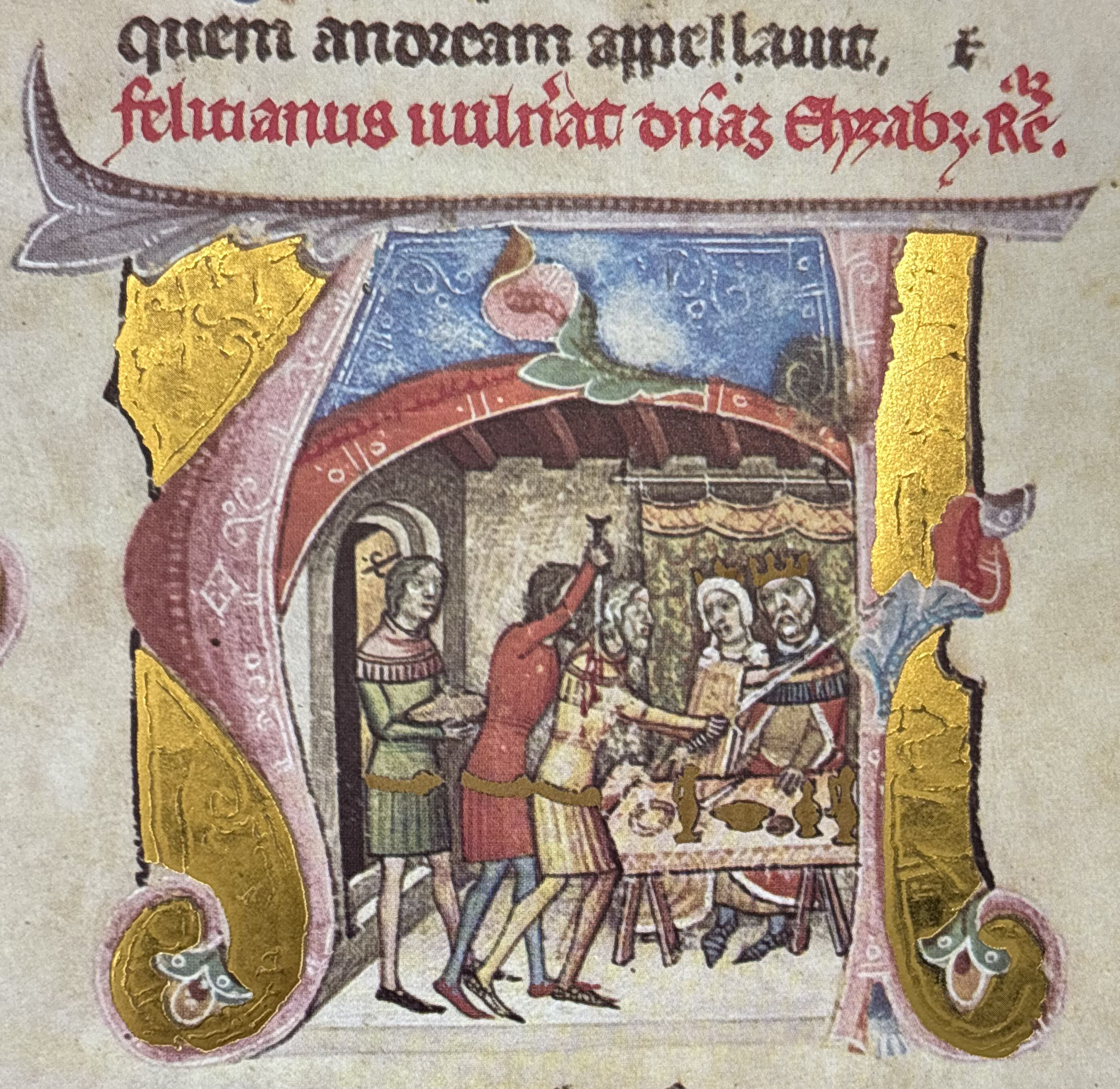
The attempt of Felician Záh on the royal family (1330), depicted in the Illuminated Chronicle

János Horváth, Jr. wrote a debate article in 1971, in which he tried to refute Kristó's arguments one after another. At first, the chronicler in the 186th chapter refers back to a previous chapter (174th), of which he names himself as the creator. This latter chapter contains the assassination of Gertrude and the subsequent (dubious) reprisal against Bánk Bár-Kalán and his kindred. Horváth argued the chronicler projected Felician Záh's assassination attempt and its consequences onto this event, so he must also be the author of those chapters (206–207th). According to Horváth, the entire Minorite Chronicle of Buda is the work of a single author who could have written his work sometime between August 1334 (compilation of the Zagreb Chronicle) and 1336, also relying on contemporary royal charters. The philologist argued that the chronicle text contains textual borrowings from the judgment letter against Felician (1336). Additionally, Horváth also emphasized that the alleged anti-Angevin chronicler refers to the Angevins' family connections with the Árpád dynasty (i.e. their legitimate claim to the Hungarian throne), which would thus be unthinkable if he had written his work against them. Time disturbances are explained by the fact that they were recorded long after they happened.

Examining the 188th chapter, Gábor Thoroczkay disputed that the text was written by an anti-Angevin chronicler. Pope Boniface appointed Gregory Bicskei as administrator of the Archdiocese of Esztergom in 1299. According to the canon law, the archiepiscopal see was indeed vacant, so this cannot be used as an argument for the chronicler's political position. János Horváth also emphasized that the chronicler merely expressed uncertainty about an office not filled by the pope; tried to keep quiet that Charles' first coronation by an unconfirmed archbishop (1301) was also invalid in the sense of ecclesiastical law.

Summarizing her linguistic analysis (see below), Szilvia Somogyi considered that of the four parts, the most distinguishable is the annalist section. However, the primary reason for this is its nature and language, which makes it impossible to analyze it grammatically and to compare it with the other parts. However, based on some examples, it can still be connected to the style of the other parts. The other three content-separated parts are connected by a multitude of linguistic phenomena. Undoubtedly, the first two parts form the more coherent unit with each other (identical sentence structures, word usages, grammatical phenomena, and even content matches), the part starting with Felician Záh's assassination attempt is more distinct in terms of stylistic design. The reason for this can be explained by the content of the passage. However, its linguistic and word usage connection with other parts of the text is undeniable. According to Somogyi, based on her philological examination, it cannot be proven that the text of the chronicle part (181–211th chapters) is the work of several authors.

== Linguistic style ==
According to Gyula Kristó, the text is far from reaching the standard that Simon of Kéza showed earlier with the Hungarian adaptation of the contemporary European system of ideas. No support for a single domestic social group can be observed – foreign-origin aristocracy or the nobles' communitas, as in the case of Ákos or Simon, respectively. Elemér Mályusz emphasized that history writing in Hungary became anecdotal and story-teller again, falling back to an earlier stage of development. Mályusz argued that "the principle of telling the events one after the other prevailed again, and a naïve transcendentalism replaced the incipient realism characteristic of early Italian historiography". The driving principles of social development and the different political and theoretical ideologies do not appear in the text at all. This is clearly a characteristic of Franciscan historiography in the period, which relied more on "popular" information, instead of royal and ecclesiastical centres.

=== Rhymed prose ===
János Horváth, Jr. proved that the entire text is written in rhythmic prose typical of the early 14th century. In addition, the 174th (Gertrude's assassination) and 179th (Béla's corpse) chapters are also rhythmic insertions into an earlier text material. Literary historian Tibor Klaniczay described the chronicler as a "conscious artist of style", who wrote in regular rhythmic prose and often used apt similes and figurative expressions. These characteristics are most often seen in the narrative of the campaign against Basarab, thus Klaniczay considered that perhaps epic poems could also have been available to the author in this case. Gyula Kristó considered four authors within the text to be distinguishable according to the rhythmic prose (end-of-sentence rhymes, rhymes at the end of the column, rhyming structures) as well. Based on this, Kristó described the Minorite Chronicle of Buda as "a conglomerate of heterogeneous texts".

=== Linguistic analysis ===
Based on the examination of the text's morphology, Szilvia Somogyi noted that the text shows orthographic features of Medieval Latin, alongside classical forms of conjugation. Possibly the author(s) possessed the textbook of Priscian. The use of pronouns is relatively uniform, also with Middle Latin linguistic features.

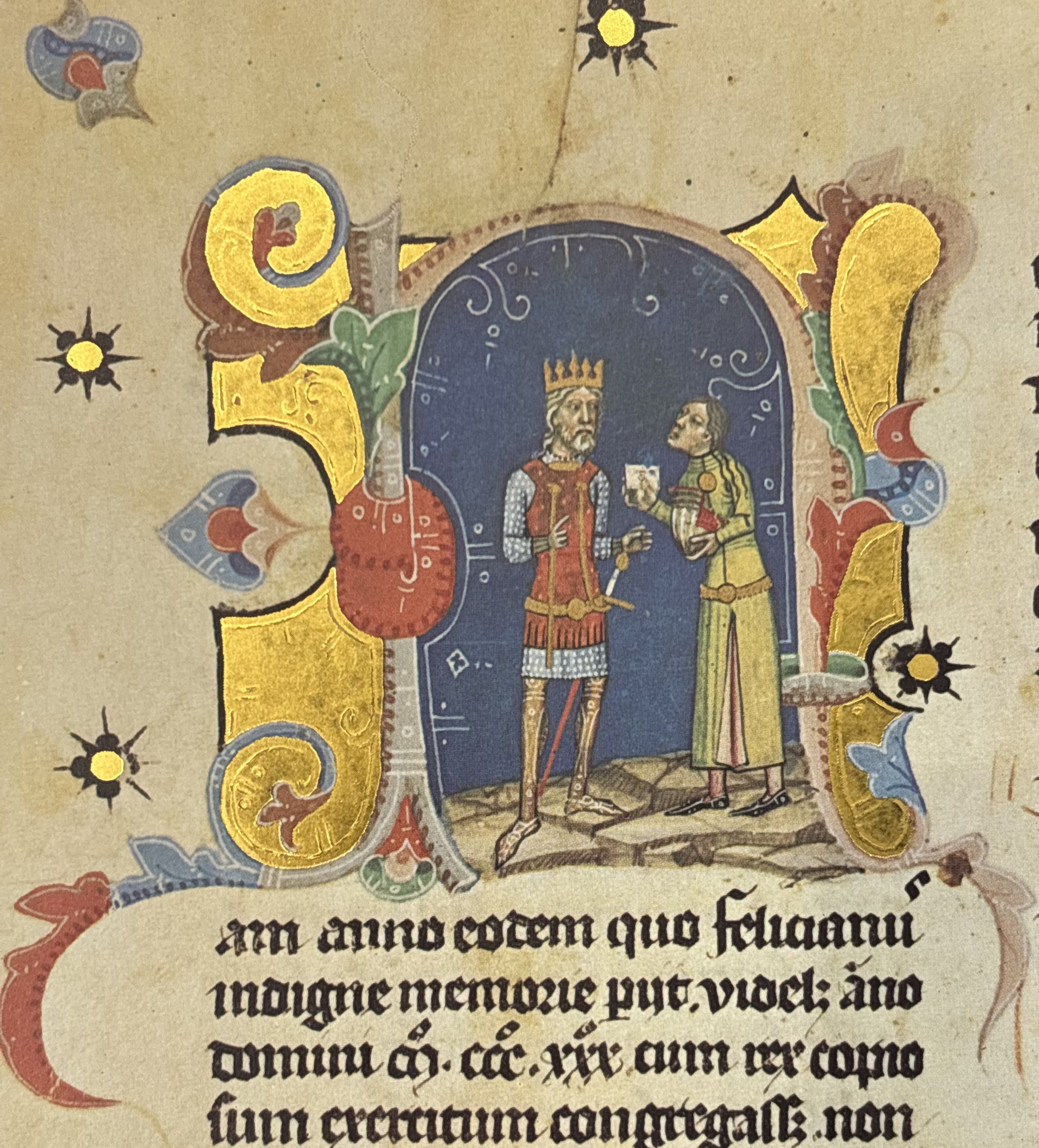
Charles I receives the envoy of Basarab, as depicted in the Illuminated Chronicle

As is usually the case with narrative historical works, the usage of praesēns perfectum is most frequent, but in the 206–209th chapters (Felician Záh's assassination attempt and the Wallachian campaign), praeteritum imperfectum and praesens imperfectum dominate the text. The latter is used in mostly passive form (181–191st chapters). In the next four chapters (192–196th), the author leaves the third-person narrative mode two times and presents his own point of view with moralizing evaluations (finding of the Holy Crown and result of the Battle of Rozgony). The use of verbs in the annalistic part (197–205, 210–211) shows a high degree of similarity with the aforementioned 181–191 part. The praesens imperfectum functions as a story invigorating and perceptive tool for the chronicler in the 206–209th chapters. The peculiarity of this passage is that the narrator of the story puts the words into the mouths of his characters. Charles I and Basarab, who communicate to each other via messengers, speak in the imperativus and even in the futurum imperfectum.

Somogyi analyzed the stylistic forms of the text too. The usage of figures of speech (rhetoric) like anaphora occurs throughout the text, but epistrophes appear less frequently (even the annalist avoids repetition of words). In many cases, the end of the chapters ends with evaluative, summative sentences and personal opinions, regardless on the separation of the four stages outlined earlier. Somogyi argued this can prove the unity of the text, which thus weakens Kristó's argument regarding the four authors. The tools of antimetathesis (puns) are also used by the author(s) throughout the whole chronicle (for instance, "Felicianus infelix" and "confidens de fide perfidi"), in addition to polysyndetons and pleonasms. Formulas from royal charters can be found scattered throughout the thirty chapters, so not only within the 206–209th chapters. A stylistic gem is one of the author's sentences, in which he alternates between disjunction and distribution. The text contains similes in many cases: a biblical parallel when Ladislaus IV is compared to Joshua. In the 206–209th chapters, "folk" similes appear prominently. Felician Záh is given a disadvantageous legendary animal likeness in three cases ("beast", "monster" and "hound"). The Vlachs are also described as "hounds" ("canina").

In addition to the disproportionality of the similes, the differences in the use of conjunctions also indicate that the passage is not uniform in this regard. Other metaphors based on immutation in the examined text occur almost only in the text of the 206–209th chapters. The 208th chapter is a single allegory spanning an entire passage, which Somogyi apostrophizes as the stylistic climax of the Hungarian Latin texts of the first half of the 14th century: "Until the time this happened, King Charles had sailed with favorable winds; as he desired, so the ship of his fortune furrowed the rippled expanse of the sea. But now mutable fortune averted her face and turned her back in farewell; for in the wars that arose on all sides his forces were defeated, and also his feet and hands became twisted and exceedingly painful". These phrases appear in one of the letters of Jerome. The usage of alliterations is also widespread throughout the text. The chronicle part does not address the reader directly on any single occasion, however, if the figure is interpreted more broadly, then the previously discussed chapter-ending snaps, the author's exits from the narrative, can all be considered apostrophes. In addition, there are two occasions when the chronicler gives the floor to someone else, both times in the text of the 206–209th chapters. On one occasion Clara Záh gets a sentence, and in the other case Basarab and Charles I say their sentences to each other themselves.

Biblical expressions occur in many cases. In the 181st chapter, Ladislaus IV is compared to Joshua (Book of Joshua, 10:7–11); the general is victorious with the help of divine intervention. In the next chapter (182nd), Ladislaus becomes hated because of his "foreign" (Cuman) concubines, just as the wise Solomon is diverted from the worship of the true God by his lovers of foreign descent in his old age (Books of Kings II, 11:3–4). According to the 183rd chapter, the monarch "despised the conjugal bed", a phrase which appears in the hagiography of Saint Emeric of Hungary. As mentioned above, the chronicler paraphrased a passage from a letter of Jerome to the entire 208th chapter. "The dying flies lose the sweetness of the perfume" (209th chapter) is a phrase from Ecclesiastes 10:1.

== Legacy ==
"We find that the historians of the old times wrote the origin of the Huns, that is, the Hungarians, in a contradictory way, and both the people of today and of the old times have different opinions about them, and there is significant contradiction in this matter. In fact, we have two volumes of chronicles that provide information about their origin and history, and which – as can be assumed – were obtained during the time of the once prosperous Hungarian kings Charles and Louis; but they also differ from the other historians, and even from each other, mainly in the illumination of the origin of the peoples. One of the two bases its lineage on the tenth chapter of Genesis, the other on the eleventh chapter."

— Johannes de Thurocz: Chronicle of the Hungarians

The Minorite Chronicle of Buda was the final redaction of the Hungarian chronicle text before the two 14th-century compositions. With the writing of it, the first large-scale compilation of the Hungarian chronicle (around 1333–1334) was established, during the reign of Charles I. Its text was preserved in five surviving codices or manuscripts, however none of them are the original chronicle, but copies of it made directly or indirectly (through multiple transfers). These five chronicles are called altogether the family of the Buda Chronicle after its most famous piece. The end-15th-century Sambucus Codex preserved the text most faithfully, it is possible that the author copied the original Minorite Chronicle of Buda directly. Other chronicles of the Buda Chronicle family are the Acephalus Codex (mid-14th century), the Vatican Codex (15th century), the namesake Buda Chronicle (1473) and the Dubnic Chronicle (1479). The Hungarian chronicle text was redacted again during the reign of Louis I (r. 1342–1382), primarily with expansion and insertion of former records to the chronicle text, in addition to creating a new preface with different Biblical elements. This compilation and its chronicles are called the family of the Illuminated Chronicle after its most famous manuscript. The Minorite Chronicle of Buda was also extracted around 1350, this work is called Chronicon Posoniense. The quote from Johannes de Thurocz proves that both redactions were well known in the royal court by the 1480s.

== See also ==
- List of Hungarian chronicles

== Sources ==
- Bak, János M.; Grzesik, Ryszard (2018). "The Text of the Illuminated Chronicle". In Bak, János M.; Veszprémy, László (eds.). Studies on the Illuminated Chronicle. CEU Press. pp. 5–23. ISBN 978-963-386-261-2.
- Horváth, Jr., János (1954). Árpád-kori latinnyelvű irodalmunk stílusproblémái [Stylistic Problems of the Árpád-Era Latin Literature] (in Hungarian). Budapest: Hungarian Academy of Sciences.
- Horváth, Jr., János (1971). "Die ungarischen Chronisten der Angiovinenzeit [The Hungarian Chroniclers during the Age of the Angevins]". Acta Linguistica Academiae Scientiarum Hungaricae (in German). 21. Magyar Történelmi Társulat: 321–377. ISSN 0001-5946.
- Kristó, Gyula (1967). "Anjou-kori krónikáink [Chronicles from the Angevin Period]". Századok (in Hungarian). 101 (3–4). Magyar Történelmi Társulat: 457–504. ISSN 0039-8098.
- Kristó, Gyula (2002). Magyar historiográfia I. Történetírás a középkori Magyarországon [Hungarian Historiography I. History Writing in Medieval Hungary] (in Hungarian). Osiris. ISBN 978-963-389-261-9.
- Lengyel, János (2007). "Krónikaszerkesztések I. Károly Róbert és Nagy Lajos korában [Chronicle Edits during the Reigns of Charles I Robert and Louis the Great]". Együtt. 9 (2). Magyar Írószövetség Kárpátaljai Írócsoportja: 73–79.
- Mályusz, Elemér (1966). "Krónika-problémák [Chronicle Issues]". Századok (in Hungarian). 100 (4–5). Magyar Történelmi Társulat: 713–762. ISSN 0039-8098.
- Mályusz, Elemér (1967). A Thuróczy-krónika és forrásai [The Thuróczy Chronicle and its Sources] (in Hungarian). Budapest: Tudománytörténeti tanulmányok 5, Hungarian Academy of Sciences.
- Somogyi, Szilvia (2011). "A XIV. századi krónikakompozíció Anjou-kori folytatásának nyelvezete. (A budai minorita krónika latin nyelve) [The language of the Angevin continuation of the fourteenth-century chronicle composition: the Latinity of the Buda Minorite Chronicle]". Fons. 18 (2). Szentpétery Imre Történettudományi Alapítvány: 209–268. ISSN 1217-8020.
- Thoroczkay, Gábor (2009). Írások az Árpád-korról: Történeti és historiográfiai tanulmányok [On the Age of the Árpáds: Historical and Historiographic Studies] (in Hungarian). L'Harmattan. ISBN 978-963-236-165-9.
