= Ladislaus Aba =

Hungarian cleric

- Provost of Titel
- Installed: 1280 or before
- Term ended: 1299/1301
- Predecessor: Andrew (?)
- Successor: Denis
- Other post: Vice-chancellor

Personal details
- Died: 1299/1301
- Denomination: Roman Catholic
- Parents: Alexander Aba; N Kán

Ladislaus from the kindred Aba (Hungarian: Aba nembeli László; died 1299/1301) was a Hungarian cleric in the second half of the 13th century, who served as Provost of Titel from around 1280 to 1299. He was vice-chancellor in the court of Andrew III of Hungary in 1299.

== Life and career ==
Ladislaus was born into the Lipóc branch of the powerful gens (clan) Aba as one of the four sons of Alexander (I) Aba. His mother was the daughter of Ladislaus I Kán. He had three brothers, Alexander (II), a castellan of Körösszeg (present-day Cheresig, Romania); Demetrius Nekcsei, the influential Master of the treasury in the court of Charles I of Hungary, and Nicholas.

Ladislaus first appears in contemporary records in 1280, when he already functioned as provost of the collegiate chapter of Titel (today in Serbia). His last known predecessor is Andrew, whose name mentioned in this capacity in 1251. The Titel Chapter transcribed its former 1237 charter upon the request of a certain Gregory, son of Stephen in 1280; beside Ladislaus, the document mentions lector Andrew, cantor Andrew, custos Valentine and decanus John. Ladislaus took part in the division of the Lipóc lordship within his kindred in 1282. He and his brothers were granted the northeastern part of the lordship (Kecerkosztolány, Hanusfalva and the surrounding lands, present-day Kecerovce and Hanušovce nad Topľou, Slovakia). The Lipóc branch also divided their estates beyond the Drava in the 1290s, during the reign of Andrew III. Ladislaus and his three brothers acquired Nekcse and Podgorács (present-day Našice and Podgorač in Croatia) during this land of division.

Sometime in July 1299, Ladislaus was made vice-chancellor of the royal court, replacing Anthony (although an authentic charter refers to him in this position already in January). Ladislaus gained the office as the protege of John Hont-Pázmány, Archbishop of Kalocsa, who headed the royal council. In that year, Andrew III confirmed the land division contract of the Lipóc branch in his royal charter, upon the request of Ladislaus and his kinship. Ladislaus acted as vice-chancellor until December 1299. He was succeeded by Stephen by the spring of 1300 at the latest. In 1301, already a certain Denis is styled as provost of Titel, implying Ladislaus' death by that time.

== Sources ==
- C. Tóth, Norbert (2019). A kalocsa-bácsi főegyházmegye káptalanjainak középkori archontológiája [Medieval Archontology of the Chapters of the Archdiocese of Kalocsa–Bács] (in Hungarian). Kalocsai Főegyházmegyei Levéltár. ISBN 978-615-5940-01-9.
- Karácsonyi, János (1901). A magyar nemzetségek a XIV. század közepéig. I. kötet [The Hungarian genera until the middle of the 14th century, Vol. 1] (in Hungarian). Hungarian Academy of Sciences.
- Thoroczkay, Gábor (2014). "A Szent Bölcsesség egyháza, A titeli társaskáptalan története a kezdetektől a XIV. század közepéig [[The Church of the Holy Wisdom. The History of the Chapter of Titel from the Beginning until the Middle of the 14th Century]". Fons (in Hungarian). 21 (3). Szentpétery Imre Történettudományi Alapítvány: 331–350. ISSN 1217-8020.
- Zsoldos, Attila (2011). Magyarország világi archontológiája, 1000–1301 [Secular Archontology of Hungary, 1000–1301] (in Hungarian). História, MTA Történettudományi Intézete. ISBN 978-963-9627-38-3.

Ladislaus Genus Aba Born: ? Died: 1299/1301
Catholic Church titles
Preceded by Andrew (?)	Provost of Titel; 1280–1299	Succeeded by Denis
Political offices
Preceded by Anthony	Vice-chancellor; 1299	Succeeded by Stephen
