= Buda heresy =

1304–07 Waldensian heresy in Hungary

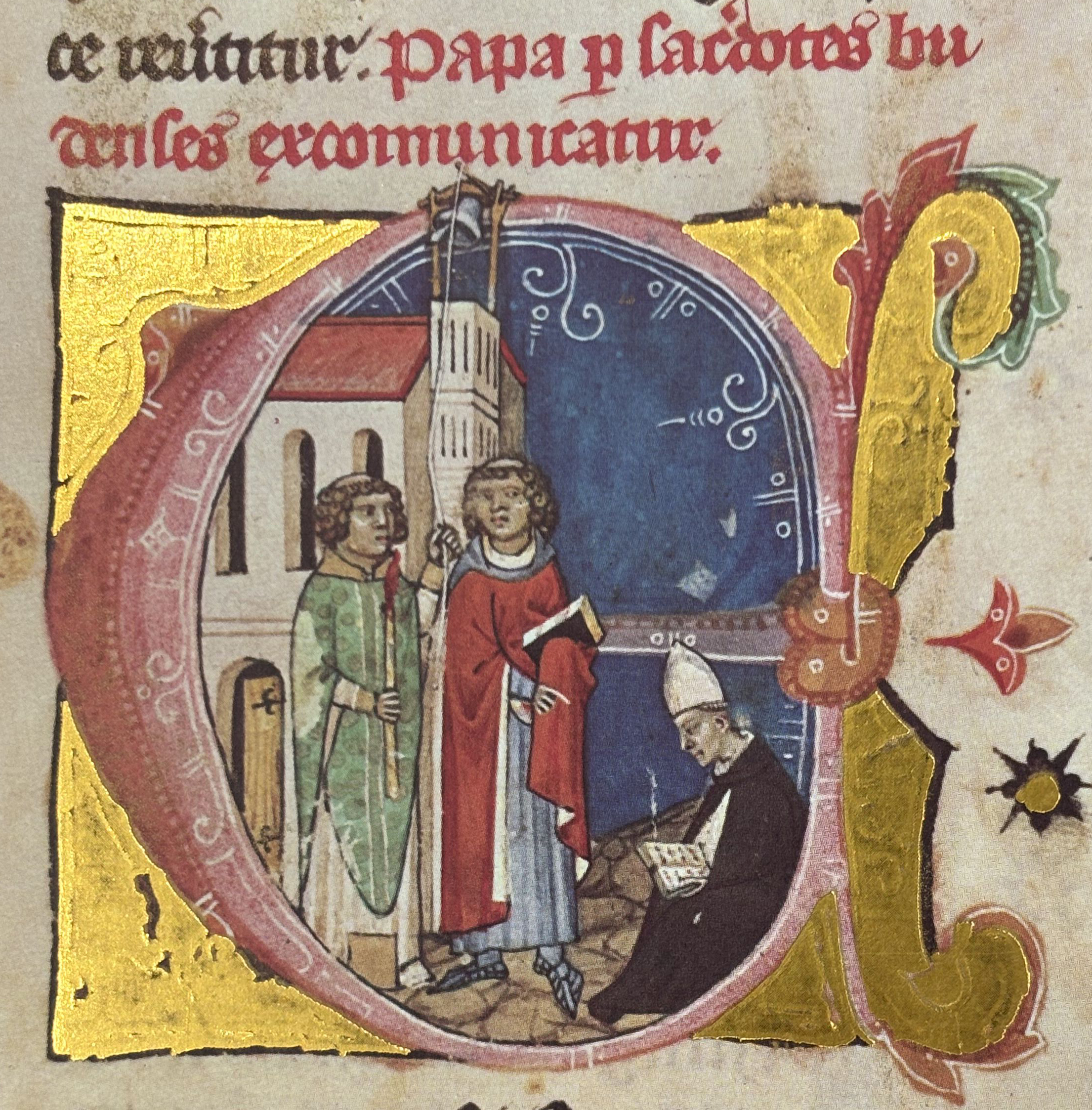
The clergymen in Buda excommunicate Pope Benedict XI, as depicted by the Illuminated Chronicle

The Buda heresy (Hungarian: budai eretnekség) was a Waldensian heretical movement from 1304 to 1307 in Buda, the capital of the Kingdom of Hungary (present-day a borough of Budapest). In a political context, the heresy was a tiny segment of a wider conflict during the era of Interregnum following the death of King Andrew III of Hungary, when various claimants fought for the Hungarian throne.

== Background ==
Following the First Mongol invasion of Hungary, King Béla IV ordered the construction of reinforced stone walls around the town of Buda and set his own royal palace on the top of the protecting hills of Buda, creating a new royal capital in the decades between 1247 and 1265. For defensive purposes, he moved the citizens of Pest to a hill on the opposite side of the Danube in 1248. Within two decades their new fortified town, Buda, became the most important center of commerce in Hungary. The emerging burghers, who sought autonomy, had several conflicts with various church institutions in the second half of the 13th century. Around the same time, several German merchants settled in the town. They had several privileges, including duty exemption and free choice of priests. Béla IV granted the collection right of local fair duty and the right of patronage over the Church of Our Lady, which was under construction, to the Dominican nuns at Rabbits' Island in 1255, which seriously harmed the economic interests of the merchants. During the various lawsuits, the prestigious nunnery have enjoyed the support of all political factors, in addition to the Roman Curia, which confirmed its privileges. In 1287, the burghers requested Ladislaus IV to annually hold new nationwide duty-free fairs in the town, but Ladislaus refused this after a few months of hesitation. The protection of the Dominican nuns inhibited the material growth of the burghers. For instance, although rector Werner was granted a land donation by the king in the next year, he was not registered as the owner, because the nuns claimed the lands for themselves. Ladislaus' successor, Andrew III also supported the Dominican nuns against the burghers of Buda in various occasions.

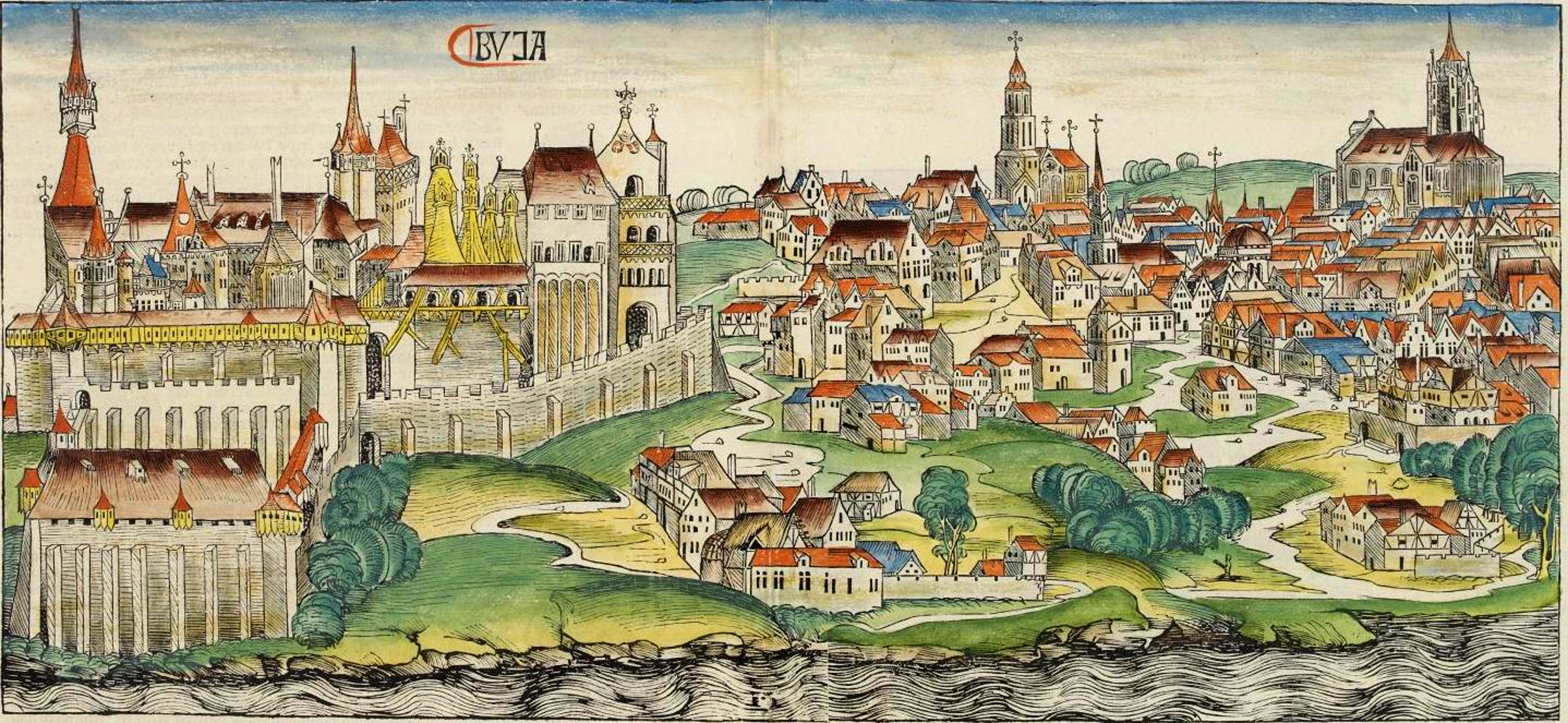
Buda in the Middle Ages

The burghers also embroiled in conflict over financial disputes with the Archdiocese of Esztergom since the 1280s. The archbishopric imposed high value customs along the western trade route. Although the merchants tried to evade this duty, Ladislaus IV obliged them to pay the duties at Győr to the cathedral chapter of Esztergom in 1288. Whereas this was still delayed, Archbishop Lodomer placed the town of Buda under interdict and excommunicated its city council in 1289. Werner and two jurors visited the episcopal court of Esztergom to negotiate with the archbishop on 8 September 1289. There, Lodomer was willing to suspend the ecclesiastical punishment, if Buda did not accept merchants who had not paid the duty entitled to the archdiocese. Werner accepted the condition. In addition, the city council of Buda was also involved in jurisdictional conflict over the port tariff at Pest with the collegiate chapter of Óbuda in the 1290s. There were reports of insults of the chapter's customs officials by local citizens. Both the chapter of Óbuda and the Dominican nunnery at Rabbits' Island appealed to the Roman Curia against the violent methods of the Buda city council. Archbishop Lodomer threatened with another excommunication: therefore Werner and the city council retreated. In order to promote reconciliation, Andrew III put the local Beguines under the protection of rector Werner in the summer of 1296. The secular leaders of the future heretical movement first appeared in the confrontation between the town and the Diocese of Veszprém. On 15 June 1295, the town council verified that burghers Kunc (also Prenner) and Hermann leased the tithe income from the wine production of the bishop for 140 marks. On 16 July 1297, the abbot of Bélakút Abbey complained to the Archdiocese of Esztergom that Hermann usurped 25 barrels of wine on behalf of Bishop Benedict Rád, which belonged to the abbey's property. After an appeal of the Dominican nuns to Rome in March 1298, Pope Boniface VIII entrusted Benedict Rád to investigate the city council's "aggressive anti-clerical steps", thus he also interrupted the cooperation with Buda.

Andrew III died on 14 January 1301, leaving no male heirs. A civil war between various claimants to the throne (the so-called "Interregnum") followed that and lasted for seven years. On hearing his death, Charles of Anjou hurried to Esztergom where he was crowned king. Being Pope Boniface's candidate for the Hungarian throne, Charles had always been unpopular, because the Hungarian lords feared that they would "lose their freedom by accepting a king appointed by the Church", according to the Illuminated Chronicle. They decided to offer the crown to the young Wenceslaus, the son of Wenceslaus II of Bohemia. Werner was a member of that delegation, which visited the Bohemian court to negotiate with the king, according to the Königsaal Chronicle. After his arrival to Hungary, Wenceslaus was crowned king in August 1301 and resided in Buda. Pope Boniface sent his legate, Niccolò Boccasini, to Hungary. He convinced the majority of the Hungarian prelates to accept Charles' reign. He was present in Buda in the autumn of 1301, where held a national synod. In December 1301, he instructed Albert, the parson of the Church of Our Lady to procure the burghers – by name, Kunc (Prenner), Petermann, Tym, Dietrich, Martin, Hermann and Mohran – to recover the wine production tax to the Diocese of Veszprém. The papal legate dealt with the pleading of the chapter of Óbuda in the spring of 1302, who complained that the rector and the city council hinder the work of their tax collectors for past two years. Taking advantage of the weakened position of his rival, Charles of Anjou attempted to capture Buda, the capital of Wenceslaus, in September 1302. After laying siege to Buda, Charles of Anjou called upon the burghers to extradite Wenceslaus, but rector Ladislaus, son of Werner and the city council remained faithful to the young king and Ivan Kőszegi relieved the city in the same month.

== The movement ==
At this time, Brother Nicolaus of the order of the Preachers, bishop of Ostia and cardinal, came to Hungary, vested with the authority of the Holy See, on behalf of Charles. After staying in Buda for some days, he saw that he would be unable to accomplish anything, and so he returned to the papal court. On the death of Boniface VIII he was chosen to be pope, and at his investment he took the name of Benedict [XI]. At his departure from Buda he had for some cause left the citizens under an interdict, which was faithfully observed both by monks and priests. But now there arose false and disobedient priests who openly celebrated divine service before the people and administered the sacraments of the Church to those who had been banned from them. They heaped evil upon evil in their growing sinfulness: the people having been called together and lanterns lighted, they proclaimed with loud voice that the Pope, the vicar of Christ, the archbishops and bishops of the kingdom of Hungary and the members of the religious orders were all excommunicated. At the time that this was done, the castle of Buda was under the charge of a certain Peterman, whom King Wenceslaus had appointed in the place of Ladislaus, whom he had taken captive.

— The Hungarian Illuminated Chronicle

On 31 May 1303, Pope Boniface VIII declared Charles of Anjou the lawful king of Hungary, stating that Wenceslaus' election had been invalid. Simultaneously, the pope had recalled his papal legate Niccolò Boccasini, who placed the pro-Wenceslaus capital, Buda under interdict and excommunicated its city council. To strengthen his son's position, Wenceslaus II of Bohemia came to Hungary at the head of a large army in May 1304. He captured Esztergom, but his negotiations with the local lords convinced him that his son's position in Hungary had dramatically weakened. Accordingly, he decided to take Wenceslaus back to Bohemia and even took the Holy Crown of Hungary with himself to Prague in August 1304. Wenceslaus also captured and imprisoned rector Ladislaus, son of Werner, who supported Charles' claim by then, and abducted him into Bohemia. The aforementioned Petermann (Kunc's son) became the new rector of the town and leader of the German-origin patriarchy. Under his guidance, local priests excommunicated Niccolò Boccasini, who was elected as Pope Benedict XI by then after his return to the Roman Curia, in addition to the Hungarian archbishops and bishops, who almost unanimously supported the claim of Charles of Anjou to the Hungarian throne.

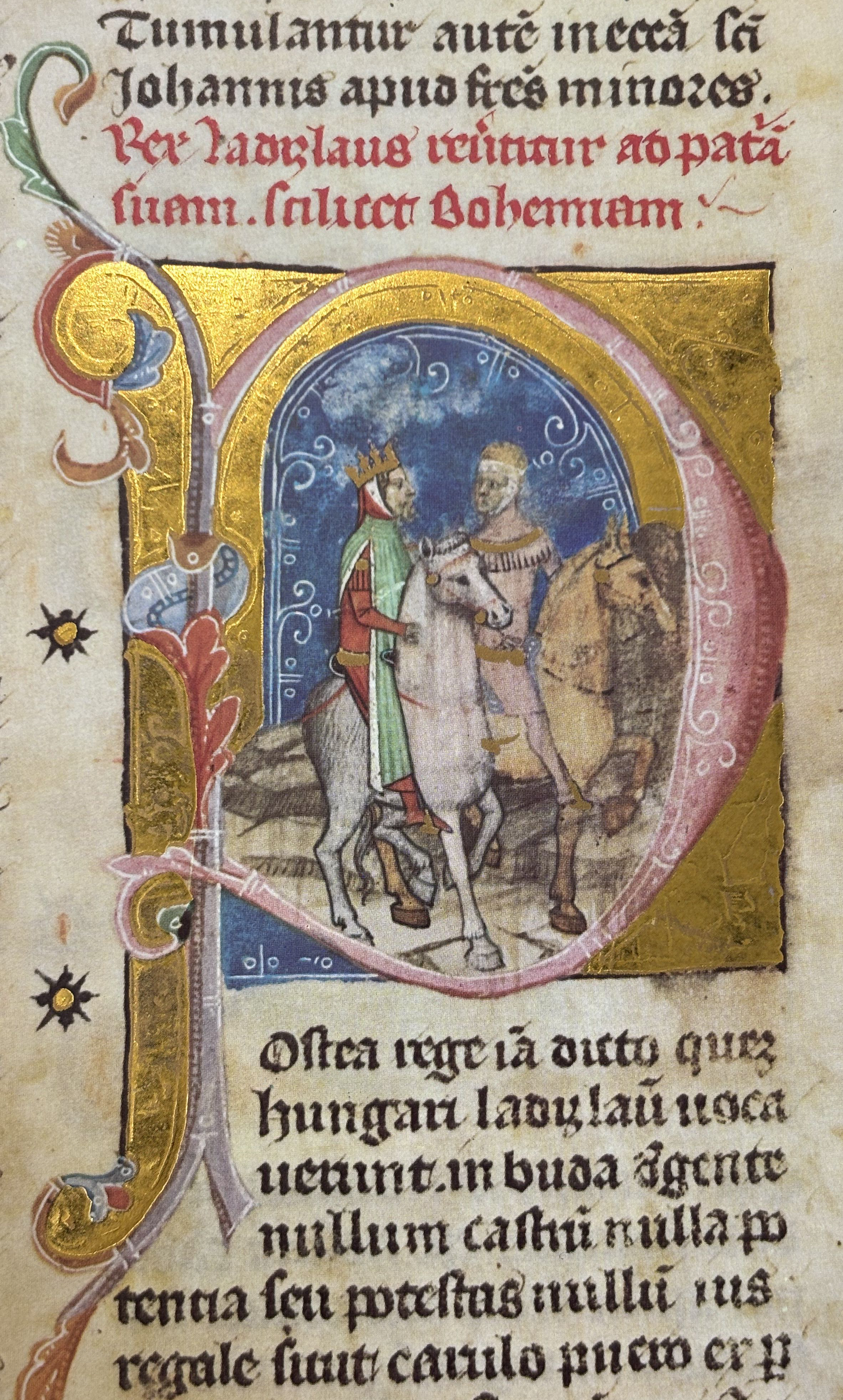
Wenceslaus leaves Hungary (from the Illuminated Chronicle)

18th-century theologian and historian Péter Bod identified the spiritual leaders of the heretical movement as Waldensians, based on this, György Székely also shared that standpoint. After analyzing parallel phenomena, Péter Galambosi considered, the leaders in Buda belonged to the Lombardy branch of the Waldensians (also known as "The Poor of Lombardy"). The Waldensians said the Holy See was not eligible for the collection of tithe, which provided an ideological basis to the secular city council, which refused to pay ecclesiastical taxes for years. The movement at Buda was a coalition of the malcontent local elite and the clergy, which reconciled its economic and religious aspects. It is plausible that the Waldensian ideology reached the town through the western trade route to southern German merchant cities. Historian László Zolnay argued the Buda heresy was supported by the local lower clergy; he also connected the near-contemporary poem Planctus clericorum (Hungarian: Papok siralma; "A Lamentation of Priests"), which was written around 1310, to the movement. Galambosi accepted this and argued the poem used the same texts from the Bible, which were incorporated into the argumentation of the Waldensians too. By name, only a certain priest, Louis (Ludwig) was referred to as a spiritual leader of the Buda heresy by the verdict of the 1307 national synod. The denomination "sacerdos" proves that once he was ordained as a priest (i.e. not "false" or disguised), but later affected by heretic doctrines. The burghers and their elite, who had supported the movement, were definitely not convinced Waldensians, they cooperated with the ascetic heresy due to political motivation. Petermann and his councilors endorsed that movement, which questioned the legal basis of the economic claims of their rivals, the church institutions and weakened its moral authority.

The verdict of the synod in 1307 definitely states that a faction of the city council, led by Petermann had affiliated with the heretics for nine years, thus around 1298, which reflects the growing tension with the Holy See in that year (as mentioned above). According to Galambosi, the burghers of Buda did not support the Waldensian movement uniformly. While the city council fought for the enforcement of urban privileges, represented by Werner, then his son Ladislaus, its some members were additionally also confronted with the ecclesiastical institutions in a matters of a private nature, for instance rich merchants Kunc and Hermann, who had valid contract with the Diocese of Veszprém. Because of their economic vulnerability, the latter group became much more radical and refused Werner's cautious and backward policy. It is plausible that the Werners' long-time rival, the Walter family were behind the case. Andrew, son of Walter related to Kunc and Petermann. Four members of the 12-member city council (Kunc, Petermann, Hermann and Martin) confronted the church in the past decades; they were considered the internal opposition to Werner and his faction. Because of their harsh pro-Wenceslaus and anticlerical positions, Ladislaus, son of Werner possibly gradually became a partisan of Charles of Anjou after the failed siege in September 1302. His room for maneuver, however, narrowed; upon the request of Petermann and his allies, he was imprisoned by King Wenceslaus II, when the Bohemians decided to left Hungary. Petermann, who came from a prestigious family (his father, Kunc held functions in the royal mintage), was installed as the new rector thereafter. His party also welcomed the arriving Otto of Bavaria in December 1305. However several burgher families, for instance the Hencfis and the Weidners, supported the claim of Charles and did not recognize the Waldensian heresy in their town.

== Fall and retaliation ==
After these happenings, Ladislaus, son of Werner, was released in the third year [1307] from the captivity in which he was held by King Wenceslaus. Together with John, son of Csák, on the Thursday after the feast of the blessed Petronella the Virgin [1 June], he entered the castle of Buda in the silence of the night by the gate which is next to the synagogue of the Jews, and by a sudden attack he overpowered and killed those citizens of Buda who were his enemies and traitors. Peterman, the magistrate of the city, had to flee naked and barely escaped. Two of the citizens, namely Morhan Hermann and Master Martin, sworn citizens of the council of twelve, he caused to be tied to the tails of horses and cruelly dragged through the streets and squares of the city, and their bones he caused to be burned in the fire. He confiscated and appropriated their property. Those treacherous priests of whom we have spoken he delivered over, bound hand and foot, to Thomas, archbishop of Esztergom, who placed them in prison, where they miserably expired their souls.

— The Hungarian Illuminated Chronicle

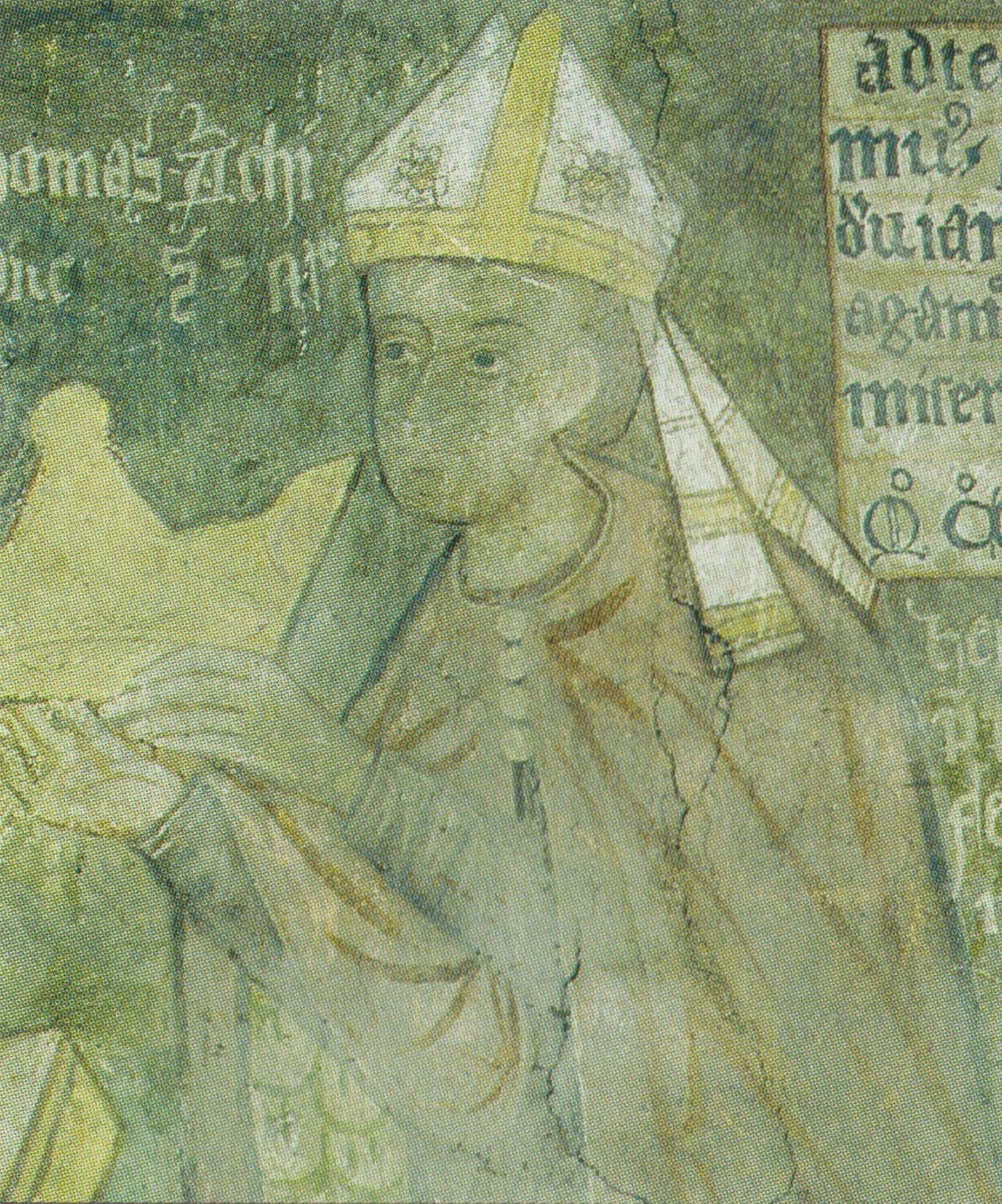
Archbishop Thomas of Esztergom, a key figure in the suppression of the heretical movement in Buda

Otto was never able to strengthen his position in Hungary, because only the Kőszegis and the Transylvanian Saxons supported him. Charles seized Esztergom and many fortresses in the northern parts of Hungary in 1306. The town of Buda had gradually isolated, as it walls were surrounded by the lands of barons and towns, who swore loyalty to the House of Anjou one after another prior to 1307. After returning tho his episcopal see, the pro-Charles prelate, Thomas, Archbishop of Esztergom convoked a provincial synod to Udvard, Komárom County (present-day Dvory nad Žitavou, Slovakia) in May 1307, where the prelates excommunicated the burghers of Buda, who had supported the "schismatics" (by name Petermann, Martin and priest Louis) and placed the town under interdict. With that, Archbishop Thomas renewed the former ecclesiastical punishments against the town, issued by Gregory Bicskei, papal legate Niccolò Boccasini and Michael Bő. Thomas announced a period of 40-day forgiveness to all attackers of the city; thus practically the archbishop called for a crusade against Buda, which was declared as a "prey" for all marauders, as historians Ferenc Salamon and László Zolnay emphasized. Enikő Spekner argued that the subsequent excommunications only applied to Louis and his followers, and not to the entire city.

Escaping from his Bohemian captivity, the ex-rector Ladislaus, son of Werner marched into the town with the assistance of John Csák's troops on 1 June 1307. As the Illuminated Chronicle narrates, Ladislaus and John infiltrated into the fort through the gate next to the Jewish synagogue at night. Their troops clashed with the guards of the city council, who refused to acknowledge Charles as their legitimate king. The pro-Wenceslaus rector Petermann escaped from the scene without clothing, while other German burghers were tortured and massacred. John Csák captured and sent priest Louis and those local clergymen, who had participated in the suppressed Waldensian movement, to the court of Archbishop Thomas of Esztergom. The chronicle says, the friars and clergymen died in the archbishop's prison in the midst of suffering.

The papal legate Gentile Portino da Montefiore convoked the synod of the Hungarian prelates, who declared the monarch inviolable in December 1308. After Ladislaus Kán refused to hand over the Holy Crown to Charles, the legate consecrated a new crown for the king. Archbishop Thomas crowned Charles king with the new crown in the Church of Our Lady in Buda on 15 or 16 June 1309. Rector Ladislaus also attended the ceremony, representing the burghers of the town. When Matthew Csák laid siege Buda in June 1311, the citizens did not rebel against Charles and remained in their loyalty. Salamon and Zolnay considered this date the final reconciliation between Charles and the town. In response, Charles confirmed the privileges of Buda and permitted its autonomous right of coinage (Latin: Libertas Budensium) in that year. However, Matthew Csák's rapid attack also demonstrated the vulnerability of Buda. Amidst his unification war against the oligarchic powers, Charles transferred his residence from Buda to Temesvár (present-day Timișoara in Romania) in early 1315. Despite that, the town of Buda remained a strong pillar of Charles' reign under the reign of rectors Ladislaus, son of Werner, then John Hencfi.

== In historiography ==
The heretic movement at Buda and its activity were first recorded by a chronicle written by a contemporary anonymous Minorite friar during the reign of Charles I. Based on this, the Illuminated Chronicle, written a few years later, also narrated the events. Historian László Zolnay emphasized the contemporaries even tried to erase the memory of the movement, the events are only indirectly covered by diplomas and documents. When Archbishop Thomas convoked a provincial synod and placed Buda under interdict in May 1307, its document does not mention the excommunication of the Pope prior to his, and only refers that the priests of Buda "celebrated Masses" and "administered their sacraments" despite the ecclesiastical punishment hit the inhabitants of the city. As a result, some historians, including Vilmos Fraknói questioned the existence of the heretic movement and the Pope's alleged excommunication. However near-contemporaneous documents indirectly confirm the chronicles' narrations. It is possible that the unidentified Minorite friar magnified the importance of the excommunication of the Pope in his work, because for him this was the most scandalous aspect of the events.

Academic and historian Ferenc Salamon published the first monograph of the history of Budapest in 1885. In his work, he dated the events to 1302; accordingly, after Charles of Anjou unsuccessfully laid siege to Buda in September 1302, the burghers who were "overconfident by triumph", unilaterally absolved themselves of the Church's punishment and, cooperating with local priests supporting them, excommunicated Pope Boniface VIII (i.e. not Benedict) and the Hungarian prelates, who were pro-Charles in majority. Salamon did not mention the existence of a specific religious hereditary movement, he considered this was a merely politically motivated, occasional step by the local citizens, without ideology. Marxist historian György Székely connected the schism at Buda to the anti-feudal aspirations of the peasantry in 1953. Later, he introduced the events in the context of the development of local city council in Buda in his French-language study in 1971.

László Zolnay was the first historian, who wrote a separate study on heretics at Buda in 1961. He dated the event to the autumn of 1302 and compared it to the contemporary long-standing hostility between the Holy See and the Kingdom of France, when Philip IV threw Pope Boniface's bull Ausculta Fili into a blazing fireplace in February 1302. According to Zolnay, after Charles' unsuccessful siege of Buda, his patron, the Catholic Church excommunicated the town, which refused to surrender; in response, the local city council, with the support of Wenceslaus and his court (who was an ally of Philip), excommunicated the church immediately. Historian Péter Galambosi questioned the legitimacy of the comparison, as Philip IV, who tried to extend his sovereignty in church politics, had a different kind of conflict with the Roman Curia. Galambosi emphasized, the Přemyslids entered alliance with Philip only in 1303. In addition, he argued, there is no source for the king and his father were involved in the events, even the pro-Angevin chronicles did not mention that. Historian András Kubinyi considered (1961) that the burghers' "revolutionary action" took place sometime between August 1304 (Wenceslaus' departure to Bohemia) and December 1305 (Otto's arrival to the town), during a political vacuum in the royal town of Buda. Kubinyi said the city council has ruled the city in a sovereign manner in this one and a half year interval. He also argued the local burghers participated in the movement uniformly. Galambosi, who wrote his essay in the subject in 2018, questioned the latter item and wrote about the city council's internal political struggles and break lines. Enikő Spekner also argued that the heretic movement has become less and less represented over the years as a proportion of the will of the local burgher community.

== In popular culture ==
Journalist and writer Imre Kőszegi (1903–1995) depicted the events with various fictive elements in his youth novel Buda pápát átkoz ("Buda curses a Pope") in 1977.

== Sources ==
=== Primary sources ===
- The Hungarian Illuminated Chronicle: Chronica de Gestis Hungarorum (Edited by Dezső Dercsényi) (1970). Corvina, Taplinger Publishing. ISBN 0-8008-4015-1.

=== Secondary studies ===
- Engel, Pál (2001). The Realm of St Stephen: A History of Medieval Hungary, 895–1526. I.B. Tauris Publishers. ISBN 1-86064-061-3.
- Galambosi, Péter (2018). "A budai eretnekmozgalom (1304–1307) [The Heretical Movement in Buda (1304–1307)]". In Kádas, István; Skorka, Renáta; Weisz, Boglárka (eds.). Veretek, utak, katonák. Gazdaságtörténeti tanulmányok a magyar középkorról (in Hungarian). MTA Bölcsészettudományi Kutatóközpont. pp. 223–245. ISBN 978-963-416-124-0.
- Molnár, Miklós (2001). A Concise History of Hungary. Cambridge University Press. ISBN 978-0-521-66736-4.
- Spekner, Enikő (2015). Hogyan lett Buda a középkori Magyarország fővárosa? A budai királyi székhely története a 12. század végétől a 14. század közepéig [How did Buda become the capital of medieval Hungary? The history of the royal seat of Buda from the end of the twelfth century to the middle of the fourteenth] (in Hungarian). Budapesti Történeti Múzeum. ISBN 978-615-5341-19-9.
- Zolnay, László (1961). "Amikor a budaiak kiátkozták a pápát [When the Residents in Buda Excommunicated the Pope]". Világosság (in Hungarian). 2 (5): 37–41. ISSN 0505-5849.
