= Anthony (bishop of Csanád) =

13th-century Hungarian Catholic bishop

Anthony O.F.M.
- Bishop of Csanád
- Installed: 1293/1298
- Term ended: 1307
- Predecessor: Gregory
- Successor: Benedict
- Other posts: Vice-chancellor; Chancellor

Personal details
- Died: August 1307
- Denomination: Catholic Church

Anthony (Hungarian: Antal; died August 1307) was a Hungarian Franciscan friar and prelate at the turn of the 13th and 14th centuries, who served as Bishop of Csanád from around 1298 until his death. He was a confidant of Andrew III of Hungary, serving his vice-chancellor in his last regnal years. During the era of Interregnum, he supported the claim of Wenceslaus then Otto against Charles I. Serving him as chancellor, he crowned the latter with the Holy Crown in 1305.

== Bishop of Csanád ==
=== Early years ===
Anthony was elected as bishop sometime between 1293 and 1298, becoming the first Franciscan bishop in the Kingdom of Hungary. There is no information of him prior to his election. He first appears in this dignity in February 1298, when escorted Andrew III and Queen Agnes of Austria, who visited Albert of Austria in Vienna and promised to support him against Adolf of Nassau, King of Germany. He was present at the betrothal of Wenceslaus, son of Wenceslaus II of Bohemia, and Elizabeth, daughter of Andrew III. Anthony was made vice-chancellor of the royal court around March 1298, replacing Gregory Bicskei, who was elected Archbishop of Esztergom a month before. Anthony acquired the position as a protege of John Hont-Pázmány, Archbishop of Kalocsa, who headed the royal council. He first appears in this capacity on 29 March 1298. The charter of Andrew III refers to him "fratris Anthoni de ordine fratrum minorum". Contemporary documents (and the Illuminated Chronicle) frequently style Anthony as "frater". Along with the majority of prelates, Anthony was a strong confidant of Andrew III, whose legitimacy was disputed by the Capetian House of Anjou. Anthony functioned as vice-chancellor until July 1299, when a national diet took place. A non-authentic charter allegedly from 1300 also styles him with this title. Anthony performed a diplomatic mission to Brno (Brünn) in May 1299, where, as representative of the Hungarian king, he participated in the meeting between Wenceslaus II of Bohemia and Leo I of Galicia. Andrew III sought a peaceful settlement with Władysław Łokietek, his former ally.

Shortly after his election, Gregory Bicskei turned against Andrew III and the Hungarian prelates, who unanimously supported the monarch, because he wanted to reach the papal confirmation of his election as soon as possible. Pope Boniface VIII refused to do that, and appointed him as apostolic administrator of the archdiocese only. The conflict emerged between the politically isolated Bicskei and the rest of the Hungarian prelates – led by Archbishop John Hont-Pázmány – in the upcoming years. During that time, Bicskei was the only prelate, who became a strong advocate of the claim of Charles of Anjou to the Hungarian throne. The young Charles landed at Split in Dalmatia in August 1300 to assert his claim to the throne. Anthony, along with other suffragans and clerics, resided in Rome in the second half of that year on the occasion of the First Christian jubilee. There, he acted as a judge in the lawsuit between Benedict Rád, Bishop of Veszprém and the abbot of the Bélakút Abbey over the right of collection of tithes of St. Gerard church in Kelenföld. In this capacity, Anthony mediated the agreement between them in September 1300 (Anthony issued a charter regarding this case in September 1302). Meanwhile, Andrew III sent his envoy, an Italian merchant Petrus de Bonzano from Tarvisio to represent his efforts in Rome. The Hungarian monarch wanted to achieve that Pope Boniface appoint his confidant Anthony as Archbishop of Esztergom, instead of Bicskei. Andrew III sent large amount of gold to Bonzano in order to support Anthony's case in the papal court. The merchant changed these to 4,500 golden florins and commissioned the amount to a merchant from Florence. Upon the instruction of the king, Bonzano handed over 40 marks to Anthony, "who had nothing". Although the pope refused to appoint Anthony, but he still did not confirm the election of Bicskei either, despite the fact that Andrew III provided Anthony with a large sum of money to further his cause. Still in Rome, Anthony and other prelates granted the right of indulgence to the Klosterneuburg Monastery in November 1300. Historian Sarolta Homonnai argued it was not in the pope's interest to appoint a strictly pro-royal prelate to the position of archbishop of Esztergom.

=== During the Interregnum ===
Andrew III died on 14 January 1301, resulting the extinction of the ruling Árpád dynasty. Anthony supported the claim of the young Wenceslaus to the Hungarian throne, along with overwhelming majority of the prelates led by John Hont-Pázmány. According to the Illuminated Chronicle, Anthony was member of that diplomatic mission led by the archbishop, along with several bishops and barons, who met King Wenceslaus II of Bohemia in Hodonín in August 1301, where the king accepted their offer in his eleven-year-old son's name. He also attended the coronation of Wenceslaus in the same month. Anthony was a participant of the national synod convoked by papal legate Niccolò Boccasini (future Pope Benedict XI) in October 1301. Together with other prelates, he followed the papal legate to Pressburg (today Bratislava, Slovakia) in November 1301, who established his residence there. Anthony also dealt with ecclesiastical affairs in these years. Alongside other prelates, he permitted indulgence to the Poor Clares of Nagyszombat (today Trnava, Slovakia) in July 1301. He also testified in the trial regarding the election of provost of Szepes Chapter (today Spišská Kapitula, Slovakia) before the court of papal legate Niccolò Boccasini in January 1302.

After Boccasini left Hungary for Vienna in July 1302, Anthony returned to Buda, Wenceslaus' seat. He was present, along with Benedict Rád, when Charles' army unsuccessfully attempted to capture the capital in September 1302. Pope Boniface VIII declared Charles of Anjou the lawful king of Hungary on 31 May 1303, stating that Wenceslaus' election had been invalid. By that time, majority of the prelates had already switched to the side of Charles one after another, but Anthony and Benedict Rád remained partisans of Wenceslaus, despite that the papal bull threatened his subjects with excommunication. His father realized that Wenceslaus' position could not be strengthened and took him back from Hungary to Bohemia in August 1304. However, Anthony still refused to acknowledge Charles I as the lawful king. He was not among those prelates, who escorted the monarch to Pressburg in the same month, where he met Rudolf III of Austria. Wenceslaus who had succeeded his father in Bohemia renounced his claim to Hungary in favor of Otto III, Duke of Bavaria on 9 October 1305.

Upon the invitation of the Kőszegis, Otto and his accompaniment, carrying the Holy Crown, arrived to Hungary in November. Otto was crowned with the Holy Crown in Székesfehérvár on 6 December 1305 by Benedict Rád and Anthony (i.e. it did not fulfill one of the criteria for a regular coronation, because the archbishop of Esztergom was not the celebrant). Historian Renáta Skorka argued the two bishops only pretended to side with Otto to regain the Holy Crown, but the land grants made to Benedict Rád by Otto contradict this. The monarch appointed Anthony as his chancellor by April 1306 at the latest. He held this dignity until his death. One of the king's charters incorrectly refers to him as vice-chancellor. Pope Clement V was outraged by the resistance of Anthony. Therefore, on 10 August 1307, he instructed the two Hungarian archbishops, Thomas of Esztergom and Vincent of Kalocsa to summon the suffragan before the papal curia because of his involvement in Otto's coronation, and to proclaim the papal judgment that Charles is the rightful Hungarian king (however, another papal letter with the same date refers to Anthony as "late", thus Clement's verdict perhaps attributed to Benedict Rád). This is the last information about Anthony, he died sometime in August 1307, shortly after his lord Otto was imprisoned in Transylvania. His successor Benedict is first mentioned as bishop on 3 September 1307.

== Sources ==
- Engel, Pál (1996). Magyarország világi archontológiája, 1301–1457, I. [Secular Archontology of Hungary, 1301–1457, Volume I] (in Hungarian). História, MTA Történettudományi Intézete. ISBN 963-8312-44-0.
- Homonnai, Sarolta (2003). "III. András hatalmának stabilitása és politikai szándékai Bonzano Péter jelentéseinek tükrében [The Power Stability and Political Intentions of Andrew III in the Light of Peter Bonzano's Reports]". Acta Universitatis Szegediensis: Acta Historica (in Hungarian). 117: 63–74. ISSN 0324-6965.
- Juhász, Kálmán (1933). A csanádi püspökség története (1243–1307) [The History of the Diocese of Csanád (1243–1307)] (in Hungarian). Csanádvármegyei Könyvtár 24.
- Kádár, Tamás (2015). "Harcban a koronáért. I. Károly (Róbert) király uralkodásának első évei 1305 végéig [Fight for the Crown. The First Regnal Years of Charles I (Robert) until the End of 1305]". Történeti Tanulmányok. Acta Universitatis Debreceniensis (in Hungarian). 23: 42–111. ISSN 1217-4602.
- Kádár, Tamás (2017). "Harcban a koronáért. (II.) I. Károly (Róbert) király uralkodásának 1306–1310 közötti szakasza [Fight for the Crown. The Reign of Charles I (Robert) from 1306 to 1310]". Történeti Tanulmányok. Acta Universitatis Debreceniensis (in Hungarian). 25: 126–192. ISSN 1217-4602.
- Maléth, Ágnes (2020). A Magyar Királyság és a Szentszék kapcsolata I. Károly korában (1301–1342) [The Relationship of the Hungarian Kingdom and the Holy See in the time of Charles I (1301–1342)] (in Hungarian). Pécsi Tudományegyetem BTK TTI Középkori és Koraújkori Történeti Tanszék. ISBN 978-963-429-500-6.
- Markó, László (2006). A magyar állam főméltóságai Szent Istvántól napjainkig: Életrajzi Lexikon [Great Officers of State in Hungary from King Saint Stephen to Our Days: A Biographical Encyclopedia] (in Hungarian). Helikon Kiadó. ISBN 963-208-970-7.
- Rudolf, Veronika (2023). Közép-Európa a hosszú 13. században [Central Europe in the Long 13th Century] (in Hungarian). Arpadiana XV., Research Centre for the Humanities. ISBN 978-963-416-406-7.
- Zsoldos, Attila (2011). Magyarország világi archontológiája, 1000–1301 [Secular Archontology of Hungary, 1000–1301] (in Hungarian). História, MTA Történettudományi Intézete. ISBN 978-963-9627-38-3.

Catholic Church titles
Preceded by Gregory	Bishop of Csanád; 1298–1307	Succeeded by Benedict
Political offices
Preceded by Gregory Bicskei	Vice-chancellor; 1298–1299	Succeeded by Ladislaus Aba
Preceded by John Hont-Pázmány	Chancellor for Otto; 1306	Succeeded by Vincent for Charles I
