= Sirokay =

Sirokay is a Hungarian surname. Notable people with the surname include:

- Miklós Sirokay (?–1355/58), Voivod of Transylvania 1342-1344
- László Sirokay (?–1487), Bishop of Nicopolis
- Zsuzsanna Sirokay (born 1941), pianist

== See also ==
- Široké
