= Stephen of Gyulafehérvár =

Hungarian cleric

Stephen
- Archdeacon of Gyulafehérvár
- Installed: 1297
- Term ended: 1303 or after
- Predecessor: Agapetus (eventually)
- Successor: John Nobilis (?)
- Other post: Vice-chancellor

Personal details
- Died: after 1303
- Denomination: Roman Catholic
- Education: University of Padua

Stephen (Hungarian: István; died after 1303) was a Hungarian cleric at the turn of the 13th and 14th centuries, who served as archdeacon of Gyulafehérvár (present-day Alba Iulia, Romania) from around 1297 to 1303. He was the last vice-chancellor of Andrew III. He functioned in the same capacity in the court of Charles I, one of the claimants to the Hungarian throne.

== Career ==
Stephen attended the University of Padua, according to a record from February 1296. He studied together with Gregory Bicskei and a certain Stephanus Catastani. Before that, three of them resided in the court of James II of Aragon for quite a long time. During his studies, Stephen obtained the title of magister and, as canon, he also held a benefice in the cathedral chapter of Padua. Returning Hungary, Stephen was elected archdeacon of Gyulafehérvár in the Diocese of Transylvania, first mentioning in this capacity in January 1297.

Succeeding Ladislaus Aba, Stephen was made vice-chancellor in the royal court of Andrew III sometime in the early months of 1300. Similarly to his predecessors, he was a confidant of John Hont-Pázmány, Archbishop of Kalocsa, who headed the royal council. Stephen held the office until the death of Andrew III and the extinction of the Árpád dynasty in January 1301. Thereafter, he joined the partisans of Charles of Anjou, one of the claimants to the Hungarian throne. On his king's behalf, he was a member of that delegation consisted of prelates and clerics, who negotiated with Pope Boniface VIII in May 1303, who then declared Charles the lawful king of Hungary. The delegation, including Stephen, resided already in Naples in late June 1303, where they met Charles II and Mary, grandparents of the Hungarian monarch. He was made vice-chancellor of Charles' court after the death of Gregory Bicskei in September 1303 (appearing in two documents in this capacity, but without the mention of his ecclesiastical office). This is the last information about him. The next known vice-chancellor was John Bogátradvány, who acquired the position in 1307, while the next archdeacon of Gyulafehérvár, John Nobilis first appears in contemporary records only in 1315.

== Identification ==
Since there were several Stephens at the turn of the 13th and 14th centuries, it is difficult to identify and separate them. László Fejérpataky assumed identification between the archdeacon and that Stephen, who, as decretorum doctor ("doctor of canon law") and a canon of Prague, functioned as vice-chancellor of Wenceslaus (Charles' rival) from 1302 to 1304. Based on this, Attila Zsoldos considered that archdeacon Stephen continuously held the office of royal vice-chancellor from 1300 to 1304. Vilmos Fraknói and György Bónis identified archdeacon Stephen with Stephen Kéki, future Bishop of Veszprém, combining all the data that refers to a cleric named Stephen. Aladár Szabó considered that Stephen initially supported Wenceslaus (becoming his vice-chancellor), but thereafter switched to the partisans of Charles. However, decretorum doctor Stephen headed Wenceslaus' chancellery still in March 1304, which excludes the identity of the two persons. György Rácz argued that archdeacon Stephen is not identical with Wenceslaus' vice-chancellor nor Stephen Kéki, but agreed that the archdeacon later (in 1303) became vice-chancellor in the court of Charles I.

== Sources ==
- Haraszti Szabó, Péter; Kelényi, Borbála (2019). Magyarországi diákok francia, angol, itáliai és német egyetemeken a középkorban, 1100–1526 [Students from Hungary at the Universities of France, England, Italy and Germany in the Middle Ages 1100–1526] (in Hungarian). ELTE Egyetemi Könyvtár és Levéltár; MTA ELTE Egyetemtörténeti Kutatócsoport. ISBN 978-963-489-098-0.
- Hegyi, Géza (2019). "Az erdélyi káptalan Árpád- és Anjou-kori archontológiája (1199–1387) [The Archontology of the Transylvanian Chapter in the Age of Árpáds and Angevins (1199–1387)]". Turul (in Hungarian). 92 (2). Magyar Heraldikai és Genealógiai Társaság: 69–94. ISSN 1216-7258.
- Rácz, György (2021). "Kéki István veszprémi püspökségének problémiái: származása, az örökös ispáni cím és a Csepel-szigeti tizedek kérdése [Problems of István Kéki's episcopate of Veszprém: his ancestry, the title of perpetual stewardship and the tithes of Csepel island]". In Karlinszky, Balázs; Varga, Tibor László (eds.). "Capella reginalis". A veszprémi püspökség a középkorban (A veszprémi egyházmegye múltjából 38.) (in Hungarian). Veszprémi Főegyházmegyei Levéltár. pp. 27–47. ISBN 978-615-81349-6-5.
- Szabó, Aladár (1916). "Venczel és Ottó királyok oklevelei [The Charters of Kings Wenceslaus and Otto]". Turul (in Hungarian). 34 (1). Magyar Heraldikai és Genealógiai Társaság: 13–46. ISSN 1216-7258.
- Zsoldos, Attila (2011). Magyarország világi archontológiája, 1000–1301 [Secular Archontology of Hungary, 1000–1301] (in Hungarian). História, MTA Történettudományi Intézete. ISBN 978-963-9627-38-3.

Political offices
Preceded by Ladislaus Aba	Vice-chancellor; 1300–1301	Succeeded by Gregory Bicskei
Preceded by Gregory Bicskei	Vice-chancellor for Charles I 1303	Succeeded by John Bogátradvány
