= Stephen of Prague =

Hungarian cleric

Stephen (Czech: Štěpán, Hungarian: István; died after 1304) was a Bohemian cleric in the early 14th century, who served as vice-chancellor in the Kingdom of Hungary, serving his lord Wenceslaus from 1302 to 1304.

== Career ==
Several historians incorrectly identified him with Stephen, the archdeacon of Gyulafehérvár (today Alba Iulia, Romania), who studied in the University of Padua and served as the last vice-chancellor of Andrew III of Hungary until 1301. However that Stephen again became vice-chancellor in 1303, in the court of Charles I, Wenceslaus' rival during the era of Interregnum.

Historian György Rácz considered this Stephen was a Bohemian cleric and came to Hungary in the accompaniment of the young Wenceslaus in August 1301. He bore the title of decretorum doctor ("doctor of canon law"), which reflects his university studies abroad. His name first appears in Hungarian contemporary records in November 1301, when resided in Buda Castle and was among those clerics, who testified that a lawsuit postposed between the Diocese of Veszprém and the Knights Hospitaller of Esztergom. According to the document, Stephen was a canon in the cathedral chapter of Prague.

After Jan Muskata returned to Bohemia in early 1302, Stephen succeeded him as Wenceslaus' vice-chancellor. He is first mentioned in this capacity in February 1302. He formulated that royal charter, in which Wenceslaus granted whole Nyitra County to the powerful oligarch Matthew Csák. He is again mentioned as vice-chancellor throughout 1302, in January 1303 and March 1304. When Wenceslaus II of Bohemia took his son back from Hungary to Bohemia in August 1304, Stephen also left the kingdom, abandoning his office.

== Sources ==
- Haraszti Szabó, Péter; Kelényi, Borbála (2019). Magyarországi diákok francia, angol, itáliai és német egyetemeken a középkorban, 1100–1526 [Students from Hungary at the Universities of France, England, Italy and Germany in the Middle Ages 1100–1526] (in Hungarian). ELTE Egyetemi Könyvtár és Levéltár; MTA ELTE Egyetemtörténeti Kutatócsoport. ISBN 978-963-489-098-0.
- Rácz, György (2021). "Kéki István veszprémi püspökségének problémiái: származása, az örökös ispáni cím és a Csepel-szigeti tizedek kérdése [Problems of István Kéki's episcopate of Veszprém: his ancestry, the title of perpetual stewardship and the tithes of Csepel island]". In Karlinszky, Balázs; Varga, Tibor László (eds.). "Capella reginalis". A veszprémi püspökség a középkorban (A veszprémi egyházmegye múltjából 38.) (in Hungarian). Veszprémi Főegyházmegyei Levéltár. pp. 27–47. ISBN 978-615-81349-6-5.
- Szabó, Aladár (1916). "Venczel és Ottó királyok oklevelei [The Charters of Kings Wenceslaus and Otto]". Turul (in Hungarian). 34 (1). Magyar Heraldikai és Genealógiai Társaság: 13–46. ISSN 1216-7258.

Political offices
| Preceded by Jan Muskata | Vice-chancellor for Wenceslaus; 1302–1304 | Succeeded by Office abolished |
