= Gregory Bicskei =

Hungarian clergyman (died 1303)

- Archbishop-elect of Esztergom
- Installed: 1298
- Term ended: 1303
- Predecessor: Lodomer
- Successor: Michael Bő

Personal details
- Died: 7 September 1303 Anagni
- Denomination: Roman Catholic
- Parents: Botond Bicskei
- Education: University of Padua

Gregory Bicskei (Hungarian: Bicskei Gergely; died 7 September 1303) was a prelate in the Kingdom of Hungary at the turn of the 13th and 14th centuries. He was the elected Archbishop of Esztergom between 1298 and 1303. Supporting the claim of the Capetian House of Anjou, he was a tough opponent of Andrew III of Hungary. He crowned Charles I king with a provisional crown in 1301. He was murdered in Anagni by soldiers whom Philip IV of France had sent to Italy to capture Pope Boniface VIII.

== Family ==
He was born into the gens (clan) Bicske, which possessed landholdings in Pest and Fejér counties. According to the Chronicon Posoniense ("Chronicle of Pressburg"; present-day Bratislava, Slovakia), his father was Botond, which fact was also confirmed by a letter of Pope Benedict XI. Botond was the first known member of the Bicskei (later also known as Szerdahelyi) family. Gregory had two brothers, Peter and John. According to a document dating from 1306, Peter and John were granted permission to levy tolls in the locality of Bicske by Charles I for their military merits. The Bicskeis' genealogical origin was first written by historian Antal Pór. Beforehand, Jesuit scholar György Pray incorrectly considered that Gregory originated from the gens Koppán (or Katapán), while Nándor Knauz also shared this opinion in his work Monumenta ecclesiae Strigoniensis.

Gregory was first mentioned by a contemporary record in September 1274, when a certain noble, John Csapoli, declaring that he has no legitimate heir, handed over a portion of his estate Csabdi as a morning-gift to his wife, Botond's sister. Thereafter she donated the land to her nephews, Peter, John and Gregory. In the same time, they bought the remainder of the estate from John Csapoli on the condition that he and his wife shall be provided with everything necessary until their death. The above contract of sale has been repeated in August–September 1291.

== Early career ==
As the youngest of the three brothers, Gregory entered ecclesiastical career. It is possible he is identical with that Gregory, a canon of Székesfehérvár, who represented his king Stephen V in a court of arbitration during a conflict between Philip of Spanheim, Patriarch of Aquileia and the Counts of Gorizia in 1271. He was appointed as a guardian (custos) of the Székesfehérvár Cathedral by provost Theodore Tengerdi sometime between April 1287, the last mention of his predecessor Michael, and February 1289, when Pope Nicholas IV requested trustees from guardian Gregory, cantor Esau and lector Paul to confirm Theodore Tengerdi as provost. Gregory was referred to as guardian in the period from 1287 to 1295. Balázs Kertész argued that Gregory was made guardian sometime between March and June 1287. Beside that, Gregory was also a canon of Esztergom. Benedict Rád, the Bishop of Veszprém nominated Gregory as his legal representative in the lawsuit over the tithe of the three villages of Marót between the diocese and the Dömös Chapter in May 1295. Archbishop Lodomer instructed Gregory (representative of Veszprém), Haab, Bishop of Vác (representative of Sal Hahót, the provost of Dömös) and Emeric, archdeacon of Hont (Lodomer's envoy) to meet in August in Buda. Gregory was present, but due to the absence of Benedict Rád, the trial was postponed to September.

Based on György Bónis, the Hungarian historiography considers that Gregory was elected provost of Székesfehérvár sometime between 24 and 28 April 1295, replacing Theodore Tengerdi. His involvement in the aforementioned lawsuit as guardian makes this assumption unlikely, according to historian Sándor Hunyadi. Gregory Bicskei, with the title of canon of Padua, attended the University of Padua; he was mentioned in this capacity in February 1296 along with Stephen of Gyulafehérvár and Stephanus Catastani. Before that they resided in the royal court of King James II of Aragon for a while, where they acted as envoys of Andrew III, who unsuccessfully tried to establish an alliance against the Angevins. As a result, Hunyadi considered Gregory was elected as provost only after his return to Hungary, sometime in the first half of 1297 (a new guardian named Andronicus also appeared in this dignity in that year). Refusing Hunyadi's argument, Balázs Kertész argued that Gregory became provost-elect in May or June 1295. Following his elevation as provost-elect, Lodomer, the incumbent Archbishop of Esztergom, personally wrote a letter to Pope Boniface VIII in order to confirm Bicskei's election. The document was part of the letter collection of Pietro della Vigna. It is possible that Gregory owned a copy of legal book compiled by the Italian scholar, demonstrating his skill in canon law. As Lodomer reported in the letter, Bicskei, who "was of great origin and had proficiency in canon law", was unable to make a personal journey to Rome because of the "poverty of the church [Székesfehérvár]" and the "intrigues of his relatives". As a result, the archbishop requested Boniface to let Bicskei to maintain his position as an apostolic administrator of Székesfehévár, which was under the direct jurisdiction of the Holy See. His letter clarifies that Gregory was initially belonged to that politically united prelacy, which aimed to strengthen the royal power to put an end to the political anarchy, and even confronted with the Holy See, supporting Andrew and his fight against the provincial lords.

In accordance with the Law of 1290–91, which legitimized a custom right, the office of royal vice-chancellery was permanently held by the provost of Székesfehérvár. Nonetheless, Bicskei replaced Theodore Tengerdi (now as Bishop of Győr) in this dignity only around October 1297. In that capacity, for instance, Bicskei formulated that royal charter on 2 November 1297, in which Andrew III donated Pozsony County to his spouse Queen Agnes, the daughter of Albert I of Germany.

== Archbishop-elect ==
=== Facing Andrew and the Hungarian prelacy ===
Archbishop Lodomer, who was Andrew's staunch ally in his struggles against the provincial lords, died on 2 January 1298. Bicskei was elected as his successor sometime between 18 January and 12 February. During that time, he was considered a loyal partisan of Andrew III, along with the other prelates of the church in Hungary. His candidacy was supported by the monarch too. Bicskei escorted King Andrew and Queen Agnes alongside other dignitaries to Austria on 12 February, where Andrew's only child Elizabeth of Töss was betrothed to Wenceslaus, the son and heir apparent of King Wenceslaus II of Bohemia. Bicskei was last styled as vice-chancellor on 24 February.

His relationship with the monarch and the other prelates had deteriorated permanently in the next six months. He refused to attend that assembly of the prelates, noblemen, Saxons, Székelys, and Cumans, which was summoned by Andrew in Pest in the summer of 1298. Historians agree that Bicskei wanted to reach the papal confirmation of his election as soon as possible, as a result he turned against Andrew and his courtiers, and became a strong advocate of the claim of Charles of Anjou to the Hungarian throne, who enjoyed Pope Boniface's support. With this step, Bicskei intended to disrupt the unity of the Hungarian prelates, who were the strongest pillars of Andrew's reign, but the suffragan bishops remained faithful to the monarch, with the leadership of John Hont-Pázmány, Archbishop of Kalocsa. One of the (23rd) articles of the 1298 diet established a four-member lesser council within the royal council, consisting of two nobles and prelates. Their veto power prevented Bicskei from sabotaging the operation of the royal council, which resulted his total isolation in the state government, despite his nominal leading position in the royal council. Although Bicskei unsuccessfully attempt to shift the prelates from supporting Andrew, but the king' confidence in the Hungarian clergy was shaken due to his activity, as a result he shortly entered into a formal alliance with five influential barons, who stated that they were willing to support him against the Pope and the bishops.

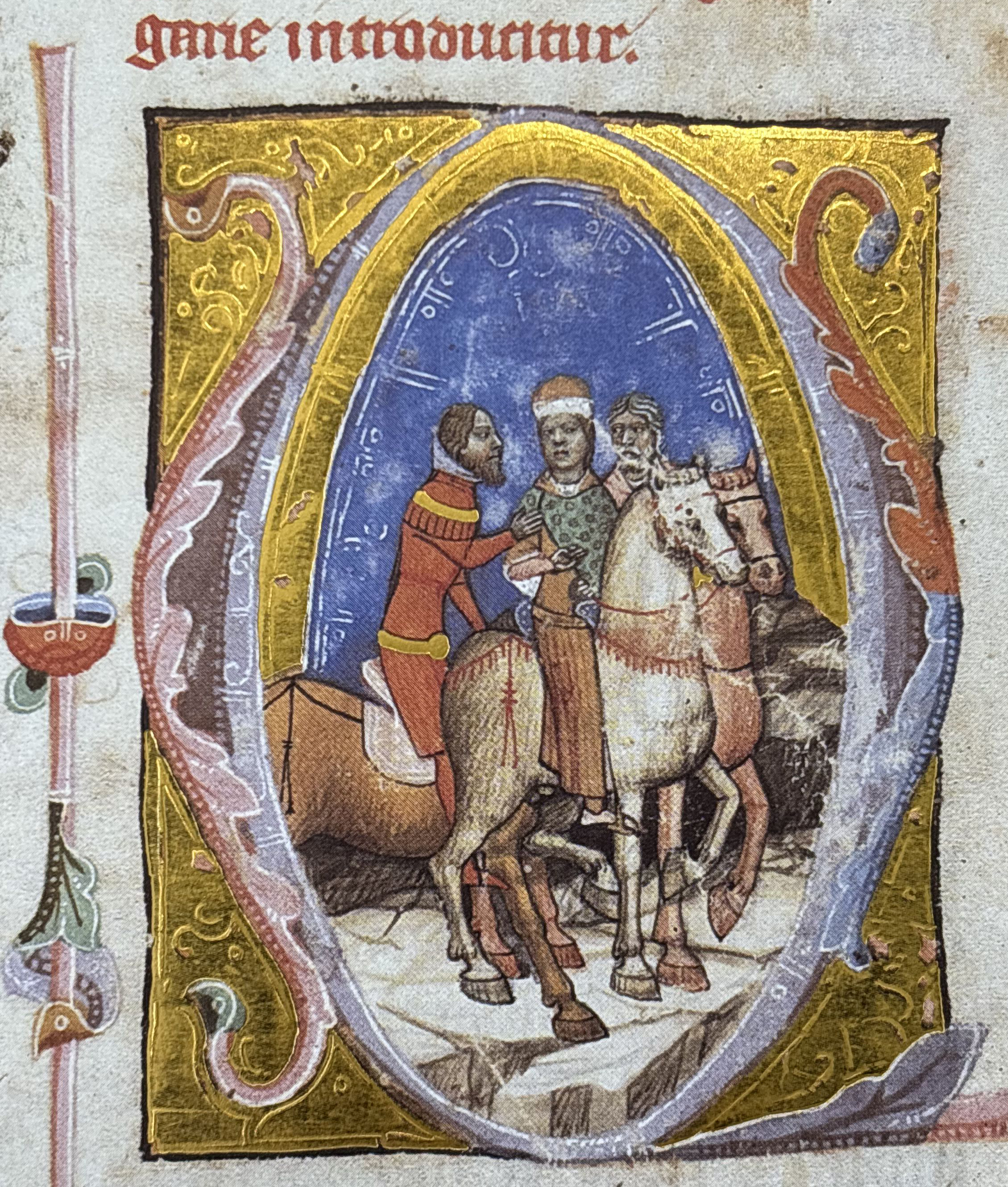
Charles I's arrival to Hungary, depicted in the Illuminated Chronicle

Pope Boniface refused to confirm Bicskei's election on 28 January 1299, but appointed him apostolic administrator of the archdiocese of Esztergom and the provostry of Székesfehérvár. The pope indicated with that if Gregory will represent faithfully the Holy See's interests in Hungary, will receive the final confirmation later, according to historian Attila Zsoldos. Other historians argue the papal rejection of his confirmation prove that Pope Boniface represented a neutral and cautious stance in the struggle between Andrew III and Charles of Anjou. The politically isolated Bicskei, who had hostile relation with the Hungarian clergy, could not be a useful local representative for the Roman Curia. Taking canon law into account, Gábor Thoroczkay emphasizes that Bicskei temporarily administered the archdiocese on behalf of the pope, and, consequently, he was not consecrated, which later became an important consideration in judging the legality of Charles' first coronation. Another aspect that a non-negligible part of the cathedral chapter of Esztergom opposed Bicskei's election in the previous year. Thereafter, Bicskei arbitrarily styled himself "the legate of the Holy See" in his documents. Obtaining the pope's empowerment, he absolved the members of the Kőszegi family from the excommunication on 19 March 1299, which was proclaimed by Lodomer years earlier. Bicskei also forbade the prelates to participate at a new diet which was held around May 1299. In the same time, he convened a synod to Veszprém with his self-declared authority of legate, and obliged the bishops to participate at the event, with the threat of excommunication. However, the prelates ignored the archbishop's order. On 6 July 1299, Emeric, Bishop of Várad was commissioned to send a letter to Pope Boniface to interpret the complaints of Andrew III, Archbishop John and the "entire prelacy and nobility" regarding the behavior of Bicskei and asked Boniface to place them under papal patronage against Bicskei. In the same time Andrew III sent two envoys, Paul, provost of Kalocsa, and Henry Balog, a royal councillor of the inner council, to the court of Esztergom to reconcile with the rebellious archbishop, but, by then, Bicskei resided in Transdanubia under the protection of the Kőszegis. Later he moved to Szentkereszt Castle beyond the Drava river between Koprivnica and Križevci, owned by the oligarch Ivan Kőszegi. As a delegated justice of the pope, Bicskei judged over the lawsuit between Buda and the Dominican nuns of Rabbits' Island regarding local fair duties in December 1299.

Andrew III deprived Bicskei from the perpetual ispánate of Esztergom County shortly before 29 January 1300, when the castellans of the confiscated Esztergom Castle, brothers Jaroslav and Barleus Divék were granted the title of ispán. In the same time, Andrew also sent his envoy, an Italian merchant Petrus de Bonzano from Tarvisio to represent his efforts in Rome. Andrew III wanted to achieve that the pope appoint his confidant Anthony, Bishop of Csanád as Archbishop of Esztergom, instead of Bicskei. Meanwhile, a group of powerful lords—including the Šubići, Kőszegis and Csáks—urged Charles II of Naples to send his grandson, Charles of Anjou, who came to the Kingdom of Hungary upon the invitation of an influential Croatian lord, Paul Šubić, in August 1300. He landed at Split in Dalmatia. Bicskei was among those dignitaries, who welcomed the young pretender. They jointly continued to travel to Zagreb. Pope Boniface refused to appoint Anthony, but still did not confirm the election of Bicskei. The Kőszegis and Matthew Csák, were shortly reconciled with Andrew, preventing Charles' success. Andrew, who had been in poor health for a while, was planning to capture his opponent, but he died in Buda Castle on 14 January 1301.

=== During the Interregnum ===
After learning the news, Charles hurried to Hungary with his small army, accompanied by Gregory Bicskei, Ugrin Csák and other nobles. They arrived to Székesfehérvár, the traditional crowning place of Hungary. However, according to abbot Ganfridus's letter to James II of Aragon, the burghers of the city closed the gate and did not allow the army to enter the city. Thereafter Bicskei placed Székesfehérvár under interdict at the end of February or early March. As the other pretenders, Wenceslaus and Otto were allowed to enter the settlement, historian Attila Zsoldos considered the magistrate of Fehérvár refused entry because of the doubtful legitimacy of Bicskei's status, whose position of archbishop-elect have not been universally recognized in Hungary by then. After that Charles moved to Esztergom, where Bicskei crowned him with a provisional crown before 13 May, following a possible short skirmish, as Bicskei did not own the castle and its town since January 1300. However, most Hungarians considered Charles's coronation unlawful because customary law required that it should have been performed with the Holy Crown of Hungary in Székesfehérvár.

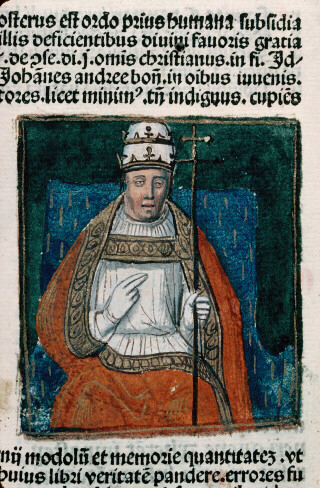
Pope Boniface VIII in a miniature

Among the prelates, only Bicskei, Michael Bő and John of Nyitra supported Charles' claim, while the majority of the Hungarian lords and prelates decided to offer the crown to the young Wenceslaus and sent a delegation to his father to Bohemia. Although Wenceslaus was crowned with the Holy Crown in Székesfehérvár, the legitimacy of his coronation was also questionable because John Hont-Pázmány put the crown on Wenceslaus's head, although customary law authorized the Archbishop of Esztergom to perform the ceremony. The Illuminated Chronicle claimed Wenceslaus was crowned by John, because the archiepiscopal see of Esztergom "was vacant". Some historians, including Gyula Kristó and Elemér Mályusz claimed, that chapter of the chronicle was written by a pro-Přemyslid Minorite friar, while philologist János Horváth argued the unconfirmed election of Bicskei was considered "invalid" in the eyes of his contemporaries. When Ivan Kőszegi, who became the strongest partisan of Wenceslaus, invaded and occupied Esztergom in August 1301, Bicskei sequestered to the territory of the Diocese of Eger. There he visited the castle of Boldogkő and successfully convinced the powerful oligarch Amadeus Aba to support Charles in the emerging conflict, while he also dealt with the possession cases of the provostry of Szepes (today Spišská Kapitula, Slovakia), which was vacated not long ago.

After Wenceslaus' coronation, Charles withdrew to Ugrin Csák's domains in the southern regions of the kingdom. Pope Boniface sent his legate, Niccolò Boccasini, to Hungary in May 1301. The pope instructed Gregory Bicskei to support him in fulfilling his mandate, nevertheless his name is never appeared in the accompaniment of Boccasini following that, which also shows the permanence of his political isolation. In October 1301, the legate summoned and convinced the majority of the Hungarian prelates to accept Charles's reign. The bishops, however, still did not recognize the legitimacy of Bicskei, as a result, Boccasini sent a letter to Pope Boniface, in which proposed that a consensual person fill the dignity. In response, Boniface warned his legate that he exceeded his powers, and preserved the personal selection of the archbishop for himself. The pope insisted on Bicskei, but he intended to maintain the status quo and did not confirm his 1298 election. Bicskei stayed in the royal camp, when Charles laid siege to Buda, the capital of the kingdom, in September 1302, but Ivan Kőszegi relieved the siege. When Bicskei issued a royal charter in Óbuda on 10 September, he was styled as "vice-chancellor". Around that time, he excommunicated the leaders of the heretical movement in Buda.

Pope Boniface, who regarded Hungary as a fief of the Holy See declared Charles the lawful king of Hungary on 31 May 1303. The papal bull was annunciated by Michael Bő and Stephen, the new Archbishop of Kalocsa, as Bicskei was even refused by the pro-Charles prelates in Hungary. According to another papal letter, Boniface entrusted the two archbishops Bicskei and Stephen with this task. Historian Gergely Kiss argued convincingly against the authenticity of the diploma and he regarded it as the private action of Bicskei who thus tried to gain room for maneuver in vain. Pope Boniface finally wanted to settle the question and summoned him into Rome. He arrived unfortunate moment to Anagni, the summer residence of the popes. On 7 September 1303, an army led by King Philip of France's minister Guillaume de Nogaret and Sciarra Colonna attacked Boniface at his palace. The pope was slapped in the face and captured, while Bicskei was killed in the skirmish along with many clergymen, locals and courtiers. His presence and death in Anagni were preserved by the chronicle of Michal Madius de Barbasanis.

== Sources ==
- Gerics, József (1987). A korai rendiség Európában és Magyarországon [The Early Society of Estates in Europe and Hungary] (in Hungarian). Akadémiai Kiadó. ISBN 963-05-4218-8.
- Homonnai, Sarolta (2003). "III. András hatalmának stabilitása és politikai szándékai Bonzano Péter jelentéseinek tükrében [The Power Stability and Political Intentions of Andrew III in the Light of Peter Bonzano's Reports]". Acta Universitatis Szegediensis: Acta Historica (in Hungarian). 117: 63–74. ISSN 0324-6965.
- Hunyadi, Sándor (2021). "Bicskei Gergely választott esztergomi érsek (1298–1303) [Gregory Bicskei elected Archbishop of Esztergom (1298–1303)]". Egyháztörténeti Szemle (in Hungarian). 22 (2): 163–188. ISSN 1585-7476.
- Kádár, Tamás (2015). "Harcban a koronáért. I. Károly (Róbert) király uralkodásának első évei 1305 végéig [Fight for the Crown. The First Regnal Years of Charles I (Robert) until the End of 1305]". Történeti Tanulmányok. Acta Universitatis Debreceniensis (in Hungarian). 23: 42–111. ISSN 1217-4602.
- Kertész, Balázs (2022). A székesfehérvári káptalan archontológiája és oklevéladó tevékenysége az Árpád-korban [The Archontology and Diploma Issuing Activity of the Chapter of Székesfehérvár in the Age of Árpáds] (in Hungarian). Városi Levéltár és Kutatóintézet. ISBN 978-963-8406-27-9.
- Kiss, Gergely (2018). "VIII. Bonifác és Magyarország (1290–1303). A pápai hatalmi legitimációs elképzelések és kormányzat összefüggései [Boniface VIII and Hungary (1290–1303). Ideas of Legitimating Papal Authority and Government in Context]". Századok (in Hungarian). 152 (6). Magyar Történelmi Társulat: 1353–1376. ISSN 0039-8098.
- Maléth, Ágnes (2020). A Magyar Királyság és a Szentszék kapcsolata I. Károly korában (1301–1342) [The Relationship of the Hungarian Kingdom and the Holy See in the time of Charles I (1301–1342)] (in Hungarian). Pécsi Tudományegyetem BTK TTI Középkori és Koraújkori Történeti Tanszék. ISBN 978-963-429-500-6.
- Szende, László (2003). "Bicskei Gergely [Gregory Bicskei]". In Beke, Margit (ed.). Esztergomi érsekek 1001–2003 [Archbishops of Esztergom 1001–2003] (in Hungarian). Szent István Társulat. pp. 134–142. ISBN 963-361-472-4.
- Szűcs, Jenő (2002). Az utolsó Árpádok [The Last Árpáds] (in Hungarian). Osiris Kiadó. ISBN 963-389-271-6.
- Thoroczkay, Gábor (2009). Írások az Árpád-korról: Történeti és historiográfiai tanulmányok [On the Age of the Árpáds: Historical and Historiographic Studies] (in Hungarian). L'Harmattan. ISBN 978-963-236-165-9.
- Zsoldos, Attila (2003). "III. András". In Szovák, Kornél; Szentpéteri, József; Szakács, Margit (eds.). Szent István és III. András [Saint Stephen and Andrew III] (in Hungarian). Kossuth Kiadó. pp. 119–227. ISBN 963-09-4461-8.
- Zsoldos, Attila (2009). "Anjou Károly első koronázása [The First Coronation of Charles of Anjou]". In Körmendi, Tamás; Thoroczkay, Gábor (eds.). Auxilium Historiae. Tanulmányok a hetvenesztendős Bertényi Iván tiszteletére (in Hungarian). Faculty of Arts, Eötvös Loránd University. pp. 405–413. ISBN 978-963-284-105-2.
- Zsoldos, Attila (2011). Magyarország világi archontológiája, 1000–1301 [Secular Archontology of Hungary, 1000–1301] (in Hungarian). História, MTA Történettudományi Intézete. ISBN 978-963-9627-38-3.

Gregory Bicskei Genus Bicske Born: ? Died: 7 September 1303
Catholic Church titles
Preceded by Theodore Tengerdi	Provost of Székesfehérvár (elected); 1295–1298	Succeeded by Ladislaus (elected)
Preceded by Lodomer	Archbishop of Esztergom (elected); 1298–1303	Succeeded by Michael Bő
Preceded by Ladislaus (elected)	Provost of Székesfehérvár (elected); 1299–1303	Succeeded by Thomas
Political offices
Preceded by Theodore Tengerdi	Vice-chancellor; 1297–1298	Succeeded by Anthony
Preceded by Lodomer	Ispán of Esztergom; 1298–1300	Succeeded by Jaroslav Divék & Barleus Divék
Preceded by Stephen	Vice-chancellor for Charles I 1300–1303	Succeeded by Stephen
