= Miklós Sirokay =

Former regional leader in modern-day Poland

Miklós Sirokay de Siroka (Hungarian: Sirokay Miklós; ? – 1355 or 1358), known as Nikolae Sirocai in Romania, was a voivode of Transylvania under the King of Hungary.

In 1342, after his promotion to the King's Chamberlain, he was made Voivode of Transylvania. In 1344 Louis I the Great stripped him of this title, though Sirokay remained in his favour. He later reappeared as a member of the King's court of justice. In 1348, he is mentioned as Baron.

== Literature ==
- Áldásy, Antal: Monumenta Hungariae Heraldica, Magyar Czimeres Emléknek, III. Füzet, Magyar Tudományos Akadémia támogatásával kiadja a Magyar Heraldikai és Genealogiai Társaság, 1926, pg. 48–50.
- Hóman, Bálint: Magyar Történet, II. Kötet, Budapest, Királyi Magyar Egyetemi Nyomda, 1936.
- Jäger-Sunstenau, Hanns: General-Index zu den Siebenmacher'schen Wappenbüchern. 1605–1961, Graz, Akademische Druck- u. Verlagsanstalt, 1964, p. 495.
- László, Markó: A Magyar Állam Főméltóságai. Szent Istvántól Napjainkig. Életrajzi Lexikon, Budapest, Magyar Könyvklub, 2000, p. 292.
- Siebmacher, Johann: Siebmachers Wappenbuch, Bd. IV, Abt. 15, Adel von Ungarn IV. Der Adel von Ungarn sammt den Nebenländern der St. Stephans-Krone, Nürnberg, Verlag von Bauer & Raspe, 1891, Taf. 245.
- Török, Gyöngyi: Matthias Corvinus und die Renaissance in Ungarn, Schallaburg 1982, pg. 92–93.
