= Titel Chapter =

Collegiate chapter in Hungary

The Titel Chapter was a collegiate chapter, established in the late 11th century, in the Kingdom of Hungary. It was dedicated to the Holy Wisdom.

== Establishment ==
Duke Lampert – the younger brother of Ladislaus I of Hungary – established the collegiate chapter at Titel (now in Serbia) between 1077 and 1095. It was dedicated to the Holy Wisdom.

== Sources ==
- Rokay, Péter; Takács, Miklós (1994). "Titel". In Kristó, Gyula; Engel, Pál; Makk, Ferenc (eds.). Korai magyar történeti lexikon (9–14. század) [Encyclopedia of the Early Hungarian History (9th–14th centuries)] (in Hungarian). Akadémiai Kiadó. p. 677. ISBN 963-05-6722-9.
- Györffy, György (1987). Az Árpád-kori Magyarország történeti földrajza, I: Abaújvár, Arad, Árva, Bács, Baranya, Bars, Békés, Bereg, Beszterce, Bihar, Bodrog, Borsod, Brassó, Csanád és Csongrád megye [Historical Geography of Hungary of the Árpáds, Volume I: The Counties of Abaújvár, Arad, Árva, Bács, Baranya, Bars, Békés, Bereg, Beszterce, Bihar, Bodrog, Borsod, Brassó, Csanád and Csongrád] (in Hungarian). Akadémiai Kiadó. ISBN 963-05-4200-5.
- Kiss, Gergely (2013). Királyi egyházak a középkori Magyarországon [Royal Churches in Medieval Hungary] (in Hungarian). Pécsi Történettudományért Kulturális Egyesület. ISBN 978-963-642-442-8.
