= Benedict (bishop of Transylvania) =

Hungarian Dominican friar

- Bishop of Transylvania
- Installed: 24 July 1309
- Term ended: 1319 or 1320
- Predecessor: Peter Monoszló
- Successor: Andrew Szécsi

Orders
- Consecration: 2 July 1310 by Gentile Portino da Montefiore

Personal details
- Died: before January 1320
- Denomination: Roman Catholic

Benedict (Hungarian: Benedek; died late 1319 or early 1320) was a Hungarian Dominican friar and prelate at the turn of the 13th and 14th centuries, who served as Bishop of Transylvania from 1309 until his death.

== Early life ==
Benedict joined the Dominican Order at his young age, as a result contemporary documents styled him as "frater" throughout his whole life. His parentage is unknown. A papal document emphasizes his skills and literacy in science and theology. It is possible, he is identical with that lector Benedict, who appears in a source in 1295. Later, he elevated into the position of prior of the Dominican monastery in Gyulafehérvár (present-day Alba Iulia, Romania). In this capacity, he was an adviser and confidant ("amicus ac consiliarius") of the influential prelate, Peter Monoszló, who served as Bishop of Transylvania from the 1270s. Thereafter, he was transferred to the Dominican monastery of the Assumption of the Blessed Virgin Mary at Buda Island, where he functioned as prior too.

== Episcopate ==
=== Controversial election ===
After a long-standing 37-year of episcopal reign, Peter Monoszló died on 27 November 1307. At the last decade of his life, the elderly bishop maintained a cooperative relationship with the powerful voivode Ladislaus Kán, who ruled the province de facto independently of the central royal authority, and thus he was considered one of the so-called "oligarchs" at the turn of the 13th and 14th centuries. Consequently, the death of Peter Monoszló proved to be a good opportunity for Ladislaus Kán to extend his direct influence over the ecclesiastical affairs and properties in Transylvania. According to the accusations, the powerful lord confiscated the church benefices and filled the number of canons of the cathedral chapter with his loyal laymen. Moreover, Ladislaus Kán also demanded that one of his sons be elected as the new bishop of Transylvania. Several canons were hiding in various Dominican and Augustinian monasteries throughout the province in order to prevent the realization of his intentions. The voivode, however, captured and persuaded them to participate in the election process took place on 7 January 1308, in accordance with the canon law; other elderly canons were imprisoned temporarily. Disrupting the canons' right of free election, Ladislaus Kán appeared and chaired in person at the assembly and prevented the formation of a voting committee. The voivode declared that his son to be postulated formally and read the "new bishop's" inaugural diploma, persuading the intimidated clergymen to confirm the result with their seals.

The cathedral chapter, through their representative Peter of Paris, filed suit in the court of papal legate Gentile Portino da Montefiore regarding the oligarch's methods against the bishopric. The cardinal commissioned auditors general Filip de Sardinea and Johannes de Aretio to investigate the case. In July 1309, Ladislaus Kán – realizing its untenability – declared that he would not maintain his son's claim to the bishopric, but he suggested two new candidates to the canons: Augustinian friar Peter or Dominican friar Benedict, both of them were considered his confidants. The voivode emphasized he is willing to return the occupied church lands to the diocese, if the cathedral chapter elect his nominated candidates either. On 24 July 1309, the threatened canons were yielding to extortion and "unanimously" elected Benedict as the new Bishop of Transylvania on the recommendation of Benedict, archdeacon of Ózd in order to the "immediate elimination of dangerous ordeals". During the second lawsuit, the archdeacon, acted as lawyer of the cathedral chapter, argued that Benedict was a suitable candidate as he enjoyed the support of Ladislaus Kán, while as a former local prior and as a friend and councilor of the late Peter Monoszló, was aware of local conditions.

Benedict stayed in Buda, when he was informed on his election as bishop by canons Nicholas and Peter of Paris. He received the permission of Paul, Prior Provincial of Hungary to transfer him to Transylvania on 17 August; his superior also requested Gentile to confirm Benedict's election. According to the rules of the Dominicans, Benedict had to suspend his affiliation to the order after he nominally took the office. Benedict himself also requested the papal legate to confirm his election as "finally, a regular election took place to restore peace after the long threat had ended". However, only 15 of 24 members of the cathedral chapter took part in the election process. The remaining nine canons opposed Benedict's forced candidacy and one of them, John, provost of Székesfehérvár protested against the election to the judicial court of Gentile in late August 1309, which resulted launching a second lawsuit on 1 September 1309 with the mandates of Filip de Sardinea and Johannes de Aretio. The plaintiff formulated three charges: he argued the date of election exceeded the three-month deadline after the death of the previous suffragan; the election of Benedict was hastened by cantor Thomas and his followers, who were excommunicated for their previous infringements; while the cathedral chapter itself did not fulfill its share in servitium commune, the sustenance of papal legate Gentile's court. As a result, John considered, the right of appointment of a new bishop returned to the competency of the Holy See. Because of the lawsuit, Benedict was forbidden to travel to his episcopal see and diocese without the permission of the papal legate.

Provost John declared in October 1309 that he is no longer opposing the election of Benedict. Despite that, the lawsuit continued throughout the year. The cathedral chapter nominated Benedict, archdeacon of Ózd as their legal representative at the court. The two auditors provided 40 days for Benedict to nominee two truthful witnesses, who will verify the regularity of the electoral process. The cathedral chapter was also granted the same deadline to prove the reason for the delay in the choice (secular interference and intimidation) and their existing right to choice a new suffragan (rejection of accusation of excommunication). The auditors even sent an order to Benedict from cardinal Gentile, who strictly forbade him travel to Transylvania under threat of excommunication. In mid-September 1309, both the seven Saxon deacons and Stephen, prior of the Augustinian friars at Gyulafehérvár confirmed that Ladislaus Kán hindered the orderly election until 1 July 1309. Regarding the second accusation, archdeacon Benedict emphasized that the cathedral chapter was not aware of the ecclesiastical punishments against cantor Thomas and his followers. Annihilating the third accusation, archdeacon Benedict and bishop-elect Benedict presented proof of payment of the chapter in October 1309, which proved the diocese's contribution to financing the operation of Gentile's court.

=== Episcopal activity ===
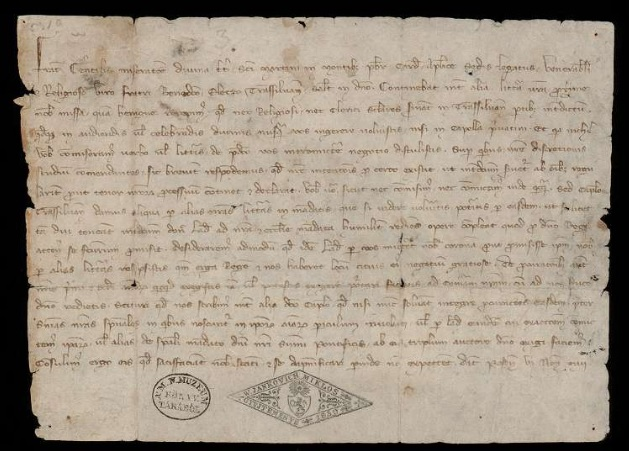
Papal legate Gentile's letter to Benedict in 1310, the earliest surviving document written on paper in Hungary

The controversy over Benedict's election was soon drawn into a political context; Ladislaus Kán seized the Holy Crown since 1307, thus Charles I of Hungary – following years of struggle for the Hungarian throne – was crowned with a temporary crown in June 1309. However, most Hungarians regarded this coronation invalid. Gentile and the Hungarian prelates urged the voivode to hand over the Holy Crown to Charles. According to János Temesváry and Mária Lupescu Makó, bishop-elect Benedict negotiated with Ladislaus Kán on behalf of the papal legate in order to recover the crown jewel in late 1309 or early 1310. According to Sándor Hunyadi, this occurred in the spring of summer of 1309, and the historian identified him with that envoy Benedict, who was captured and imprisoned by Henry Kőszegi's supporters on his way back to home. Hunyadi argues there was a second meeting between Ladislaus Kán and Benedict in early 1310. Consequently, the voivode promised he will send Benedict with the Holy Crown to the court of Gentile, but he delayed fulfillment of his promise. Another meeting with the oligarch took place in April, but without the participation of Benedict. In May 1310, the cardinal emphasized to Benedict that the interdict over Transylvania should be maintained, until Kán is not fulfilling his promise (this letter is also the first surviving paper document from Hungary). It is possible that Benedict himself delivered the Holy Crown to Gentile at Pressburg (present-day Bratislava, Slovakia) on 1 July 1310. As a reward, the papal legate confirmed his election and consecrated him as a bishop in a "public place" on the next day, 2 July. On 27 August 1310, Archbishop Thomas of Esztergom put the Holy Crown on Charles's head in Székesfehérvár; thus, Charles's third coronation was performed in full accordance with customary law. Benedict also took part in the ceremony.

Contrary to the details of his controversial election and its subsequent lawsuits, only fragmented data exist about his decade long episcopal activity. Upon his request, Charles I confirmed and transcribed Ladislaus IV's 1275 donation letter to the Diocese of Transylvania on 20 July 1313. Benedict resided in the royal court for years. He participated in the royal campaign of 1313 against the province of Matthew Csák. He was present at bishops' meeting at Temesvár (present-day Timișoara, Romania) in July 1315. After Charles neglected to reclaim Church property that Matthew Csák had seized by force, the prelates of the realm, including Benedict, made an alliance in Kalocsa in March 1318 against all who would jeopardize their interests. Upon their demand, Charles held a Diet in summer, but refused to confirm the Golden Bull of 1222. The relationship between Ladislaus Kán and Benedict following his election is relatively unknown. It is plausible that, in exchange for recovering the Holy Crown for the royal court, the voivode may have retained the previously forfeited possessions from the cathedral chapter of Transylvania, including the income (tithe) from salt mining.

Throughout his whole episcopate, Benedict was overwhelmed by the burden of paying his arrears regarding the supplies of Gentile's court and his diocese's share, even after the departure and death of the papal legate. The bishopric of Transylvania accumulated large amount of arrears (938,5 marks) over three years until 1310. Benedict paid off some of the debt (520,5 marks) in December 1310. Under threat of penalty, the bishop and his diocese were only able to repay the remaining amount (410 marks) in several installments in the next 7 years. In the fourth and last year of Gentile's mandate in Hungary (1311), the papal legate determined the additional supply costs for the Diocese of Transylvania in a value of 450–500 marks. Benedict objected to the size of the amount and felt injustice on the cardinal's apart, as the much richer Archdiocese of Kalocsa had to pay similar amount. In July 1311, Benedict petitioned to the Holy See. After the death of Gentile in October 1312, his trusted tax collector, a certain Homboth, a burger of Pressburg demanded the collection of the tithe for the legate's staff along with the amount paid. In June 1318, Pope John XXII determined fixed the remaining debt in value of 953 Buda silver marks. Benedict was only willing to pay part of it. Benedict died in late 1319 or early 1320, the papal tax collector Rufinus de Civinio referred to him as a deceased person on 13 January 1320. Benedict was succeeded by Andrew Szécsi still in that year, however three letters of Pope John XXII from 1323 refer to one Franciscan friar Martin as Andrew's immediate predecessor. It is possible Martin was elected by the cathedral chapter shortly after Benedict's death, but he died before his consecration and papal confirmation.

== Sources ==
- Engel, Pál (1996). Magyarország világi archontológiája, 1301–1457, I. [Secular Archontology of Hungary, 1301–1457, Volume I] (in Hungarian). História, MTA Történettudományi Intézete. ISBN 963-8312-44-0.
- Hunyadi, Sándor (2021). "Az erdélyi püspökség és székeskáptalan Kán László vajdasága alatt [The Chapter and the Diocese of Transylvania in the reign of Ladislaus Kán, Voivode of Transylvania]". Belvedere Meridionale (in Hungarian). 33 (1): 19–46. doi:10.14232/belv.2021.1.3. ISSN 1419-0222. S2CID 240538797.
- Kristó, Gyula (1983). "Kán László és Erdély [Ladislaus Kán and Transylvania]". Tanulmányok az Árpád-korról (in Hungarian). Magvető Könyvkiadó. pp. 269–299. ISBN 963-271-890-9.
- Lupescu Makó, Mária (2017). "Benedek, az erdélyi egyházmegye első szerzetespüspöke [Benedict, the First Friar-Bishop of the Diocese of Transylvania]". In Csurgai Horváth, József (ed.). Az első 300 év Magyarországon és Európában. A Domonkos-rend a középkorban (in Hungarian). Alba Civitas Történeti Alapítvány. pp. 277–294. ISBN 978-963-88117-7-6.
- Maléth, Ágnes (2020). A Magyar Királyság és a Szentszék kapcsolata I. Károly korában (1301–1342) [The Relationship of the Hungarian Kingdom and the Holy See in the time of Charles I (1301–1342)] (in Hungarian). Pécsi Tudományegyetem BTK TTI Középkori és Koraújkori Történeti Tanszék. ISBN 978-963-429-500-6.
- Sălăgean, Tudor (2016). Transylvania in the Second Half of the Thirteenth Century: The Rise of the Congregational System. East Central and Eastern Europe in the Middle Ages 450–1450. Vol. 37. Leiden and Boston: Brill. ISBN 978-90-04-24362-0.
- Temesváry, János (1922). Erdély középkori püspökei [Medieval Bishops of Transylvania] (in Hungarian). Minerva Irodalmi és Nyomdai Műintézet.

Catholic Church titles
Preceded by Peter Monoszló	Bishop of Transylvania; 1309–1319/20	Succeeded by Andrew Szécsi
