= John Bogátradvány =

Hungarian cleric

- Provost of Székesfehérvár
- Installed: 1307
- Term ended: 1322
- Predecessor: Thomas
- Successor: Ladislaus
- Other posts: Archdeacon of Küküllő; Vice-chancellor

Personal details
- Died: April/May 1322
- Buried: Székesfehérvár Basilica
- Denomination: Roman Catholic
- Parents: Berke Bogátradvány

John from the kindred Bogátradvány (Hungarian: Bogátradvány nembeli János; died April or May 1322) was a Hungarian cleric in the first decades of the 14th century, who served as archdeacon of Küküllő from around 1300 and – simultaneously – as provost of Székesfehérvár from 1307 until his death. He was also the first vice-chancellor of a unified Hungarian royal court after the years of Interregnum.

== Family and possessions ==
John was born into the ancient gens (clan) Bogátradvány as the son of comes Berke. He had three brothers, Kemény, Andrew and Peter, the count of the Ruthenians of Wrbowrus. In 1317, Nicholas Atyinai (from the gens Aba) donated the estate Konchyan in Slavonia to the brothers, because they played a significant role in the release of him from the captivity of John Kőszegi. For 200 marks, John and his brothers were also granted some surrounding lands once were possessed by Egidius Monoszló, Nicholas' father-in-law. In the next year, the four brothers were granted the lands Medyazow and Batha along the river Hernád (Hornád) from their relatives, Nicholas and Stephen Bogátradvány. John and his brothers were involved in a lawsuit over the estate Bacskó in Zemplén County (today Bačkov, Slovakia) against Emeric Hernádi in 1320. The court ruled that Bacskó belongs to them due to kinship, thus Hernádi, who bought that previously, handed over the estate in exchange for compensation of 36 marks. John and his brothers also possessed Szada in the same county, and were among the patrons of the St. Peter monastery in Szerencs.

== Career ==
=== In Transylvania ===
John is first mentioned as archdeacon of Küküllő in October 1300, when represented the Transylvanian Chapter in a lawsuit. John held the position until his death. His title of magister and his role in the proceedings implies that John studied canon law, and he usually acted as lawyer of the chapter, of which he was also a member. Beside that, John also served as prothonotary (i.e. head) of the chancellery of Ladislaus Kán, Voivode of Transylvania, mentioning in this capacity from 1303 to 1306. Ladislaus Kán was among those oligarchs, who ruled their provinces de facto independently of the royal power during the era of Interregnum (1301–1308/10). John, who possibly joined the Kán's partisans after 1301, reorganized the chancellery of the voivode after the model of the episcopal one, becoming the third most powerful person in the local administration after Ladislaus Kán and vice-voivode Achilles Torockói.

Thereafter, John is referred to as chancellor of the episcopal court of Peter Monoszló, the Bishop of Transylvania from 1306 to 1307. When Ladislaus Kán was reluctant to recognize the rule of Charles, whose claim had been supported by the Catholic Church, Pope Clement V ordered his excommunication in October 1306, but Peter Monoszló disagreed with that step and expressed his displeasure. According to Romanian historian Tudor Sălăgean, the elderly Peter lost effective control over the diocese by 1306, and Kán's loyal clergyman, John Bogátradvány took control in Gyulafehérvár (today Alba Iulia, Romania) and he issued the aforementioned charter in the name of the prelate. Sălăgean argued that the tangible cooperative relationship between Peter Monoszló and Ladislaus Kán in this period was influenced by John, who managed the diocese's affairs as the confidant of the oligarch. John handed in the appeal of Peter to the Dominican prior in Gyulafehérvár; he probably acted on his own, still, his influence on the bishop appears to be decisive as of that moment, as Sălăgean claimed. By the summer of 1307, John was already styled as "locum tenens" (i.e. administrator) of the diocese. Sălăgean considered that John plausibly obtained preliminary approval from the canons with respect to his designation as the next bishop of Transylvania, succeeding Peter Monoszló, whose health had deteriorated significantly by then. Nevertheless, when Peter died in November 1307, Ladislaus Kán picked one his sons as his successor.

According to Tudor Sălăgean this step prompted John to fled the oligarch's allegiance and swore loyalty to Charles I, who by then remained the sole monarch in Hungary. In contrast to Sălăgean's theory, Hungarian historian Sándor Hunyadi rejected that John would have been the voivode's loyal man at any time, since the chapter would not have tolerated Ladislaus Kán taking control of the diocese through his confidant. Hunyadi argued that John served both the bishop and the voivode, between whom the cooperation took place without any external pressure. This fact is also reflected by John's future career in the royal court, as Hunyadi considered.

=== Royal service ===
John was elected provost of Székesfehérvár by 26 August 1307. Concurrently, he was made vice-chancellor of the royal court of Charles I, becoming the first undisputed such official after the years of the Interregnum. Upon the request of Charles I of Hungary and Charles II of Naples (the Hungarian king's grandfather), Pope Clement V permitted John in August 1309 to hold the positions of provost of Székesfehérvár and archdeacon of Küküllő simultaneously. The pope confirmed his election as provost on this occasion, Later, in July 1317, Pope John XXII also contributed to the dual tenure upon the request of Charles I and for the intercession of Peter, Bishop-elect of Bosnia and Ladislaus Jánki, both were Charles' envoys at the papal court in Avignon. The pope appointed prelates Thomas of Esztergom, Ladislaus Kórógyi of Pécs and Ladislaus Jánki of Kalocsa to execute the papal verdict regarding John's case in July 1318. In addition to these offices, John was also a canon of Esztergom, at least from 1309 to 1317.

On 17 August 1309, majority of the canons elected Benedict, initially Ladislaus Kán's confidant, as the bishop of Transylvania, but John Bogátradvány protested against the election to the judicial court of papal legate Gentile Portino da Montefiore in late August 1309, which resulted launching a second lawsuit on 1 September 1309 with the mandates of Filip de Sardinea and Johannes de Aretio. The plaintiff John formulated three charges: he argued the date of election exceeded the three-month deadline after the death of the previous suffragan; the election of Benedict was hastened by cantor Thomas and his followers, who were excommunicated for their previous infringements; while the cathedral chapter itself did not fulfill its share in servitium commune, the sustenance of papal legate Gentile's court. As a result, John considered, the right of appointment of a new bishop returned to the competency of the Holy See. Because of the lawsuit, Benedict was forbidden to travel to his episcopal see and diocese without the permission of the papal legate. Following negotiations with the representatives of the Transylvanian Chapter, John declared in October 1309 that he is no longer opposing the election of Benedict. Despite that, the lawsuit continued throughout the year.

John attended the national synod of Kalocsa in the spring of 1318, where the Hungarian prelates made an alliance against all who would jeopardize their interests. Pope John XXII appointed him, alongside Augustin Kažotić, Bishop of Zagreb and Nicholas III, Abbot of Pannonhalma, as conservator (guardian) of the Archdiocese of Esztergom and its metropolitan Boleslaus in December 1321. John last appears as a living person in April 1322. He died by the next month, when Ladislaus succeeded him as provost and vice-chancellor. John Bogátradvány was buried in the Székesfehérvár Basilica.

== Sources ==
- Engel, Pál (1987). "Temetkezések a középkori székesfehérvári bazilikában [Burials in the Medieval Basilica of Székesfehérvár]". Századok (in Hungarian). 121 (4). Magyar Történelmi Társulat: 613–637. ISSN 0039-8098.
- Engel, Pál (1996). Magyarország világi archontológiája, 1301–1457, I [Secular Archontology of Hungary, 1301–1457, Volume I] (in Hungarian). História, MTA Történettudományi Intézete. ISBN 963-8312-44-0.
- Hegyi, Géza (2019). "Az erdélyi káptalan Árpád- és Anjou-kori archontológiája (1199–1387) [The Archontology of the Transylvanian Chapter in the Age of Árpáds and Angevins (1199–1387)]". Turul (in Hungarian). 92 (2). Magyar Heraldikai és Genealógiai Társaság: 69–94. ISSN 1216-7258.
- Hunyadi, Sándor (2021). "Az erdélyi püspökség és székeskáptalan Kán László vajdasága alatt [The Chapter and the Diocese of Transylvania in the reign of Ladislaus Kán, Voivode of Transylvania]". Belvedere Meridionale (in Hungarian). 33 (1): 19–46. ISSN 1419-0222.
- Maléth, Ágnes (2020). A Magyar Királyság és a Szentszék kapcsolata I. Károly korában (1301–1342) [The Relationship of the Hungarian Kingdom and the Holy See in the time of Charles I (1301–1342)] (in Hungarian). Pécsi Tudományegyetem BTK TTI Középkori és Koraújkori Történeti Tanszék. ISBN 978-963-429-500-6.
- Ribi, András (2018). "A fehérvári káptalan archontológiája (1301–1457) [The Archontology of the Székesfehérvár Chapter (1301–1457)]". Turul (in Hungarian). 91 (4). Magyar Heraldikai és Genealógiai Társaság: 132–154. ISSN 1216-7258.
- Sălăgean, Tudor (2016). Transylvania in the Second Half of the Thirteenth Century: The Rise of the Congregational System. East Central and Eastern Europe in the Middle Ages 450–1450. Vol. 37. Leiden and Boston: Brill. ISBN 978-90-04-24362-0.

John Genus Bogátradvány Born: ? Died: April/May 1322
Catholic Church titles
Preceded by Thomas	Provost of Székesfehérvár; 1307–1322	Succeeded by Ladislaus
Political offices
Preceded by Stephen for Charles I	Vice-chancellor; 1307–1322	Succeeded by Ladislaus
Preceded by Stephen for Wenceslaus	Vice-chancellor; 1307–1322	Succeeded by Ladislaus
Preceded by Nicholas Kőszegi for Otto	Vice-chancellor; 1307–1322	Succeeded by Ladislaus
