= Sâniacob =

Sâniacob may refer to several villages in Romania:

- Sâniacob, a village in Lechința Commune, Bistrița-Năsăud County
- Sâniacob, a village in Ațintiș Commune, Mureș County
