= Conservator =

Conservator (female Conservatrix) may refer to:

- Conservator of a conservatorship, U.S. court appointee to supervise financial affairs
- Conservator (religion), to protect certain legal persons
- Conservator-restorer, of objects of cultural heritage
- Conservators who manage areas of countryside in England
- Where transformer oil is stored
- The Conservator, 19th Century Chicago journal co-founded by Ferdinand Lee Barnett
