= Gambut =

Gambut may refer to:

- Gâmbuț, a village in Bichiș Commune, Mureș County, Romania
- Gambut, or Kambut, a village in eastern Libya
  - RAF Gambut, an abandoned air force base
