= Thomas II (archbishop of Esztergom) =

Hungarian prelate

Thomas
- Archbishop of Esztergom
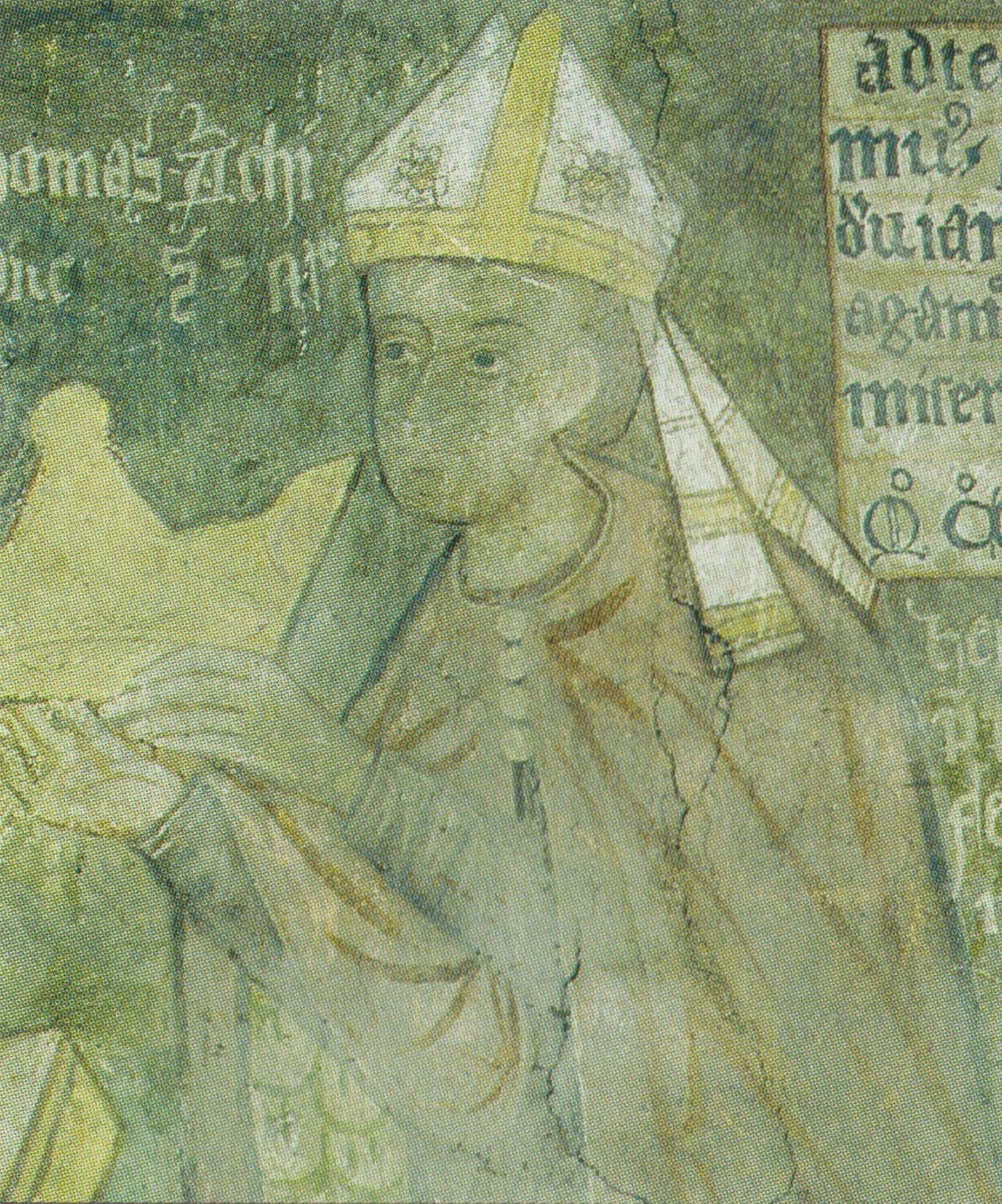
- Contemporary depiction of Thomas in the St Martin's Cathedral in Spišská Kapitula
- Installed: 1305
- Term ended: 1321
- Predecessor: Michael Bő
- Successor: Boleslaus
- Other post: Provost of Székesfehérvár

Personal details
- Died: 1321 Esztergom (?)
- Denomination: Roman Catholic
- Education: University of Padua

Thomas (Hungarian: Tamás; fl. 1291 – died 1321) was a prelate in the Kingdom of Hungary in the first half of the 14th century. He was Archbishop of Esztergom between 1305 and 1321. He was a confidant of Charles I of Hungary, whom he has supported in his unification war against the provincial lords. He crowned Charles twice, in June 1309 and August 1310.

== Early career ==
Thomas was born into an illustrious family. His maternal uncle was Lodomer, the Archbishop of Esztergom from 1279 to 1298, who was a loyal supporter of Andrew III of Hungary. Due to his uncle's influence and intervention, by 1291, Thomas elevated into the provostry of Szenttamás (lit. "Saint Thomas" after Thomas Becket), which laid nearby Esztergom. Thereafter Lodomer sent his nephew to the University of Padua to learn canon law and theology. Thomas already resided in Padua on 3 June 1291, according to a university record. There he obtained the title of magister. Returning home in 1293, he was appointed grand provost of Esztergom, holding the dignity at least until 1303. Following Lodomer's death in January 1298, Thomas became an advocate of the claim of Charles of Anjou to the Hungarian throne. At the turn of 1301 and 1302, papal legate Niccolò Boccasini sent Thomas to the Kingdom of Bohemia to negotiate with King Wenceslaus II, father of Wenceslaus, Charles' rival.

He was sent to Rome in early 1303, alongside other prelates with the leadership of Stephen, the Archbishop of Kalocsa, to represent the interests of Charles against the rival claimant Wenceslaus. As a result, Pope Boniface VIII, who regarded Hungary as a fief of the Holy See, declared Charles the lawful king of Hungary on 31 May 1303, and also threatened Wenceslaus with excommunication if he continued to style himself king of Hungary. Following the death of Gregory Bicskei, Thomas was elected provost of Székesfehérvár in the first half of 1304. He first appears in this capacity in a royal charter on 12 June 1304.

== Archbishop ==
=== Charles' partisan ===
In the summer of 1304, the Bohemian army invaded Upper Hungary and encamped at Párkány (present-day Štúrovo in Slovakia). There Wenceslaus II of Bohemia called upon Archbishop Michael Bő to crown his namesake son as king, but he refused the threat. Following that the Bohemian troops stormed Esztergom and looted its treasury, in addition to the destruction of diplomas and holy relics. Michael fled his archbishopric seat for Pressburg (today Bratislava, Slovakia), where he died soon around September. The negotiations with the local lords convinced Wenceslaus II that his son's position in Hungary had dramatically weakened. Accordingly, he decided to take his son back to Bohemia, who did not renounce Hungary and made Ivan Kőszegi governor before leaving for Bohemia in August. He even took the Holy Crown of Hungary with himself to Prague. Thereafter Esztergom was held by the Kőszegi troops. Residing in Székesfehérvár, the cathedral chapter of Esztergom elected Thomas as their new archbishop-in-exile sometimes before 17 February 1305. He also bore the title of perpetual count of Esztergom County, restoring the dignity for the archbishopric after five years. According to a document, Thomas only recently returned to Hungary from his visit to the papal court, which reinforces the assumption that his election was a mere formality and was appointed to office by Pope Clement V himself. vThomas excommunicated the Kőszegi brothers – Ivan and Henry – for their crimes against the burghers of Esztergom in July 1305. Wenceslaus who had succeeded his father in Bohemia renounced his claim to Hungary in favor of Otto III, Duke of Bavaria on 9 October 1305. Thomas unsuccessfully attempt to prevent his coronation with the Holy Crown in Székesfehérvár on 6 December 1305, which was performed by two bishops, although customary law authorized the Archbishop of Esztergom to perform the ceremony. Thereafter Thomas proclaimed the excommunication of Otto's followers, while Pope Clement V declared the invalidity of the coronation.

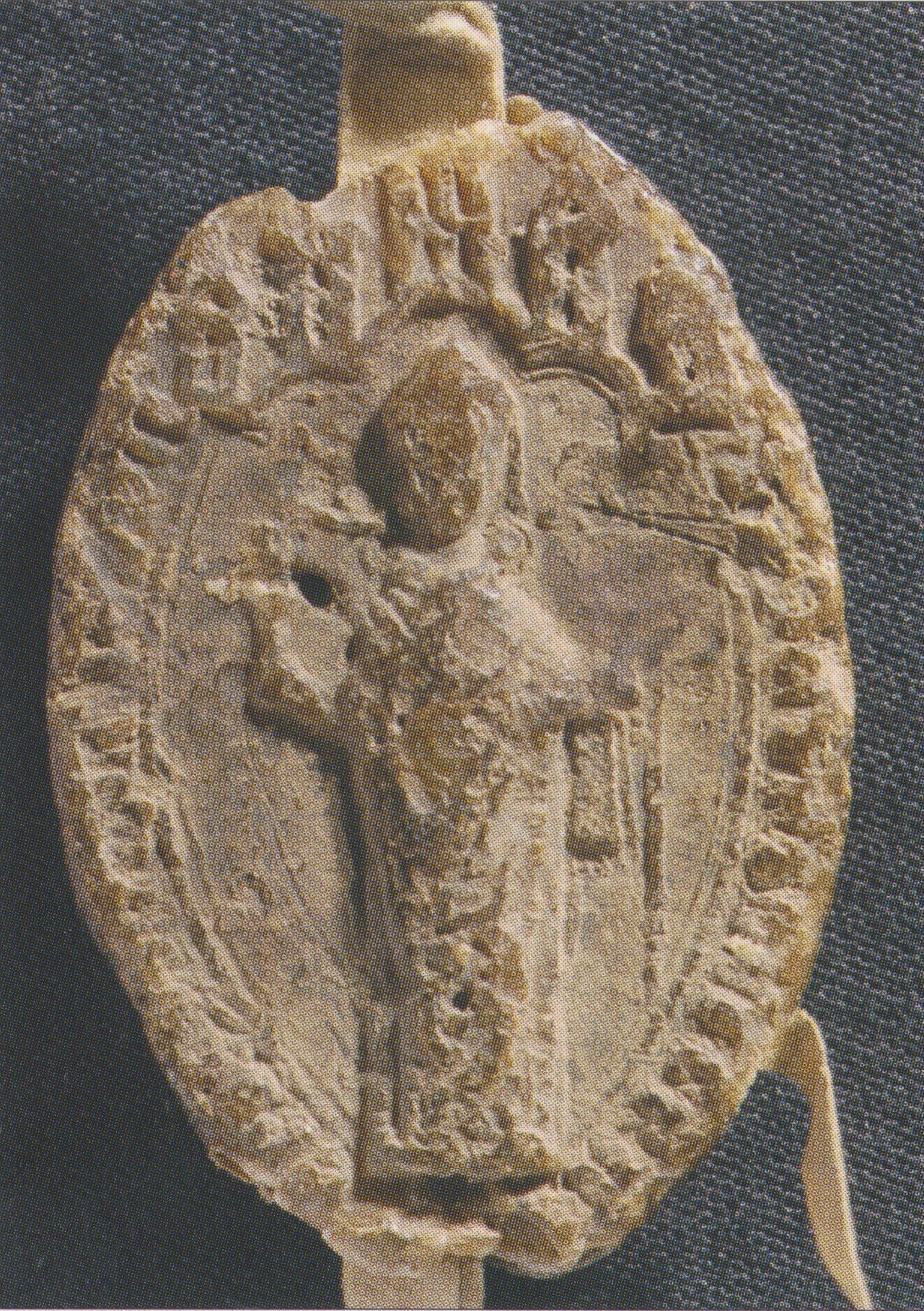
1307 seal of Thomas

Pope Clement confirmed Thomas' election and sent his pallium on 31 January 1306. Prior to this, Thomas borrowed a lot of money to achieve this goal. According to his promissory note (obligatio) from February 1306, he had to pay 2,000 golden florins as his servitium commune and ten servitia minuta to the Roman Curia. Thomas paid 50 golden florins as part of his servitium commune in 1309. Otto was never able to strengthen his position in Hungary, because only the Kőszegis supported him. Accompanying with Thomas and his troops, Charles seized Esztergom and many fortresses in the northern parts of Hungary (now in Slovakia) in the autumn of 1306. Thomas marched into his emptied seat with his army, which has been plundered and destroyed in recent years. Thomas appointed Peter as Bishop of Pécs at the end of 1306 after the canons did not reach a consensus. However the local oligarch Henry Kőszegi's protege cantor Nicholas contested the appointment and usurped the position and its revenues. Thomas excommunicated the cantor from the church in 1307. Thomas borrowed money in 1307 to repair the cathedral, but renovation works lasted for decades, surpassing his archiepiscopal tenure. Thomas convoked a provincial synod to Udvard, Komárom County (present-day Dvory nad Žitavou, Slovakia) in May 1307. There, he renewed the excommunication of those barons, clergymen and towns, who did not acknowledge Charles as their king. Thomas called all the subjects of the realm to obey the king's commandments, otherwise he was ready to place the whole kingdom under interdict and launch a crusade against the treacherous barons. After Charles' partisans occupied Buda in June 1307, Thomas captured and imprisoned those local pro-Wenceslaus clergymen, who even excommunicated Pope Benedict XI prior to that. The priests died in his prison, according to the Illuminated Chronicle. An assembly of Charles' partisans confirmed Charles' claim to the throne on 10 October 1307, and authorized archbishops Thomas and Vincent to excommunicate those who raise objections to the decision. Meanwhile, Pope Clement also ordered the two archbishops to summon Anthony, Bishop of Csanád before the papal curia, because of his involvement in the coronation of Otto, and to proclaim the papal judgment that Charles is the rightful Hungarian king. Pope Clement V sent his papal legate, Gentile Portino da Montefiore, to Hungary. Charles I and Thomas welcomed him in Zagreb, when he arrived in the summer of 1308. Thomas contributed to the costs of the legate's activities with 431 Buda marks until the autumn of 1311 (the expected amount was 603 marks).

Thomas was present, when Gentile negotiated with the most powerful oligarch Matthew Csák in the Pauline Monastery of Kékes on 10 November 1308. The archbishop presided that general diet in the presence of Gentile in the Dominican monastery of Pest on 27 November 1308, which elected Charles king. Gentile and Thomas convoked the synod of the Hungarian prelates, who declared the monarch inviolable in December 1308. In preparation for the coronation, they also urged the Transylvanian oligarch Ladislaus Kán, who captured Otto, to hand over the Holy Crown to Charles, but he refused to do so. As a result, Thomas crowned Charles king with a newly prepared and consecrated crown in the Church of Our Lady in Buda on 15 or 16 June 1309. However, most Hungarians regarded the ceremony invalid. After that Gentile excommunicated Ladislaus Kán. Thereafter Thomas, alongside Amadeus Aba and Dominic Rátót, negotiated with the voivode in Szeged on 8 April 1310, on the conditions of return of the crown. Ladislaus Kán finally agreed to give the Holy Crown to Charles. On 27 August 1310, Archbishop Thomas put the Holy Crown on Charles' head in Székesfehérvár; thus, Charles' third coronation was performed in full accordance with customary law.

=== Unification war ===
Despite his valid coronation, Charles' rule remained nominal in most parts of his kingdom. For instance, Matthew Csák continued to expand the borders of his domains and occupied several castles in the northern part of the kingdom. He surprisingly laid siege Buda in June 1311, then Charles sent an army to invade Matthew Csák's domains in September, but it achieved nothing. Thereafter the oligarch constantly pillaged the possessions of the Archdiocese of Esztergom. One of its castles, Berzence (present-day Tekovská Breznica, Slovakia) was seized and destroyed by digging a tunnel under the castle walls in late 1311. Matthew Csák caused a damage of 15,000 marks to the archdiocese during these attacks. The oligarch threatened to besiege Esztergom in the spring of 1312; as Charles I dealt with the neutralization of the Aba dominion, Thomas was forced to ask for peace from Matthew and abandoned most of the claims for damages in early March. Meanwhile, Thomas was also active in the case of the Aba dominion: after the burghers of Kassa (now Košice in Slovakia) assassinated Amadeus Aba in September 1311, Charles sent his two envoys, Thomas and Stephen Kéki to the province, where they arbitrated an agreement between Amadeus' widow and sons and the town, which also prescribed that the Abas withdraw from two counties and allow the noblemen inhabiting their domains to freely join Charles. Thereafter Thomas resided in Lőcse (today Levoča, Slovakia) until January 1312, where he negotiated with the Abas about the transfer of three castles in Szepesség (Spiš) region. However, the Abas soon entered into an alliance with Matthew Csák against the king. Alongside other lords and prelates, Thomas participated with his banderium in the royal campaign, which consisted of successful sieges and the decisive Battle of Rozgony in the summer of 1312. Thomas was also present, when Charles' army captured Nagyszombat (today Trnava, Slovakia) from Matthew Csák in early 1313. There lying on his deathbed, an elderly baron and soldier Egidius Monoszló made his final testament at the local Franciscan friary, and Thomas presented the document on 11 March. At the turn of 1311 and 1312, Thomas refused to confirm the election of Nicholas, the provost of Dömös as the new Bishop of Vác, alleging procedural irregularities. The king, as the patron of the Diocese of Vác, also protested against the person of Nicholas. Pope Clement instructed Thomas to suspend the provost from office and summon him before the Roman Curia. Thomas also took part in the 1317 war against Matthew Csák. After the capture of Komárom (now Komárno in Slovakia) on 3 November 1317, Charles concluded a short-lived peace with the oligarch. One of the proofs of this is that Thomas issued a charter in Tapolcsány (present-day Topoľčany, Slovakia), the ancient land of the Csáks in August 1318.

However, Thomas strongly opposed the peace with Matthew Csák. After Charles neglected to reclaim Church property that Matthew Csák had seized by force, the prelates of the realm – archbishops Thomas, Ladislaus Jánki and their eleven suffragans – made an alliance in early 1318 against all who would jeopardize their interests. Upon their demand, Charles held a Diet in summer, but refused to confirm the Golden Bull of 1222. Before the end of the year, the prelates made a complaint against Charles because he had taken possession of Church property. Thomas acted as conservator of the Dominican nuns of Rabbits' Island in 1319 and 1320, defending their interests in various lawsuits. Despite the disagreements, Thomas remained a strong pillar of Charles' reign until his death in the first half of 1321. A wall-painting from 1317 in St Martin's Cathedral in Spišská Kapitula (Hungarian: Szepeshely) depicts the 1310 coronation of Charles, including the figure of Thomas with the Holy Crown, alongside Charles I, Thomas Semsei (or Philip Drugeth) and Henry, Provost of Szepes. Following his death, Nanker, the Bishop of Kraków complained to the Holy See in 1324 that Thomas and his successor Boleslaus, exercised unjustifiably ecclesiastical authority over the Catholic communities of Podolin, Gnézda and Lubló (present-day Podolínec, Hniezdne and Stará Ľubovňa in Slovakia, respectively), even though they belonged to the diocese of Kraków, as he claimed.

== Sources ==
- Beke, Margit (2003). "II. Tamás [Thomas II]". In Beke, Margit (ed.). Esztergomi érsekek 1001–2003 [Archbishops of Esztergom 1001–2003] (in Hungarian). Szent István Társulat. pp. 145–151. ISBN 963-361-472-4.
- Engel, Pál (1988). "Az ország újraegyesítése. I. Károly küzdelmei az oligarchák ellen (1310–1323) [Reunification of the Realm. The Struggles of Charles I Against the Oligarchs (1310–1323)]". Századok (in Hungarian). 122 (1–2). Magyar Történelmi Társulat: 89–146. ISSN 0039-8098.
- Engel, Pál (1996). Magyarország világi archontológiája, 1301–1457, I. [Secular Archontology of Hungary, 1301–1457, Volume I] (in Hungarian). História, MTA Történettudományi Intézete. ISBN 963-8312-44-0.
- Kádár, Tamás (2017). "Harcban a koronáért. (II.) I. Károly (Róbert) király uralkodásának 1306–1310 közötti szakasza [Fight for the Crown. The Reign of Charles I (Robert) from 1306 to 1310]". Történeti Tanulmányok. Acta Universitatis Debreceniensis (in Hungarian). 25: 126–192. ISSN 1217-4602.
- Maléth, Ágnes (2020). A Magyar Királyság és a Szentszék kapcsolata I. Károly korában (1301–1342) [The Relationship of the Hungarian Kingdom and the Holy See in the time of Charles I (1301–1342)] (in Hungarian). Pécsi Tudományegyetem BTK TTI Középkori és Koraújkori Történeti Tanszék. ISBN 978-963-429-500-6.
- Solymosi, László; Körmendi, Adrienne (1981). "A középkori magyar állam virágzása és bukása, 1301–1506 [The Heyday and Fall of the Medieval Hungarian State, 1301–1526]". In Solymosi, László (ed.). Magyarország történeti kronológiája, I: a kezdetektől 1526-ig [Historical Chronology of Hungary, Volume I: From the Beginning to 1526] (in Hungarian). Akadémiai Kiadó. pp. 188–228. ISBN 963-05-2661-1.

Catholic Church titles
Preceded by Gregory Bicskei (elected)	Provost of Székesfehérvár; 1304–1305	Succeeded by John Bogátradvány
Preceded by Michael Bő	Archbishop of Esztergom; 1305–1321	Succeeded by Boleslaus
