= San Martino Chapel =

Chapel, in San Marco Church, Umbria, Italy

Coordinates: 43°04′29″N 12°36′20″E

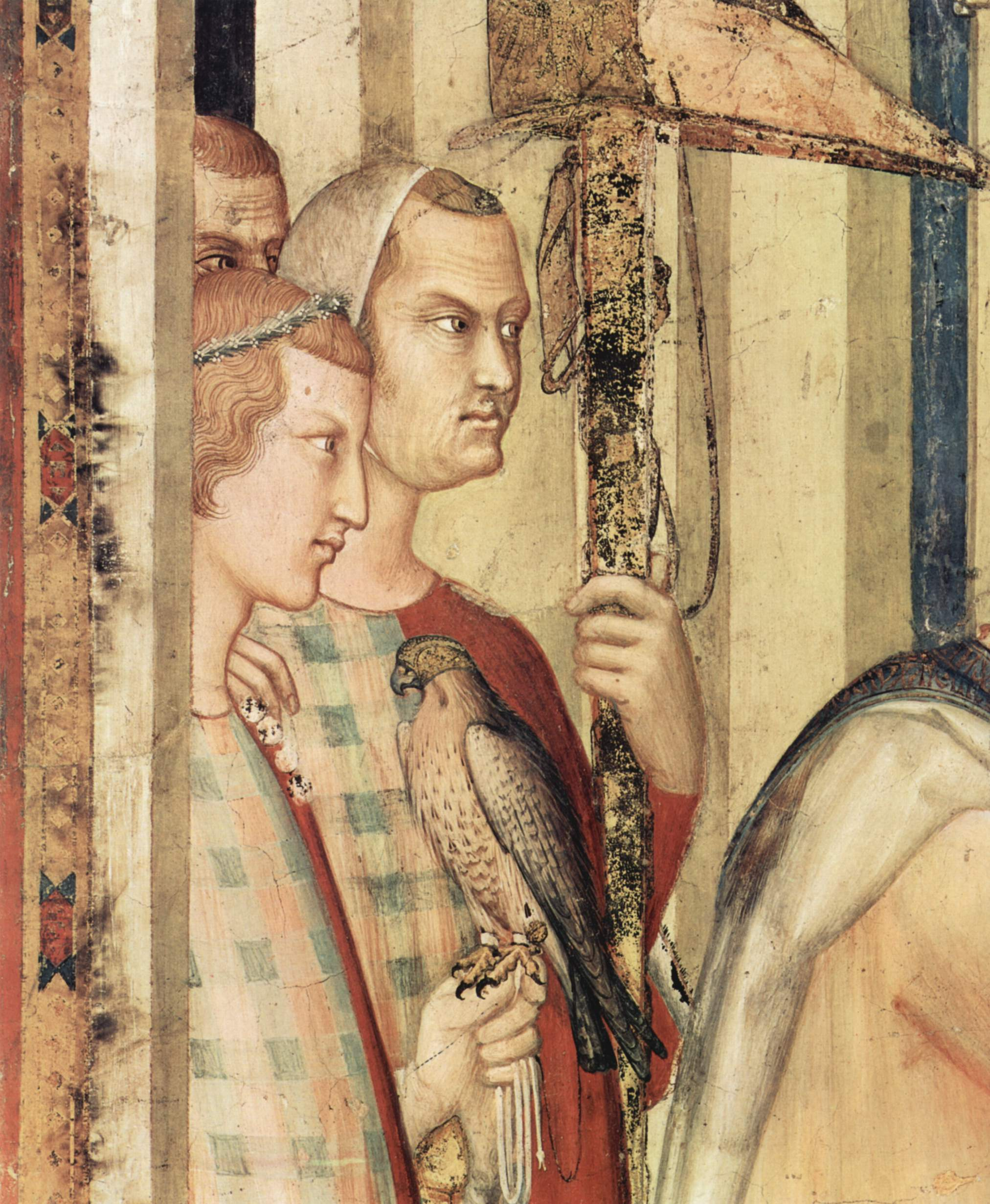
Detail of the Investiture of St. Martin as a Knight.

San Martino Chapel (Italian: Cappella di san Martino) is a chapel in the Lower Basilica of San Francesco in Assisi, Umbria, central Italy. Commissioned and funded by Cardinal Gentile Portino da Montefiore, it features a cycle of frescoes by Simone Martini (1313–1318), portraying the life of Saint Martin of Tours in 4th-century France.

The frescoes are neither dated nor signed, but art historians tend to agree in identifying Martini as their author, based on stylistic and historical reasons.

== History ==
Gentile Portino da Montefiore was the Cardinal of the Basilica of Santi Silvestro e Martino ai Monti in Rome. A document dating to March 1312 testifies to the funding by the Cardinal of 600 golden florins for the construction and fresco decoration of a chapel in the Lower Basilica of San Francesco in Assisi. According to recent hypotheses, the unnamed sculptor-architect who built and decorated this chapel was also responsible for creating the monumental tomb of Gentile Portino's parents in Montefiore dell'Aso (Ascoli Piceno). In the spring of the same year, the Cardinal is known to have been in Siena, while transferring the papal treasure to Avignon. Here he likely made an agreement with Simone Martini to paint the chapel. In the following October, the cardinal died at Lucca, without arriving in Avignon.

Martini worked in the chapel in at least three phases. He started the works in 1312–1313, leaving his work on the unfinished Maestà of the Palazzo Pubblico of Siena. In this first period, he designed the stained glass and perhaps began the frescoes. He returned to Siena around 1314 to finish the Maestà. He was back to Assisi in June 1315, starting the second decoration phase. In 1317, he was called to Naples by King Robert I of Anjou, but returned to Umbria soon to complete (and, in some cases, rework) the saints under the entrance arch. The work was finished around 1318.

== Description ==
The side chapels show ten frescoes on the life of St. Martin, bishop of Tours. The scenes include:

- St. Martin Sharing the Mantle with a Beggar
- Apparition of Christ and Angels in St. Martin's Dream
- Investiture of St. Martin as Knight
- Renounce of St. Martin to the Weapons
- Visit to the Emperor with Burning Throne
- Resurrection of a Youth
- Miraculous Mass
- The Dream of St. Ambrose
- Death of St. Martin
- Funerals of St. Martin

Above the entrance arch is the dedication from Cardinal da Montefiore to St. Martin, while the windows are decorated with busts of Saint Knights (left), Saint Bishops or Popes (center), and Saint Hermits or Founders of Religious Orders (right). The eight saints under the entrance arch are St. Mary Magdalene and St. Catherine of Alexandria (lower right), St. Anthony of Padua and St. Francis (upper right), St. Clare and St. Elizabeth of Hungary (lower left), St. Louis of France and St. Louis of Toulouse (upper left). The three latter saints replaced, respectively, the previous St. Ursula, St. Nicholas of Bari and St. Antony of Padua, after Martini had returned from the Kingdom of Naples, as a homage to the family saints of the ruling Capetian House of Anjou.

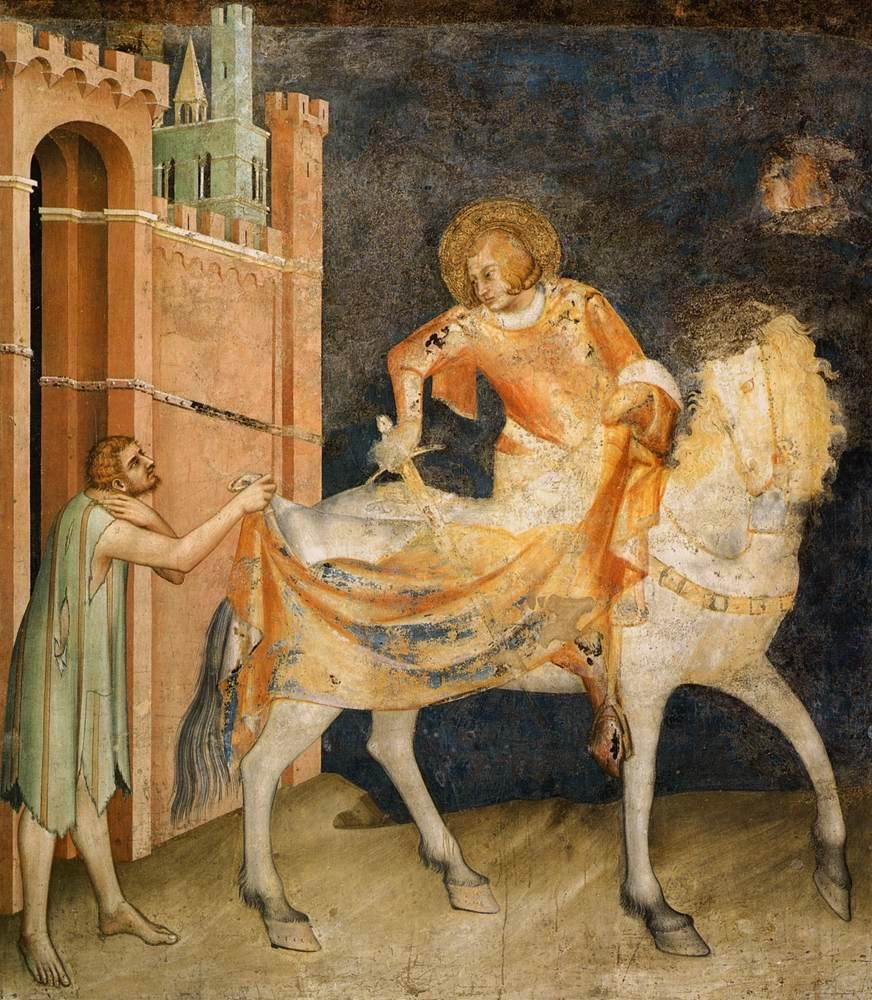
St. Martin Sharing the Mantle with a Beggar

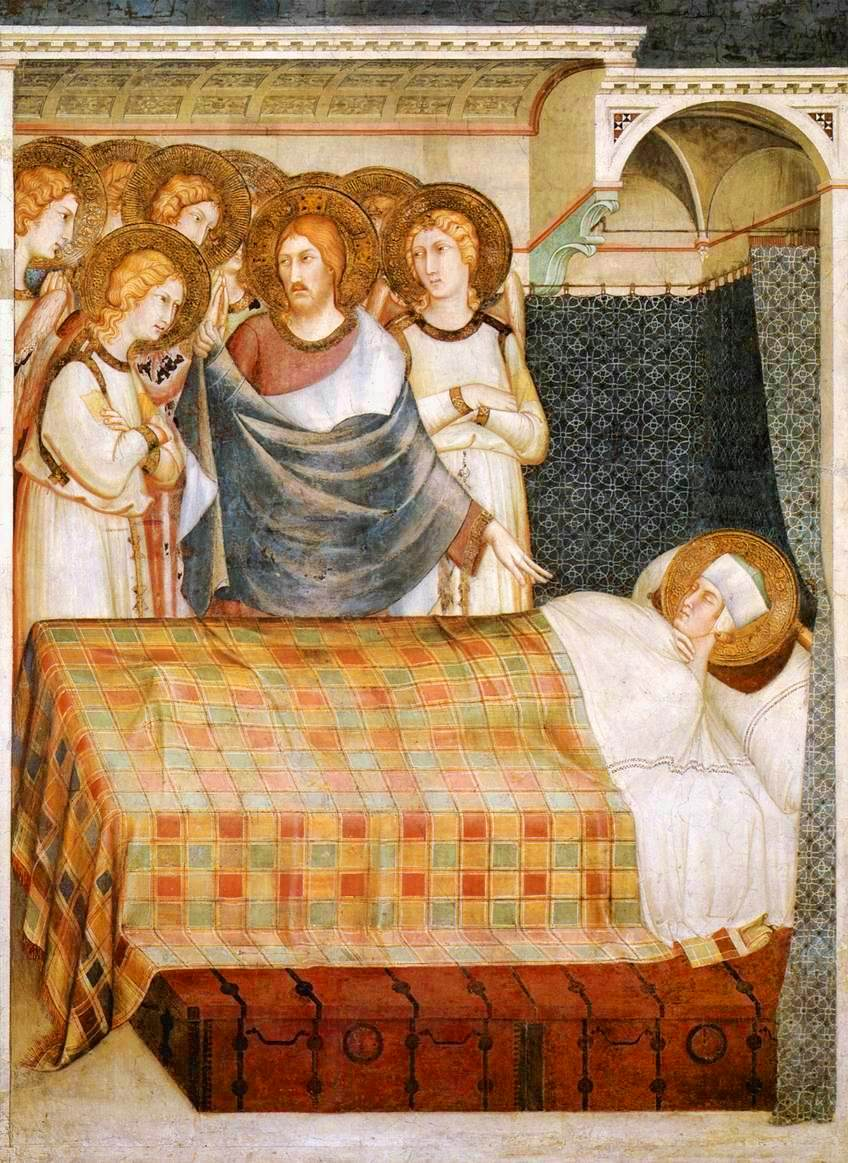
Apparition of Christ and Angels in St. Martin's Dream

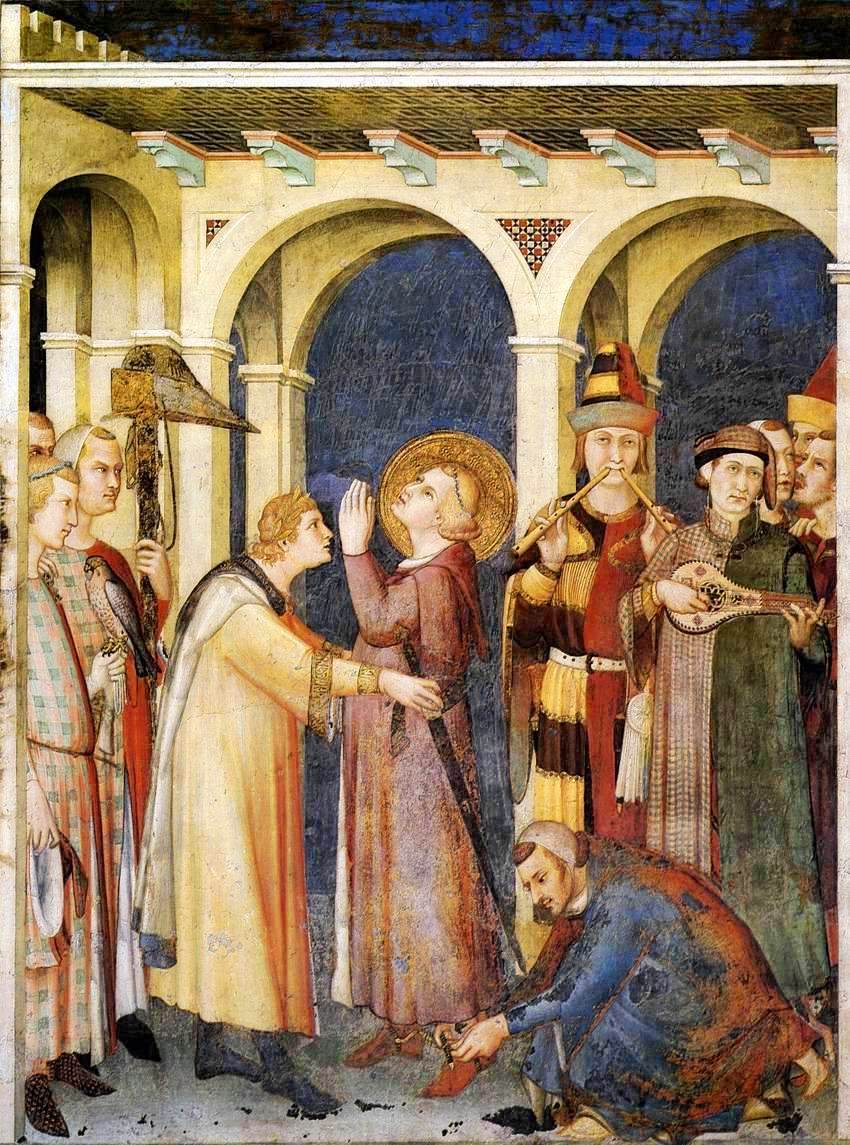
Investiture of St. Martin as Knight

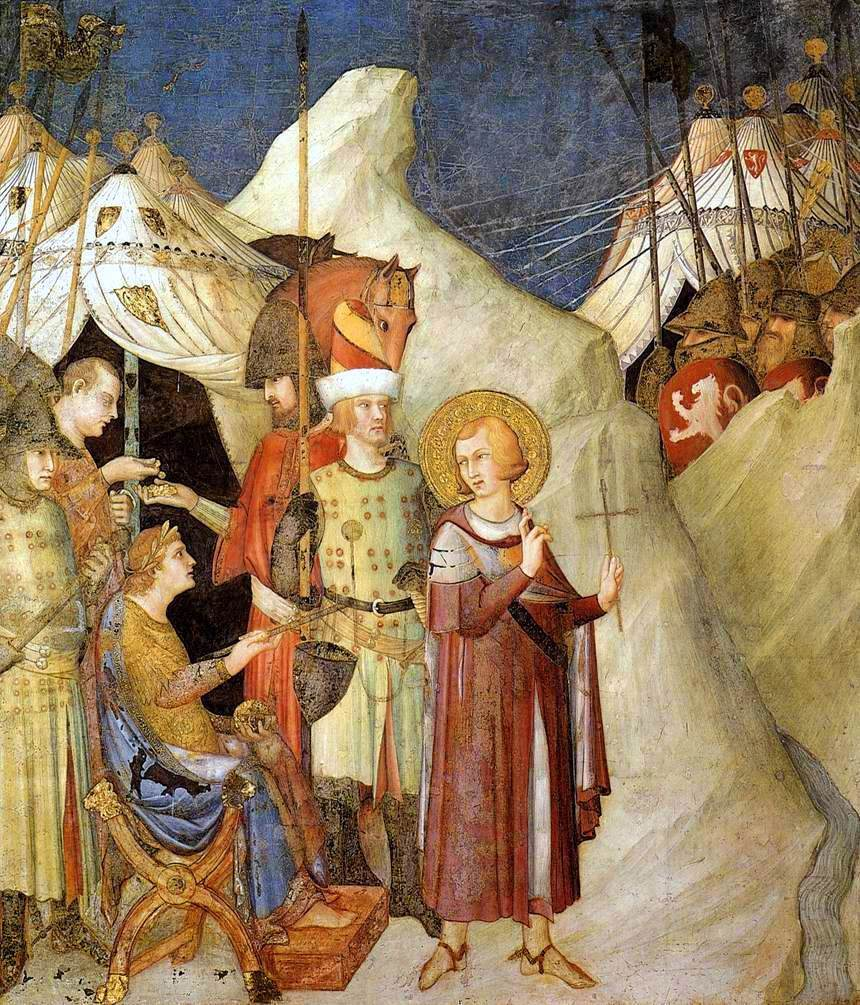
Renounce of St. Martin to the Weapons

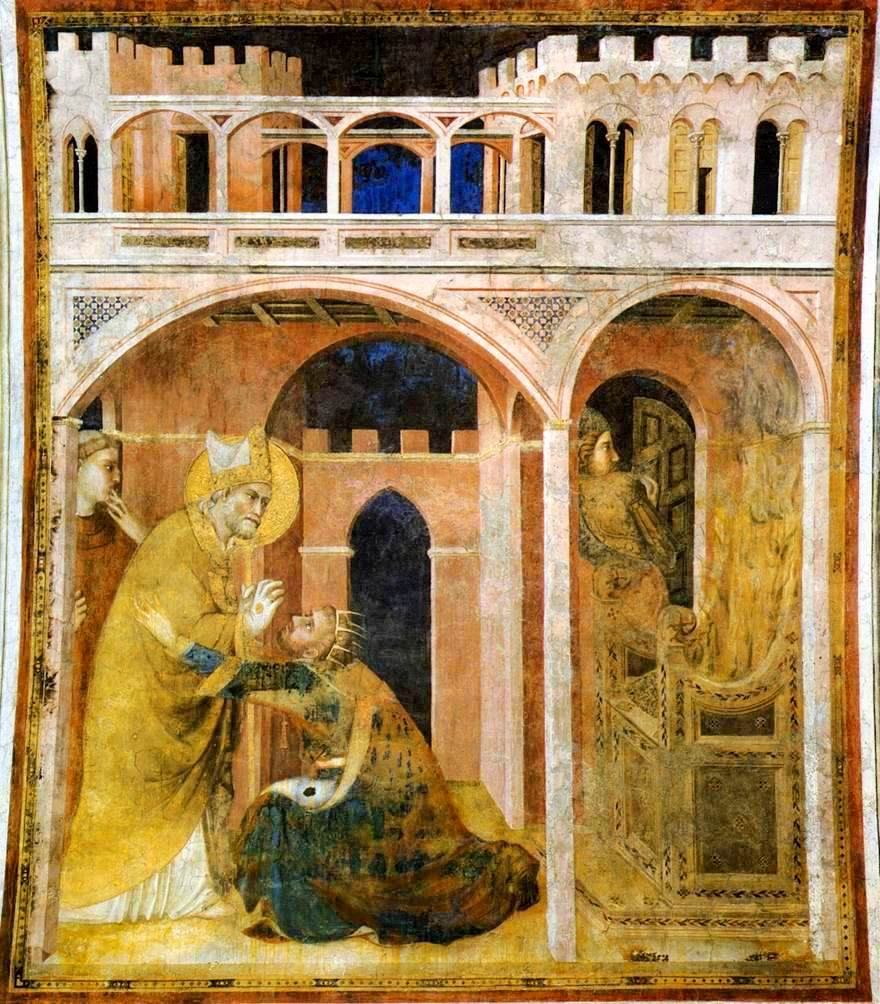
Visit to the Emperor with Burning Throne

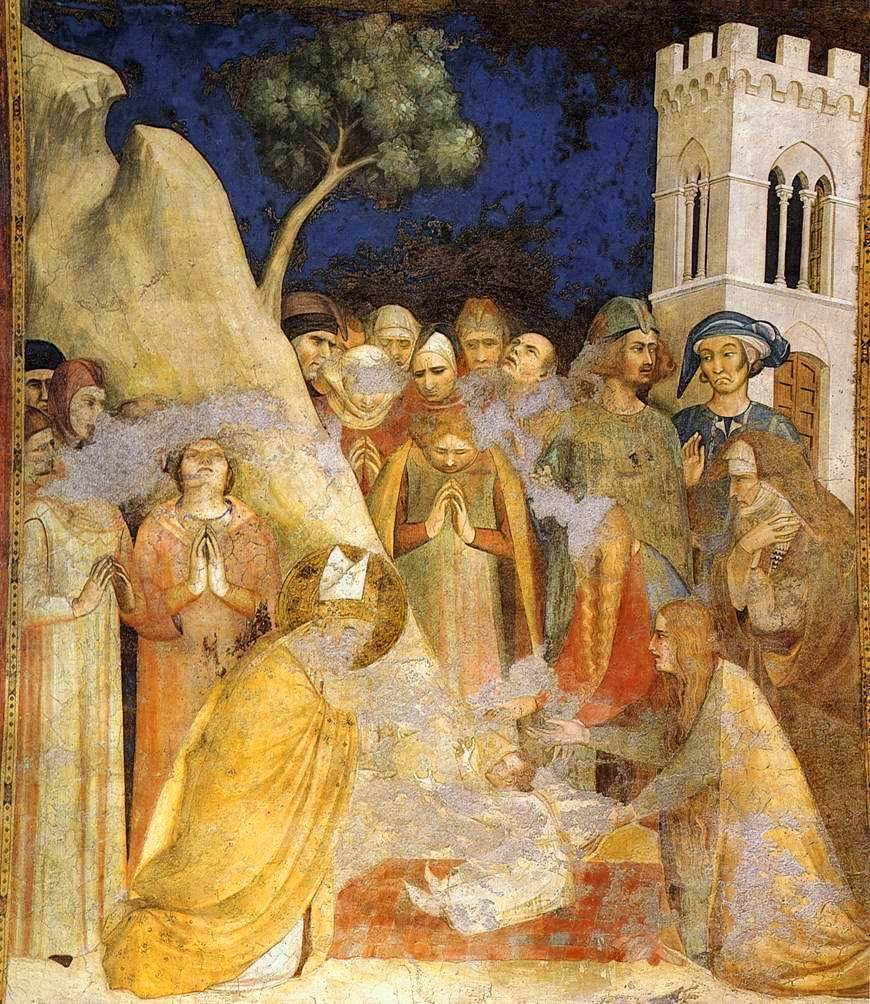
Resurrection of a Youth

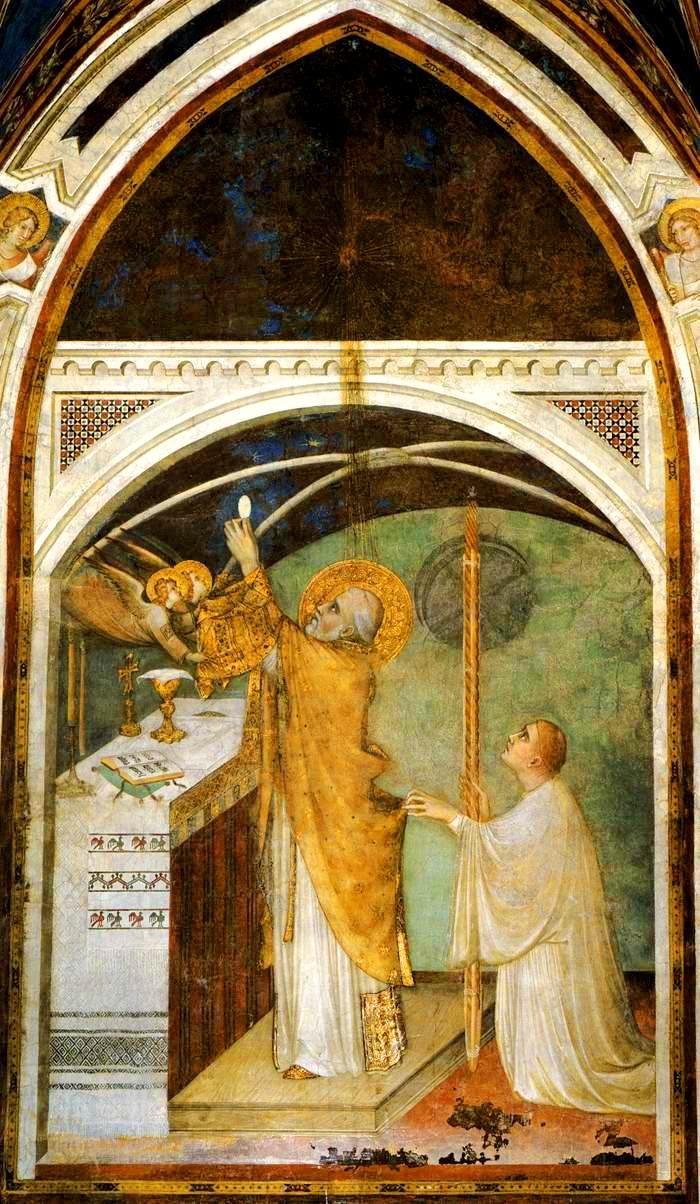
Miraculous Mass

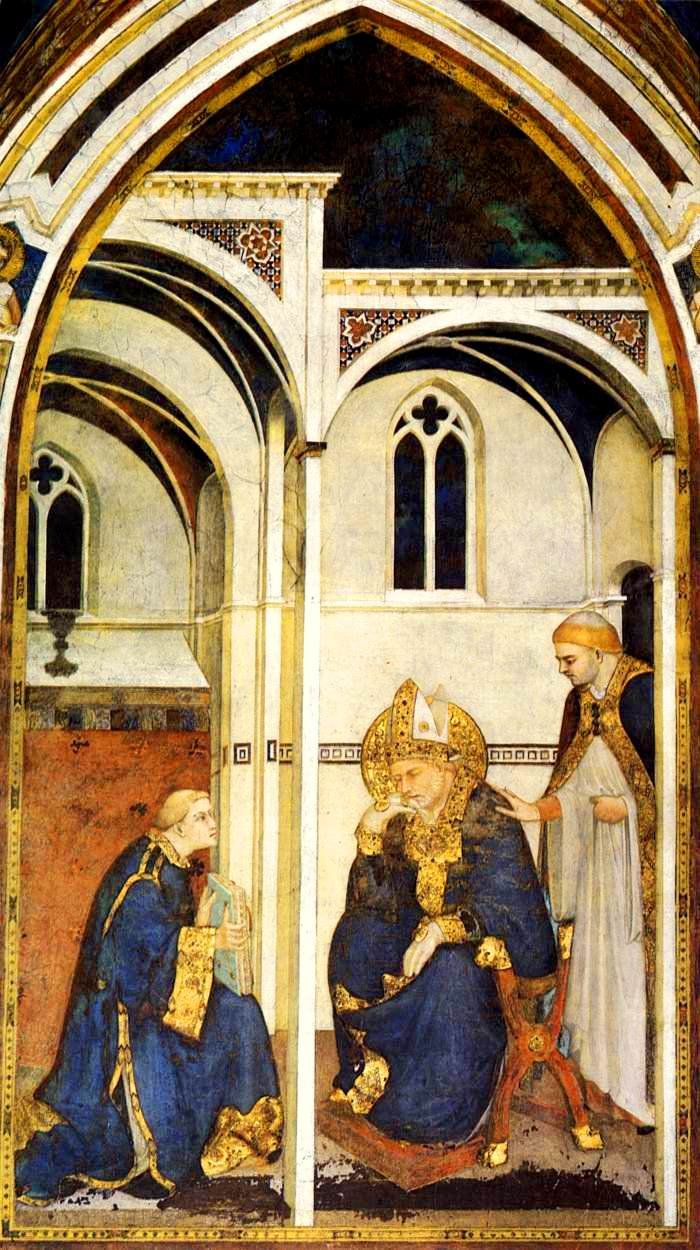
The Dream of St. Ambrose

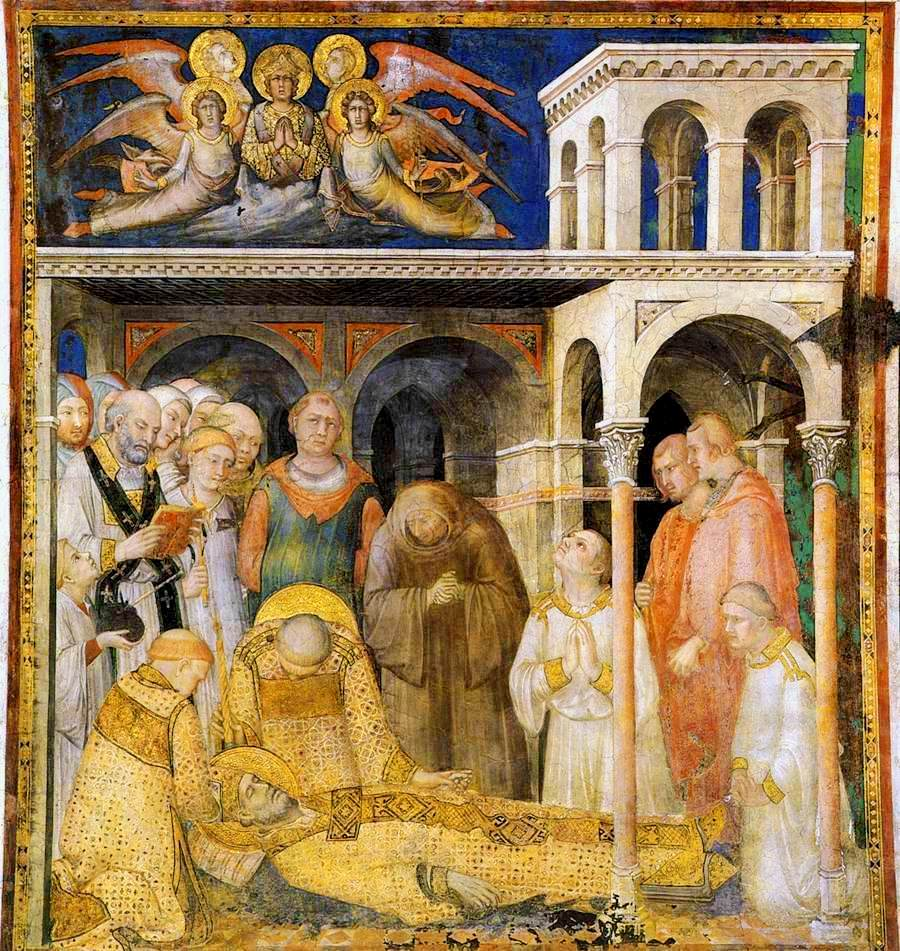
Death of St. Martin

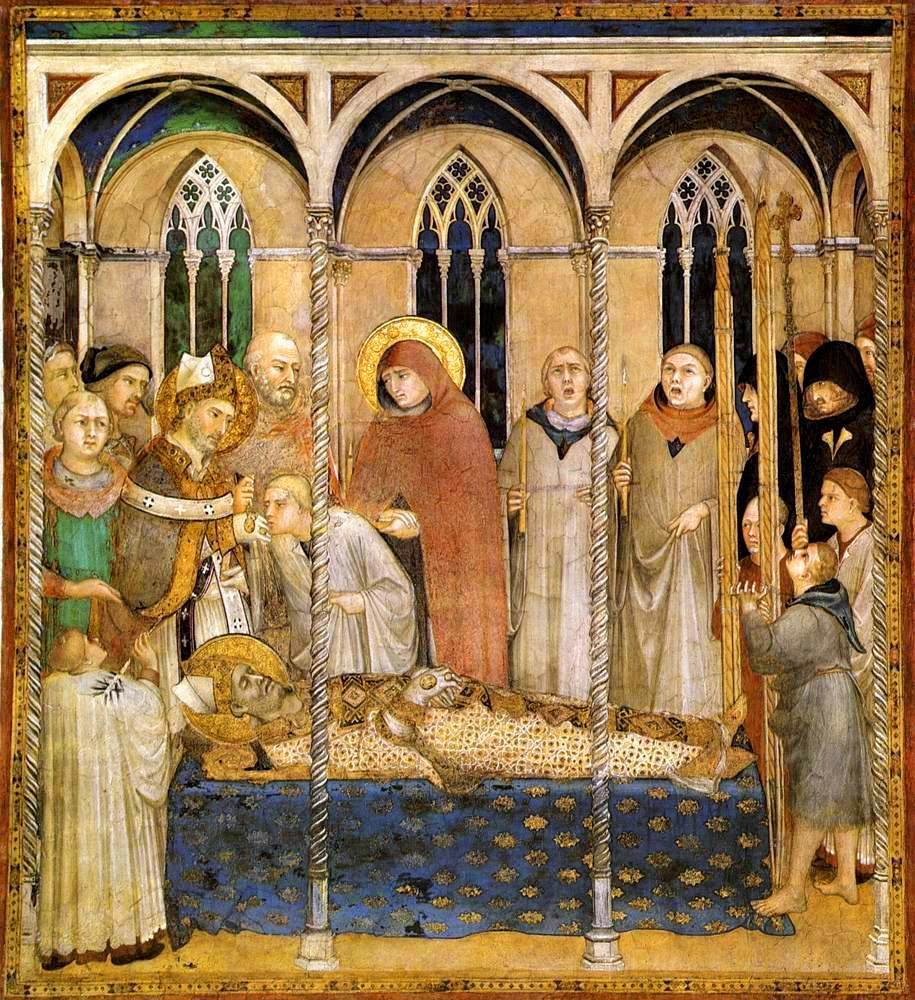
Funerals of St. Martin

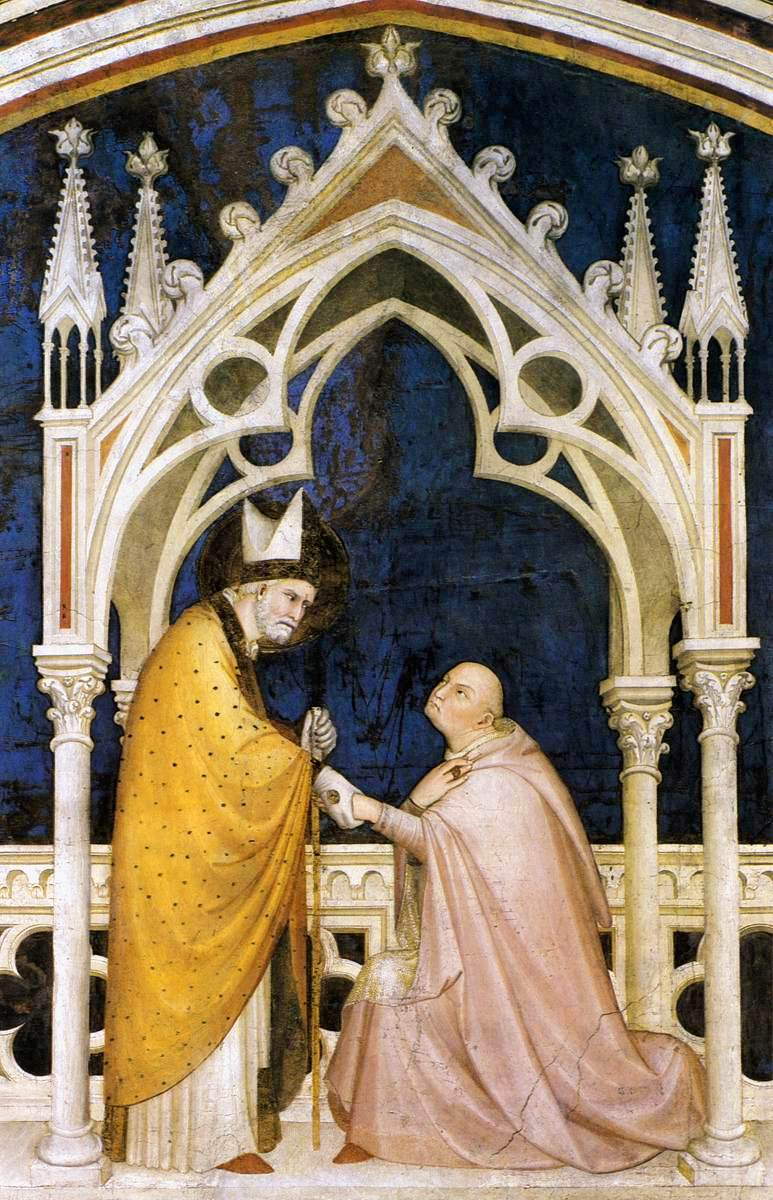
Dedication by Cardinal Gentile Portino da Montefiore

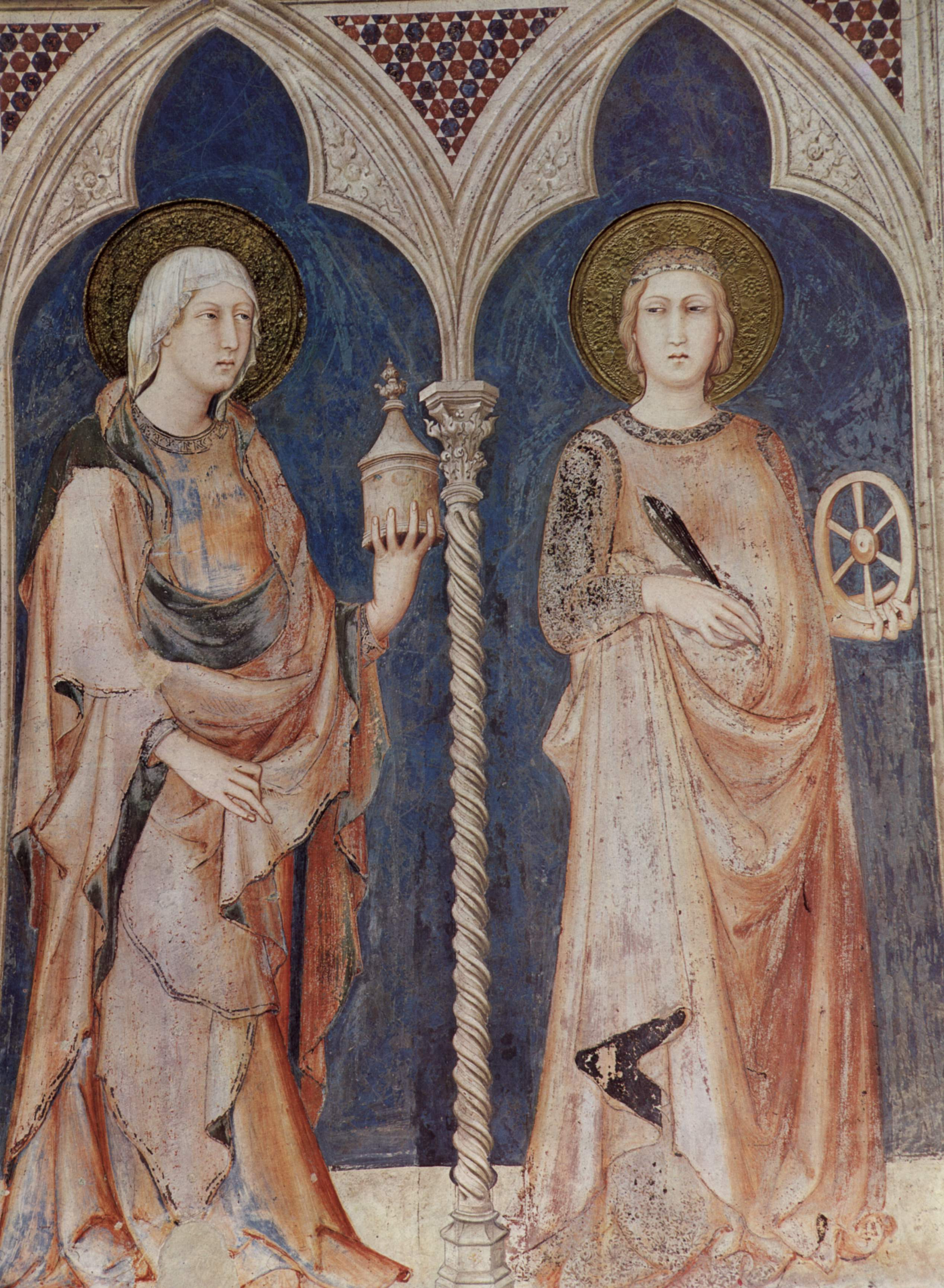
St. Mary Magdalene and St. Catherine of Alexandria

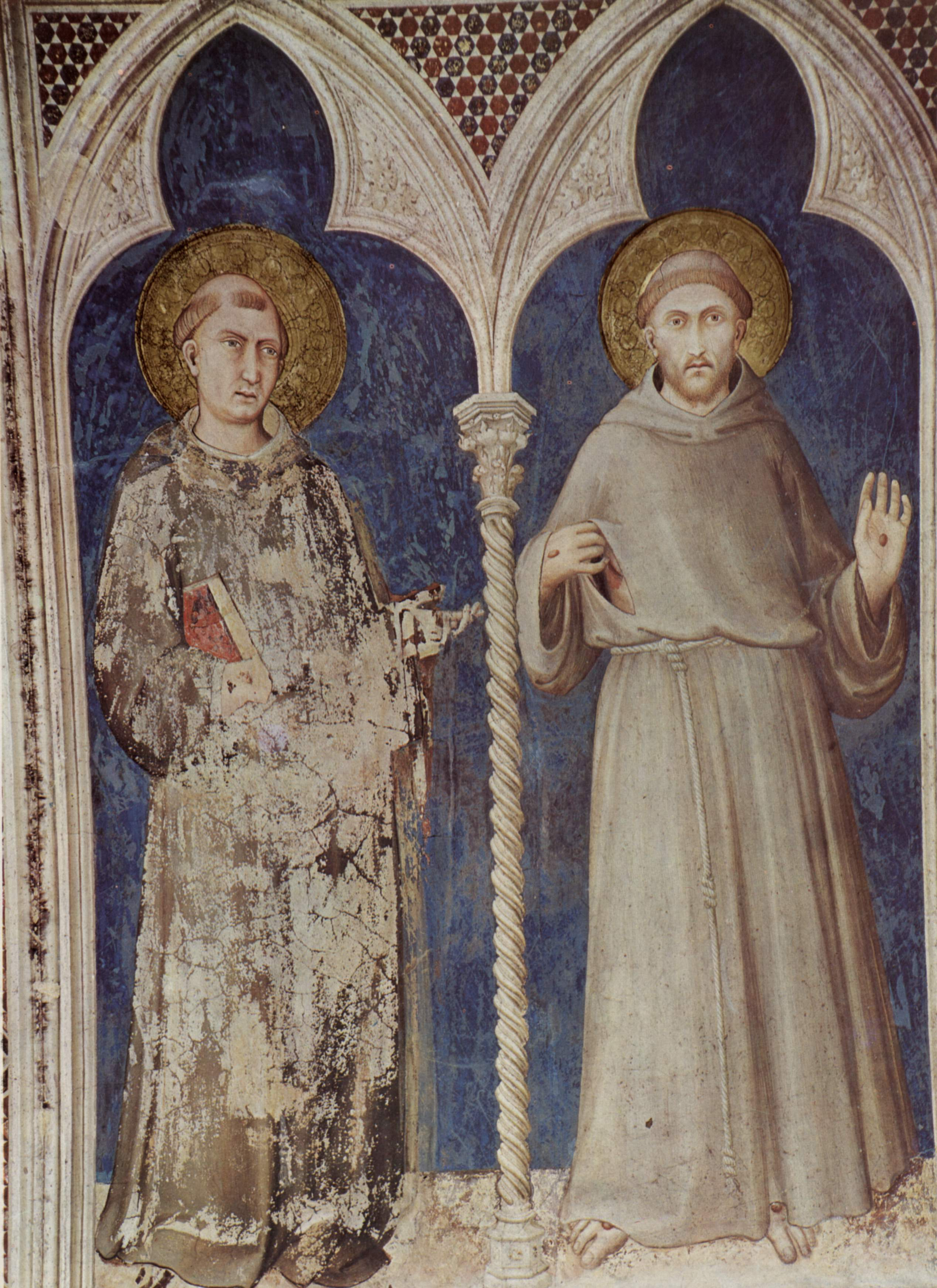
St. Anthony of Padua and St. Francis

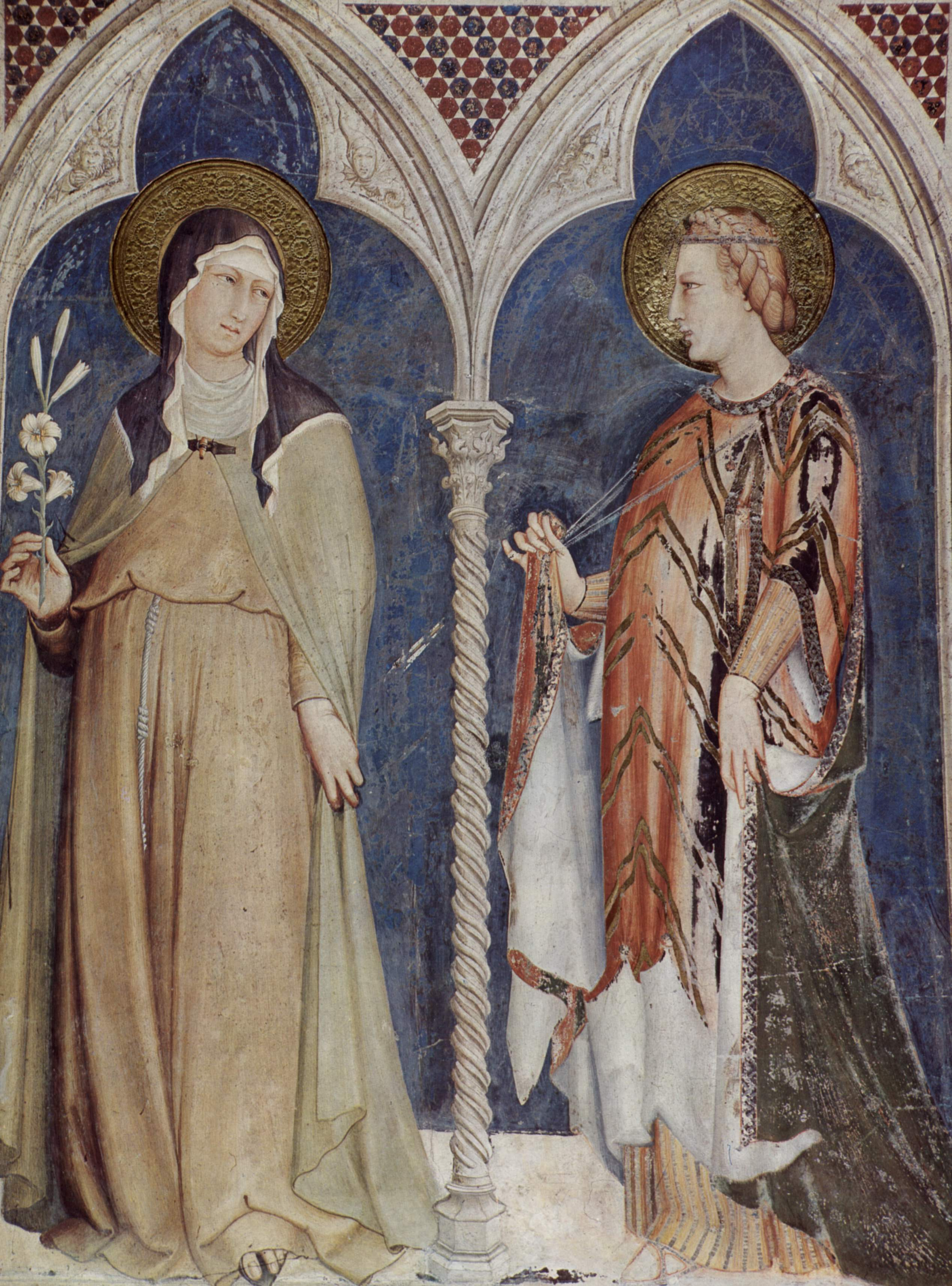
St. Clare and St. Elizabeth of Hungary

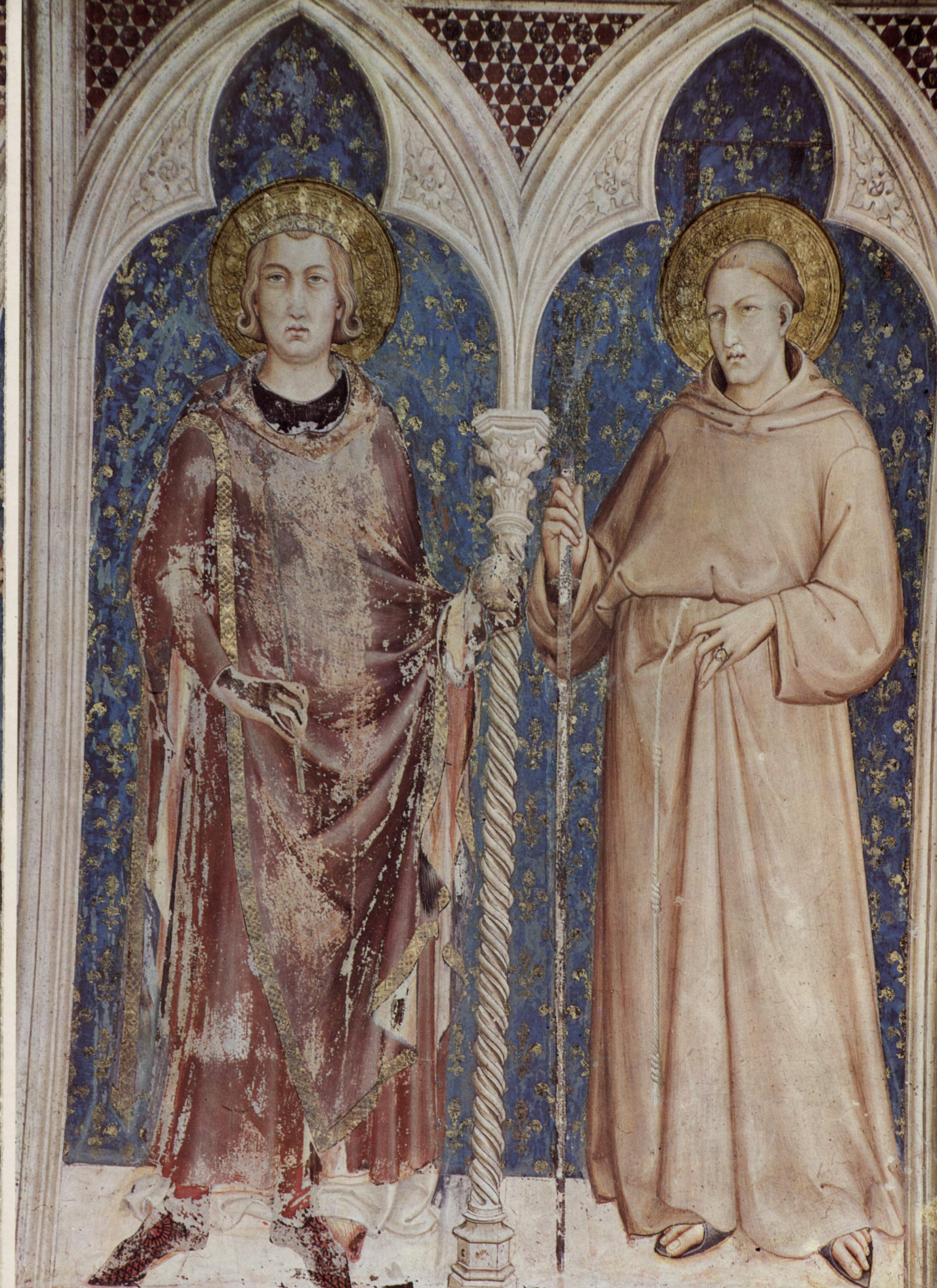
St. Louis of France and St. Louis of Toulouse

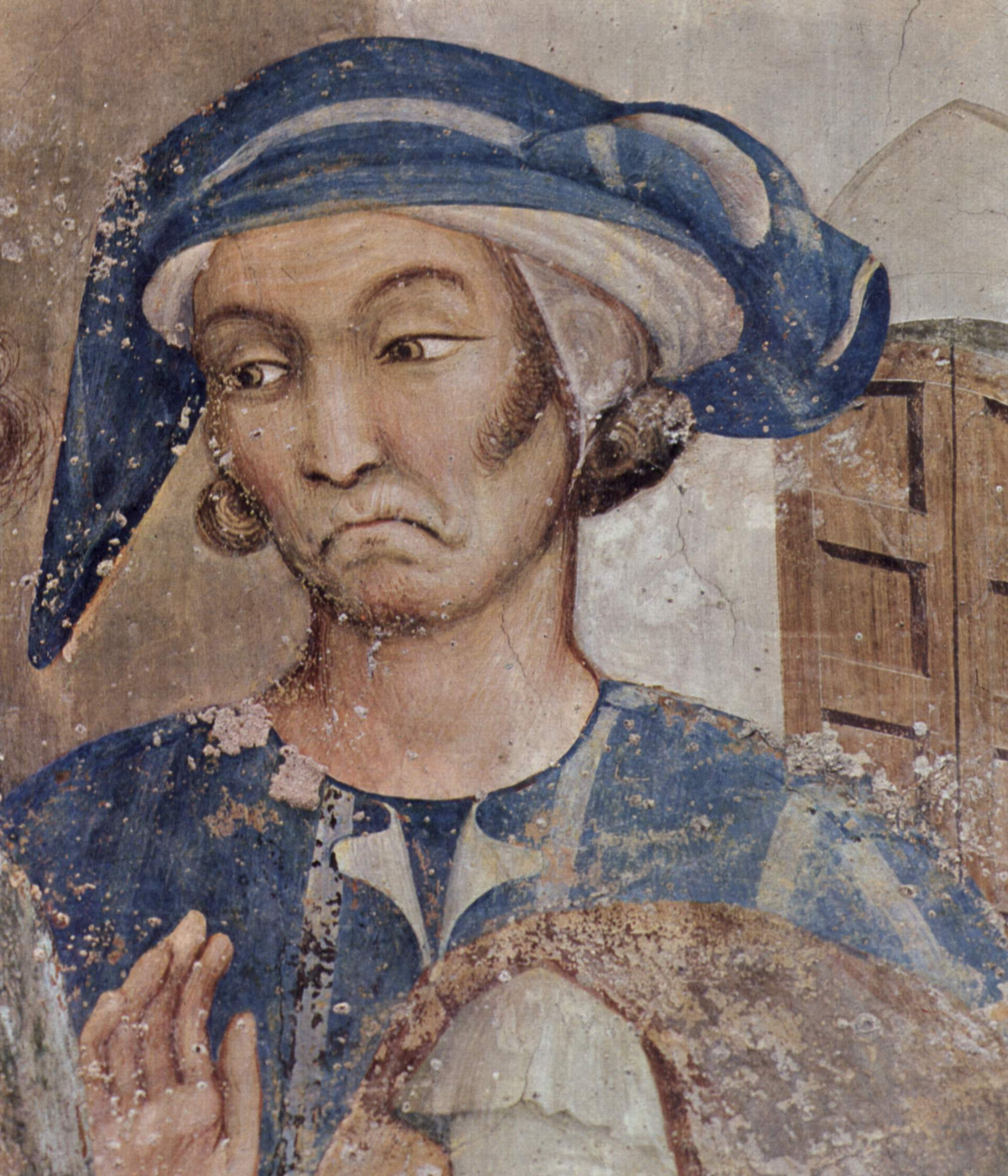
Detail of the Resurrection

The emperor who looks sharply at St. Martin in the Renounce, accusing him of cowardice, is likely identifiable with Frederick II, due to the black eagle in his camp. As a reply to the accusation, St. Martin is portrayed marching towards the enemy (symbolized by insignia with lions on red background) with a simple cross in his hands.

== Sources ==
- Pierini, Marco (2002). Simone Martini. Milan: Silvana Editore.
- de Castris, Pierluigi Leone (2003). Simone Martini. Milan: Federico Motta Editore.
