= Elena Ghiba Birta =

Protector of Romanian education (1801–1864)

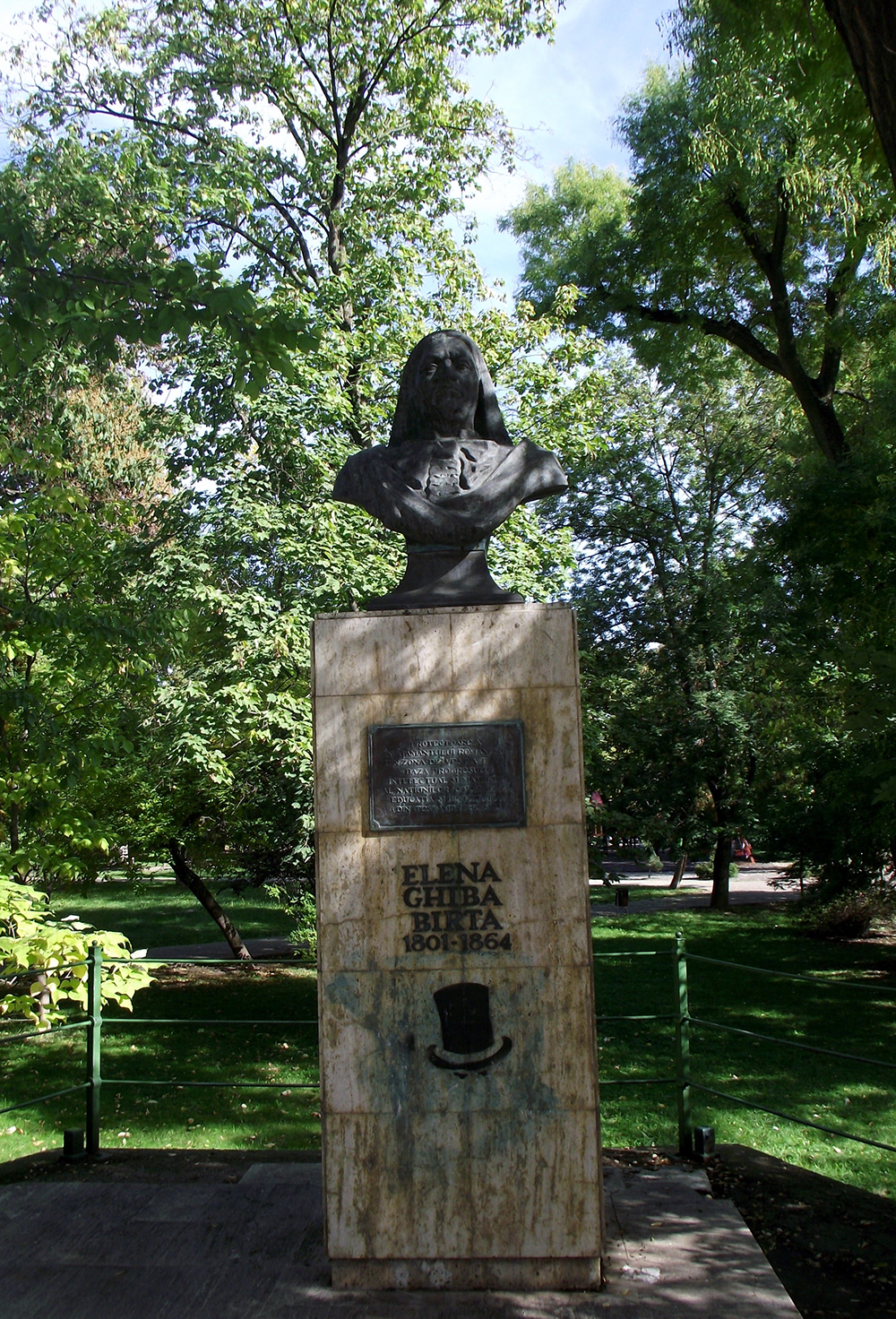
Bust of Elena Ghiba Birta in Arad

Elena Ghiba Birta (1801–1864) was a promoter of Romanian-language education in the Austrian Empire.

== Background ==
Elena Ghiba-Birta was born in Bichiș (Bekes), her mother being born in Ineu. At just 10 years old she became an orphan, going to live with her relatives in Pâncota. When she got married, she moved to Arad. After only a few years she became a widow, but she kept the name Birta, from her marriage.

In 1830, she started working for Emanoil Gogher, a job she kept for 33 years later. At his death, she inherited his wealth.

== Death ==
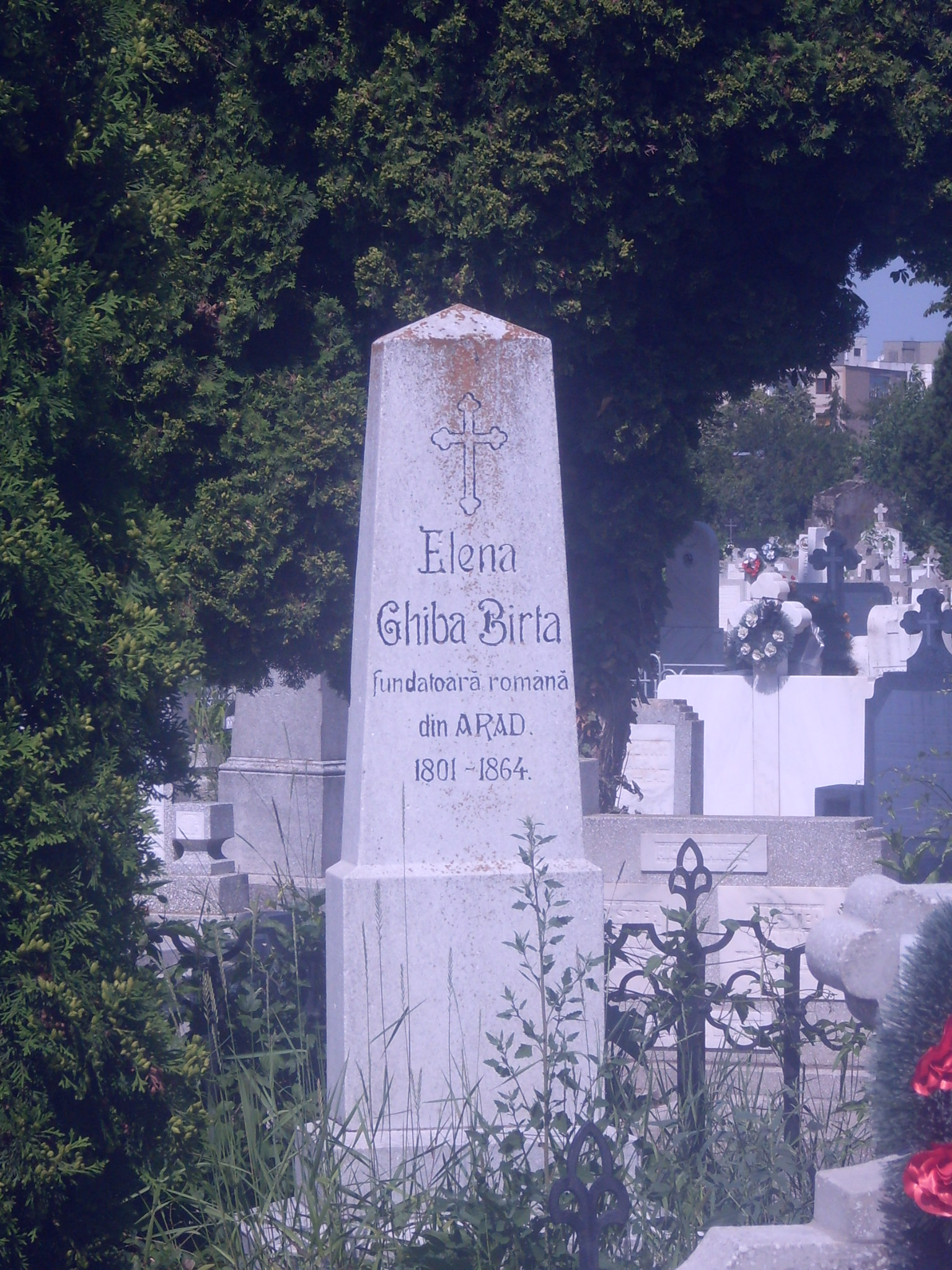
Grave of Elena Ghiba Birta at Eternitatea Cemetery, Arad

Elena Ghiba Birta died in January 1864, at Pest, where she was being treated for an illness. She was buried at the Eternitatea Cemetery in Arad.

== Legacy ==
Elena Ghiba Birta wrote her testament one year before her death, through which she made different donations. One of them was of 48,000 florins, for a foundation in her name. Out of that 12 scholarships were given annually, to students with less income, but deserving. Her name will always be remembered as a person whom helped students who were unable to pay for their studies.

The Elena Ghiba Birta National College in Arad, which bears her name, stands opposite her bust. A street in downtown Arad is also named after her.
