= Ațintiș (river) =

River in Romania

Ațintiș Ózd
- Location within Romania

Location
- Country: Romania
- Counties: Mureș County
- Villages: Bichiș, Ațintiș

Physical characteristics
- Mouth: Mureș
  - location: Ațintiș
  - coordinates: 46.433°N 24.111°E
- Length: 15 km (9.3 mi)
- Basin size: 64 km^{2} (25 sq mi)

Basin features
- Progression: Mureș→ Tisza→ Danube→ Black Sea

The Ațintiș (also: Ozd, Hungarian: Ózd-pataka) is a small river in the Gurghiu Mountains, Mureș County, northern Romania. It is a left tributary of the river Mureș. It flows through the municipality Bichiș, and joins the Mureș in the village Ațintiș. Its length is 15 km (9.3 mi) and its basin size is 64 km^{2} (25 sq mi).
