= Ațintiș =

Ațintiș Cintos
- Commune
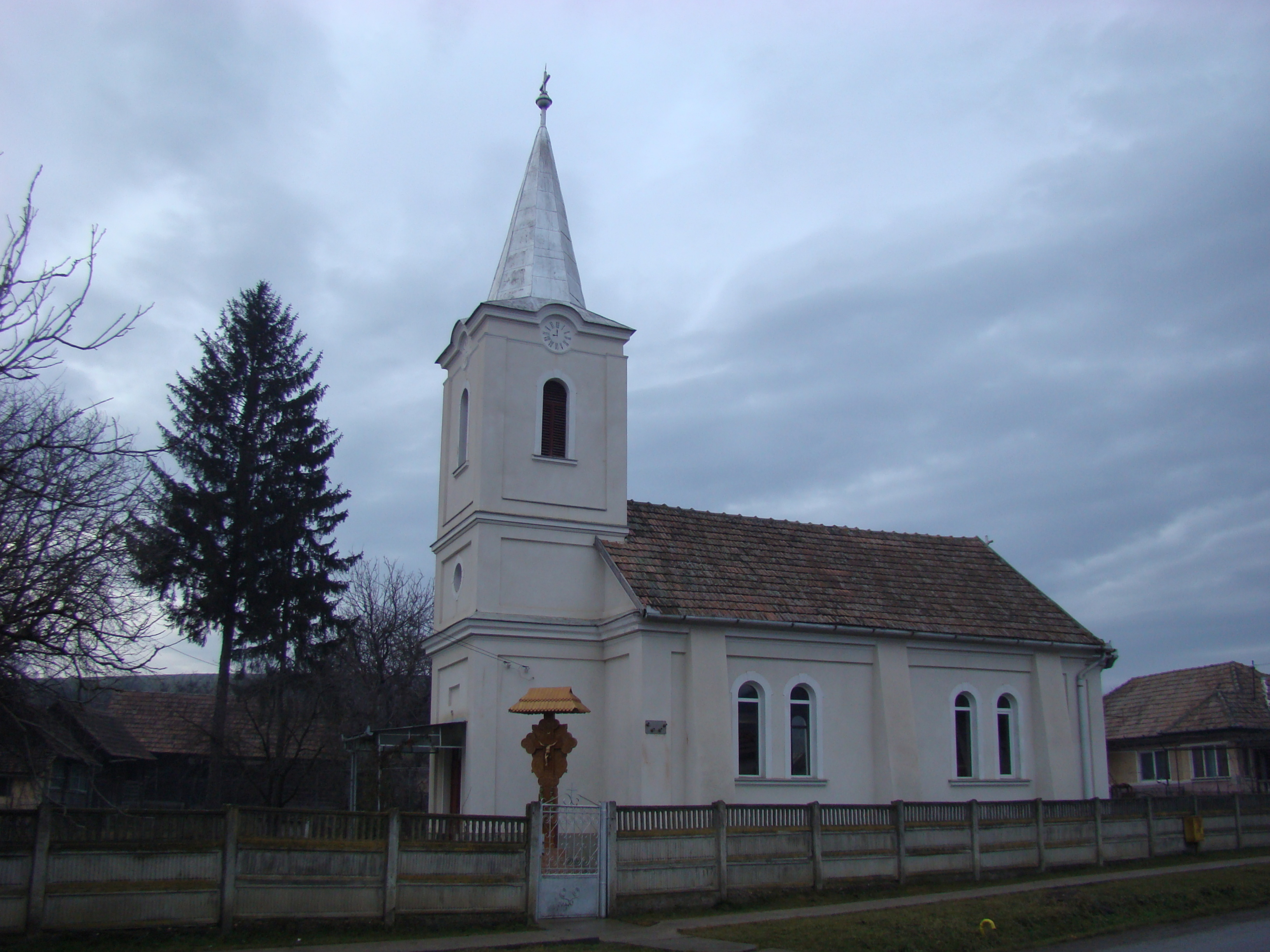
- Greek-Catholic church in Ațintiș

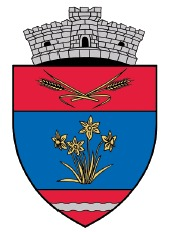
- Coat of arms

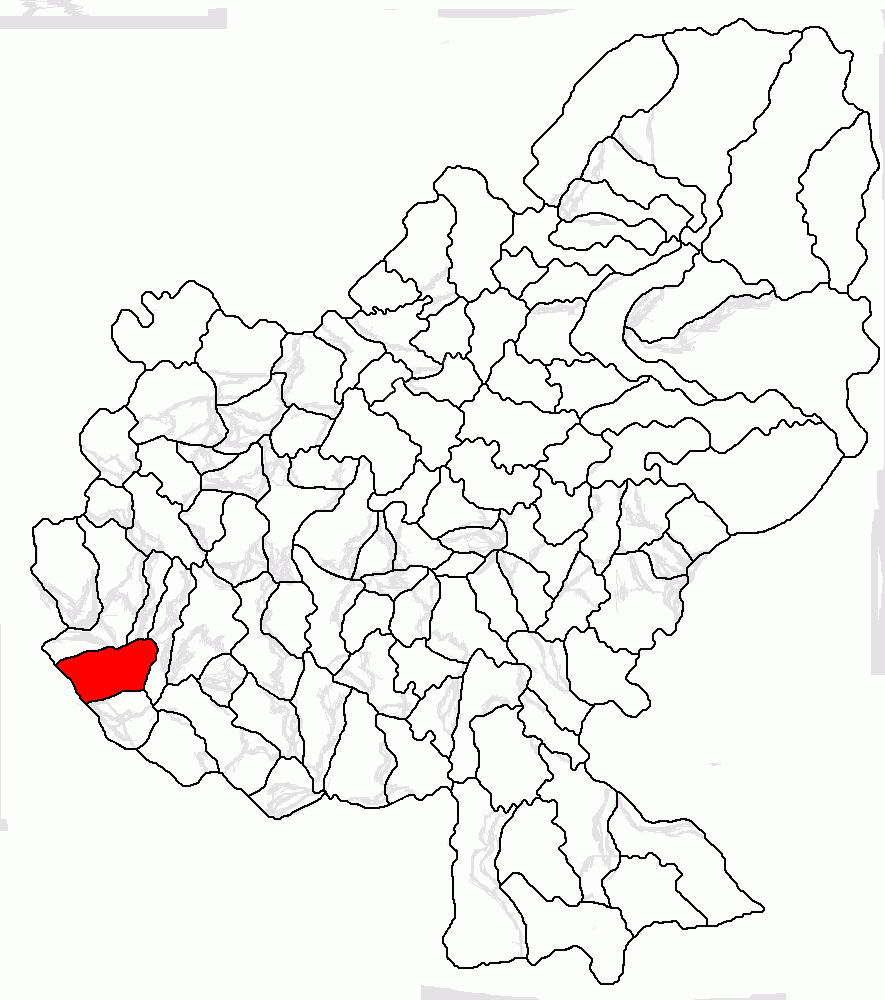
- Location in Mureș County

- Location in Romania
- Coordinates: 46°26′N 24°6′E
- Country: Romania
- County: Mureș

Government
  - Mayor (2024–2028): János-István Jakab (USR)
- Area: 49.08 km^{2} (18.95 sq mi)
- Elevation: 313 m (1,027 ft)
- Population (2021-12-01): 1,500
  - Density: 31/km^{2} (79/sq mi)
- Time zone: UTC+02:00 (EET)
  - Summer (DST): UTC+03:00 (EEST)
- Postal code: 547045
- Area code: (+40) 02 65
- Vehicle reg.: MS
- Website: atintis.ro

Ațintiș (Hungarian: Cintos, Hungarian pronunciation: [tsintoʃ]) is a commune in Mureș County, Transylvania, Romania. It is composed of six villages: Ațintiș, Botez (Batizháza), Cecălaca (Csekelaka), Iștihaza (Istvánháza), Maldaoci (Madavölgytanya), and Sâniacob (Marosszentjakab).

The commune lies on the Transylvanian Plateau, on the banks of the river Mureș and its left tributary, the river Ațintiș. It is located in the western part of the county, 55 km (34 mi) from the county seat, Târgu Mureș, on the border with Alba County.

As of the 2011 census, Ațintiș had a population of 1,575; of those, 59.2% were Romanians, 32% Hungarians, and 6.7% Roma. At the 2021 census, the commune had a population of 1,500; of those, 55.53% were Romanians, 32.67% Hungarians, and 5.73% Roma.

== See also ==
- List of Hungarian exonyms (Mureș County)
