= Bichiș =

Bichiș Magyarbükkös
- Commune
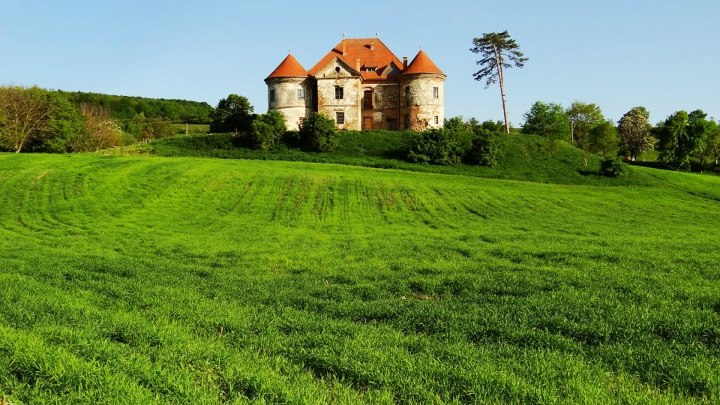
- Pekry–Radák mansion in Ozd

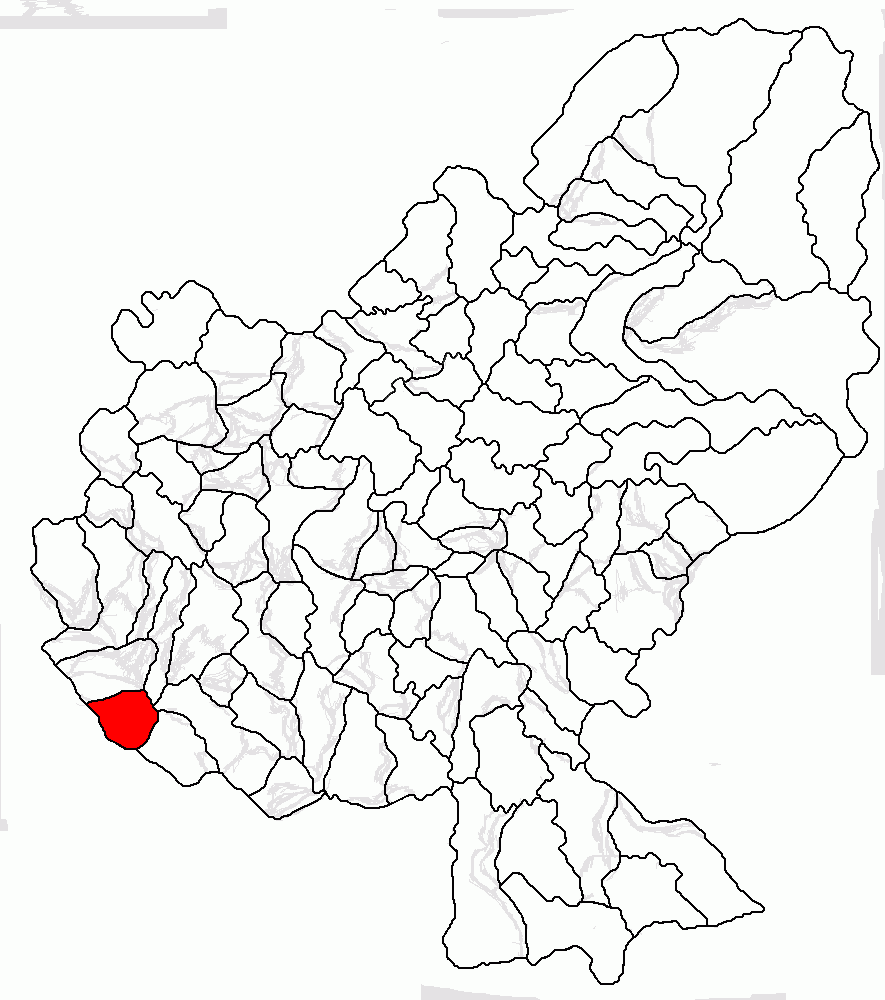
- Location in Mureș County

- Location in Romania
- Coordinates: 46°22′N 24°6′E
- Country: Romania
- County: Mureș

Government
  - Mayor (2020–2024): Ferencz-Attila Mihály (UDMR)
- Area: 46.55 km^{2} (17.97 sq mi)
- Elevation: 338 m (1,109 ft)
- Population (2021-12-01): 715
  - Density: 15.4/km^{2} (39.8/sq mi)
- Time zone: UTC+02:00 (EET)
  - Summer (DST): UTC+03:00 (EEST)
- Postal code: 547120
- Area code: (+40) 0265
- Vehicle reg.: MS
- Website: comuna-bichis.ro

Bichiș (Hungarian: Magyarbükkös, Hungarian pronunciation: [mɒɟɒrbykkøʃ]) is a commune in Mureș County, Transylvania, Romania. It is composed of four villages: Bichiș, Gâmbuț (Gombostelke), Nandra (Lándor), and Ozd (Magyarózd).

The commune is situated on the Transylvanian Plateau, at an altitude of 338 m (1,109 ft), on the banks of the river Ațintiș. It is located in the southwestern part of Mureș County, 16 km (10 mi) south of the town of Luduș and 53 km (33 mi) from the county seat, Târgu Mureș, on the border with Alba County.

Bichiș had a population of 1,039 at the 2002 census, and 805 at the 2011 census. At the 2021 census, there were 715 inhabitants, of which 52.17% were Hungarians, 31.89% Romanians, and 11.33% Roma.

== Natives ==
- Elena Ghiba Birta (1801–1864), promoter of Romanian-language education
- János Kemény (1607–1662), Prince of Transylvania from 1661 to 1662

== See also ==
- List of Hungarian exonyms (Mureș County)
