= Conservator (religion) =

A conservator (from Latin: conservator, lit. 'a keeper, preserver, defender'), (Note: The dictionary definition of conservator at Wiktionary) was a judge delegated by the pope to defend certain privileged classes of persons – as universities, Catholic religious orders, chapters, the poor – from manifest or notorious injury or violence, without recourse to a judicial process. Conservators were appointed as early as the 13th century; the title was given to officers appointed by the Synod of Würzburg in 1287 to protect the privileges of certain religious persons.

== History ==
The earliest recorded mention of conserators is in a decree by Pope Innocent IV, which presupposes their existence. (Note: Liber Septimus, VI 1.14.15 "De officio et potestate iudicis delegati", cited in Fanning (1908).) Owing to abuses and complaints the Council of Trent limited their jurisdiction, but new controversies, often recurring, caused popes Clement VIII, Gregory XV, and Innocent X to define their privileges more precisely.

Troubles continued to arise, especially concerning the conservators of religious orders. Pope Clement XIII decreed that in missionary countries such officials should no longer be chosen, but that all controversies should be referred to the Holy See. From that time forth conservators fell into practical desuetude.

According to law, these officials were to be chosen from among the prelates or dignitaries of cathedral and collegiate churches; later from the synodal judges. When a conservator had been chosen by regular clergy he could not be removed for five years without cause. He had no jurisdiction in cases that required juridical examination. While he took cognizance of all complaints against regular clergy, he had no authority to receive those of the regular clergy against others unless they were notorious. In the latter case the conservator decided the question summarily. He could punish with ecclesiastical penalties even high church dignitaries who interfered with his duties. His power was limited, however, to the one diocese in which be had been elected, nor could the same conservator have power in several dioceses.
