= Thomas Semsei =

Hungarian nobleman and soldier

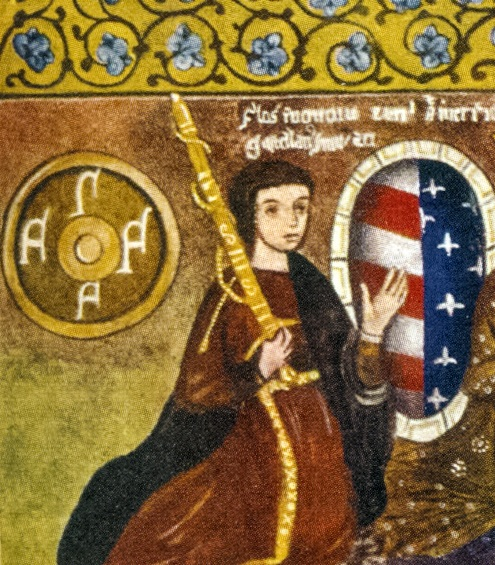
- Majority of scholars consider this figure in the fresco in Spišská Kapitula, present-day Slovakia, depicts Thomas Semsei

Vice-ispán of Szepes
- Reign: 1315–1327
- Predecessor: ?
- Successor: Peter of Siena
- Died: December 1334
- Noble family: House of Semsei
- Spouses: 1, Anne Tarkői; 2, Guze Hont-Pázmány
- Issue: (1) Catherine (2) Demetrius
- Father: Richter Frank von Meißen

Thomas Semsei (Hungarian: Semsei Tamás; died December 1334) was a Hungarian nobleman and soldier in the early 14th century. As a faithful confidant of Philip Drugeth, he served as vice-ispán of Szepes County and castellan of its namesake stronghold (present-day Spiš, Slovakia) from 1315 to 1327. The Semsei (later Semsey) family, which elevated to the rank of Count in 1907, descends from him.

== Ancestry and career ==
According to family traditions, the ancestor Richter Frank von Meißen originated from Meissen, Duchy of Saxony, who arrived to the Kingdom of Hungary during the reign of Béla IV and settled to Szepes County as one of the Zipser Germans. A contemporary charter places the year of his arrival at 1247. Thomas was born in the late 13th century. Contemporary documents refer to him as "Thomas filius Ferench" – "Thomas, son of Francis" (Hungarian: Ferenc).

As a young knight from the lower nobility, Thomas entered the service of Philip Drugeth, the most important confidant of King Charles I of Hungary. Whether Thomas participated in the monarch's struggles against his rival pretenders and, subsequently, the oligarchs, is unknown. When his lord, Philip Drugeth was appointed as ispán of Szepes County in 1315, Thomas became his deputy, the vice-ispán of the county and (vice)-castellan of Szepes Castle. He is first mentioned in this capacity in March 1316, when held both offices initially together with Nicholas Perényi. Thereafter, Thomas is mentioned as the sole office-holder, at first since March 1318. It is plausible that he held these offices until the death of Philip Drugeth in the summer of 1327 (in contemporary records he is last referred to as vice-ispán and castellan in September and November 1326, respectively). After William Drugeth took over the governance of the province in Northeast Hungary in 1327, Thomas left the allegiance of the Drugeth family.

== Acquisitions ==
Although his family originated from Szepes County and he held offices there, Thomas Semsei acquired a significant part of his wealth mainly in the neighboring Abaúj County. Thomas bought the western portion of Semse (present-day Šemša, Slovakia) from the Ruszkai family in December 1318. Thereafter, the village, which lays in the valley along the river Ida in the neighborhood of Pány (Paňovce), became the eponymous seat of Thomas' descendants. John Idai from the Aba clan mortgaged his own portion in Semse to Thomas for 25 marks in 1322. John Idai – otherwise, his relative – also donated the nearby Újfalu (Nováčany) to Thomas in 1323. Idai's portion (also called Egyházassemse) became the possession of Thomas in a hereditary right (iure perpetuo) by 1328. Meanwhile, Thomas bought the remaining portions of the Ruszkais in two installments, in 1324 and 1328. It was a break in prosperity when King Charles I confiscated the lands of the Verpeléti family from the Aba clan and donated those, along with Semse and Újfalu to Chenyk (Csenik), a Bohemian knight in 1331. Soon, Chenyk handed over the lands to the Fónyi family. Thomas reached an agreement with them in 1333: he relinquished ownership over Újfalu, but recovered Semse.

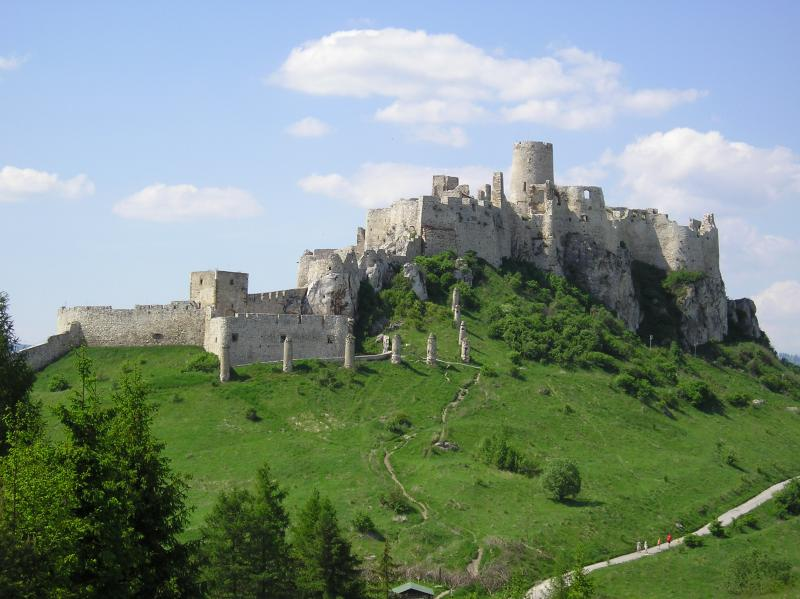
Spiš Castle (Szepes), where Thomas Semsei acted as castellan from 1315 to 1327

Thomas Semsei married Anne in 1321, the daughter of the late Henry Tarkői (died without male descendants in 1315). She was still minor in the previous year. She was involved in a lawsuit with her uncles over Henry's heritage. On 6 October 1321, the litigants reached an agreement in theory, according to a charter; Anne and Thomas were granted the estate Szalók (Slavkovce, Slovakia) in Sáros County, on the terms that if Anne died without heirs, Thomas would still have the right to dispose of it. However, Rikalf Tarkői complained on the same day before the Chapter of Szepes (Spišská Kapitula) that his family handed over the estate to Anne and her husband against their will, who also arbitrarily seized portions from the estate Tarca (Torysa) under the pretense of daughters' quarter. The Tarkőis protested against Thomas Semsei, who unlawfully seized Szalók. Despite that he successfully petitioned to the king, who confirmed Thomas and Anne as the new owners of the village in June 1322. Charles also granted the right to hold fairs on every Wednesdays. In November 1323, his dominus Philip Drugeth temporarily seized Szalók due to an undisclosed dispute with Semsei.

According to historian István Kádas, Thomas Semsei consciously chose the estates to be acquired: Semse laid along the highway between Kassa (Košice) and Szepes Castle, while Szalók was also close to the castle, where Semsei acted as castellan. He also intended to acquire lands in his place of origin, Szepes County. He was granted a royal forest along the river Kupferbah by Charles in 1325. Thereafter he was involved in a series of lawsuits with his neighbor Conrad Görgei. He also owned the nearby Kuncfalva (Helcmanovce), but these landholdings were later administratively attached to the towns Gölnicbánya (Gelnica) and Szomolnokbánya (Smolník). All of the above-mentioned estates – Semse, Szalók and Kuncfalva – were relatively sparsely populated. Therefore, Semsei hired soltész officials in order to organize the settlement of German-speaking colonists. Beside that, Thomas Semsei also owned some vineyards in Buda in Heves County.

== Personal life ==
The marriage of Thomas Semsei and Anne Tarkői produced a daughter Catherine. Sometime after 1321, Anne Tarkői died. Thomas Semsei married for the second time to Guze, the daughter of Lampert Hont-Pázmány from the clan's Bény branch. They had a son Demetrius, who may have been born no more than a few years before Thomas' death, as he was a minor even in 1346. The ailing Thomas Semsei compiled his last will and testament on 22 December 1334, days before his death. In accordance with the document, Thomas bequeathed Szalók to his daughter Catherine, while the infant Demetrius inherited Semse and the vineyards in Buda. Guze Hont-Pázmány and her kinship – primarily courtly knight Pancras Pányi, the guardian of Demetrius, and his brother Demetrius Pányi – took over the management of the Semsei estates for the upcoming years.

Majority of scholars and art historians consider the fresco of in St Martin's Cathedral in the Chapter of Szepes, which depicts the 1310 coronation of Charles, also represents Thomas Semsei with a sword, kneeling behind the monarch under the inscription "flos iuventutis camerarius, castellanus Fran…de…", along with the king, Archbishop Thomas of Esztergom and Henry, Provost of Szepes. According to Arnold Ipolyi, Thomas may have played an important role at the coronation, where he could hold the royal sword as a juvenile member of the royal court. However, according to Attila Zsoldos, based on the social status of Thomas Semsei, it is highly questionable whether he would have played such an important role. Serbian historian Đura Hardi argues the kneeling figure actually depicts Thomas' dominus, Philip Drugeth. The four F letters on his stylized shield could relate to his Latinized name (Filippus). The palaeographic results of the 2005 restoration of the fresco revealed the inscriptions are historicizing modern ones, which were falsified in neo-Gothic style in the second half of the 19th century. Hardi argues Philip Drugeth would not have allow himself to leave such an important place in the fresco to one of his familiares.

His descendants, the Semseys were granted the title of Count by King Francis Joseph I on 27 August 1907. They adopted a new coat-of-arms thereafter, which also depicts their ancestor, Thomas Semsei as the shield holder figure on the right side.

== Sources ==
- Bartha, Annamária (2012). "Hatalmaskodás és nők 1301–1323 közötti okleveles források tükrében [Acts of Might and Women in the Charters between 1301–1323]". In Kiss P., Attila; Piti, Ferenc; Szabados, György (eds.). Középkortörténeti tanulmányok 7 (in Hungarian). University of Szeged. pp. 325–336. ISBN 978-963-306-160-2.
- Engel, Pál (1996). Magyarország világi archontológiája, 1301–1457, I. [Secular Archontology of Hungary, 1301–1457, Volume I] (in Hungarian). História, MTA Történettudományi Intézete. ISBN 963-8312-44-0.
- Hardi, Đura (2012). Drugeti. Povest o usponu i padu porodice pratilaca Anžujskih kraljeva [Drugeths. The History of the Rise and Decline of the Escorts of Angevin Kings] (in Serbo-Croatian (Latin script)). Faculty of Philosophy, University of Novi Sad. ISBN 978-86-6065-108-4.
- Kádas, István (2013). "Középkori család- és birtoktörténet: A Semseiek [Medieval Family and Estate History: The Semseis]". Fons (in Hungarian). 20 (4). Szentpétery Imre Történettudományi Alapítvány: 423–454. ISSN 1217-8020.
- Pozsonyi, József (2002). A semsei Semsey család története [The History of the Semsey Family of Semse] (in Hungarian). Hajdú-Bihar Megyei Múzeumok Igazgatósága. ISBN 963-7218-37-8.
- Zsoldos, Attila (2017). A Druget-tartomány története 1315–1342 [The History of the Druget Province 1315–1342] (in Hungarian). MTA Bölcsészettudományi Kutatóközpont Történettudományi Intézete. ISBN 978-963-4160-63-2.
