= Egidius Monoszló =

Hungarian baron

Egidius (II) Monoszló

Master of the treasury
- Reign: 1270–1272; 1274–1275
- Predecessor: Maurice Pok (1st term); Joachim Gutkeled (2nd term)
- Successor: Ernye Ákos (1st term); Joachim Gutkeled (2nd term)
- Born: c. 1240
- Died: March 1313; Nagyszombat (?), Hungary (today Trnava, Slovakia)
- Noble family: gens Monoszló
- Spouse: Catherine Kökényesradnót
- Issue: four daughters
- Father: Gregory II
- Mother: N Bő

Egidius (II) from the kindred Monoszló (Hungarian: Monoszló nembeli (II.) Egyed; c. 1240 – March 1313) was a Hungarian powerful baron, who served as Master of the treasury from 1270 to 1272 and from 1274 to 1275. He was a loyal supporter of Stephen V of Hungary from his ducal years.

== Family background ==
Egidius II was born into the gens Monoszló around 1240 as the son of Gregory II, who functioned as ispán of Krassó County in 1255. His mother was an unidentified noblewoman from the gens Bő, possibly the daughter of Ders. His grandfather was Thomas I, the Ban of Slavonia between 1228 and 1229. Egidius had two brothers, Gregory III, who served as Judge of the Cumans and was Egidius' strong ally, and Peter, who functioned as Bishop of Transylvania from 1270 to 1307. The three brothers supported each other in national politics and gradually distinguished themselves from the other branches of the Monoszló kindred. This intention also appeared in contemporary documents and charters, when their names were referred with the suffixes "de genere Thome bani" ("from Ban Thomas' kindred"), and later "de Filek", when Egidius was granted Fülek Castle (today Fiľakovo, Slovakia) from his lord, Duke Stephen.

He married Catherine from the gens Kökényesradnót, daughter of Emeric and niece of Mikod, who served as Ban of Severin from 1275 to 1276. They had four unidentified daughters, and Egidius became a relative of the Nyék branch of the Aba kindred, the Borsa kindred, the Amadé branch of the Gutkeled kindred and the subsequently influential Kórógyi family through their marriages. Egidius had no legitimate sons, only a doubtful authentic charter from 1327 mentions a certain Nicholas in this respect, but since if he was an existing person at all, he had to die before Egidius' death in 1313.

== In Stephen's court ==
Egidius and his kindred, in addition to the Csák clan, were one of the most loyal supporters of Duke Stephen, who forced his father, King Béla IV of Hungary to cede all the lands of the Kingdom of Hungary to the east of the Danube to him and adopted the title of junior king in 1262. Egidius belonged to Stephen's court and participated in the Duke's civil war against the monarch in the 1260s. According to a charter, Egidius' familiaris, Andrew de Menej fought in the Siege of Feketehalom under Monoszló banner which also confirms Egidius' presence in the skirmish. In 1265, Egidius was mentioned as Master of the stewards in Stephen's court, possibly replacing Stephen Csák in that capacity. He interceded at his lord in the same year to grant nobility for the members of the Dobra kindred, his faithful castle warriors in Bács County for their bravery and merits in the civil war.

When Stephen's vassal, Despot Jacob Svetoslav submitted himself to Tsar Constantine Tikh of Bulgaria, taking advantage of the civil war in Hungary, they crossed the Danube in 1265 and raided the Hungarian fortresses north of the river which belonged to Stephen's realm. In response, after Béla and Stephen signed the peace treaty on the Rabbits' Island, the Junior King, with the limited support of Béla's royal army, invaded Bulgaria in the summer of 1266. Egidius participated in the campaign and led Stephen's army to successfully besiege and capture Tirnovo (in one of the five major battles), also plundering the surrounding areas. Meanwhile the main army seized Vidin, Pleven and other forts, while another army commanded by Gregory Péc routed the Bulgarians in Vrchov. After the victory, Egidius was made Master of the treasury in Stephen's court in 1266 and served in that capacity until Stephen's ascension to the Hungarian throne following the death of Béla IV in May 1270. Egidius also served as ispán of Csanád and Ung Counties in 1266, which administrative units then belonged to Stephen's realm.

Egidius continued his political role as Master of the treasury, when Stephen V succeeded his father without difficulties and was crowned on or after 17 May 1270. Among the eight office-holders of high dignities, he was one of those four lords – alongside the influential brothers, Peter I and Matthew II Csák, and Egidius' distant relative Nicholas Monoszló – who entered government service after years of anti-King position and participation in the war against Béla. In addition, Egidius also became ispán of Pozsony County, one of the most prominent of them all. His brothers also have reached significant positions, thus the Monoszlós rose among the most prominent kindreds during Stephen's short reign. Egidius was a member of that delegation which was sent to Marchegg following the Bohemian–Hungarian war in 1271 in order to conclude a peace. Thereafter, he was among the Hungarian lords who signed the Peace of Pressburg on 2 July 1271 with the envoys of Ottokar II of Bohemia to put an end to the war between the two realms.

== Role in the feudal anarchy ==
When the Ban of Slavonia, Joachim Gutkeled, turned against Stephen V and kidnapped his ten-year old son and heir, Ladislaus in the summer of 1272, a new era had begun in Medieval Hungary. Stephen besieged Joachim's fortress in Koprivnica, but could not free his son. The king soon fell ill and died on 6 August 1272, thus the Monoszló brothers lost their patron. Joachim Gutkeled departed for Székesfehérvár as soon as he was informed of Stephen V's death, because he wanted to arrange Ladislaus' coronation. Stephen's widow, Elizabeth the Cuman joined him, infuriating Stephen V's partisans who accused her of having conspired against her husband. Egidius Monoszló immediately laid siege in late August to the Dowager Queen's palace in Székesfehérvár to "rescue" Ladislaus from the rival baronial group's influence. Another foreign chronicles – including the Continuatio Vindobonensis – claimed the Monoszlós wanted to assert Duke Béla of Macsó's claim to the Hungarian throne, but historian Attila Zsoldos rejects this option.

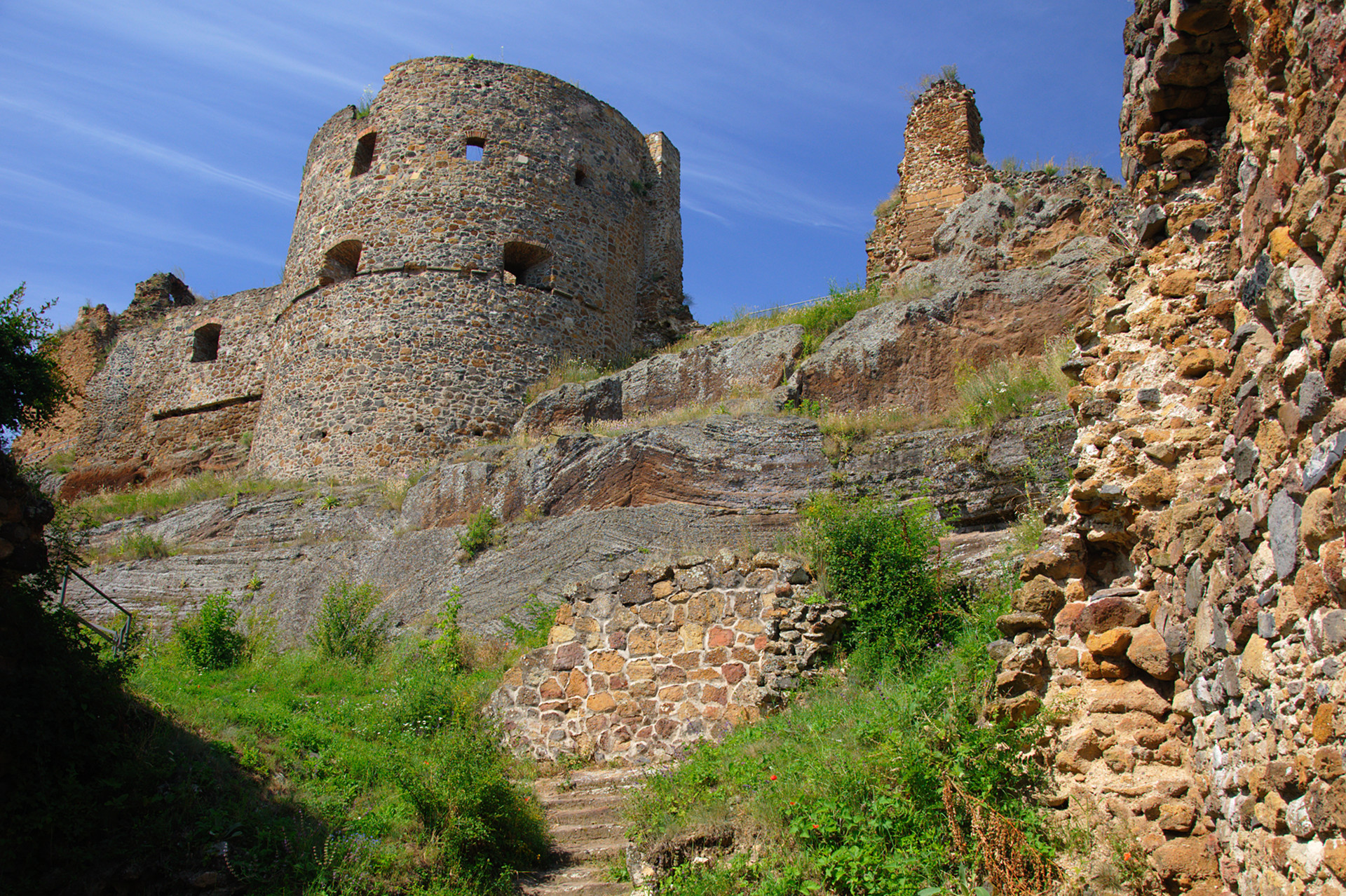
Fiľakovo (Fülek) Castle, present-day in Slovakia

However Egidius' military action ended in failure as the Gutkeled troops routed his army after some clashes and bloodshed. As an Austrian chronicler wrote, Egidius, "fear of the Queen's revenge", fled to Pressburg (today Bratislava, Slovakia), alongside his brother, Gregory. They captured the castle and its surrounding areas and handed over to Ottokar II who provided shelter to them. Their Hungarian lands were confiscated following that by Queen Elizabeth in the name of his son. The Monoszló brothers were granted the Austrian castles of Laa, Stockerau, Korneuburg and Kreuzenstein, in addition to annual appanage of 2,000 marks by Ottokar, who also commissioned them to administrate Pressburg and the adjacent forts. This favorable treatment infuriated Henry Kőszegi, who, as a former ally of the late Béla IV, had spent the last two years in exile at Ottokar's court in Prague. According to the narratives, Henry Kőszegi hated Egidius wholeheartedly, who, furthermore, received Laa during his arrival, Henry's grant two years earlier. As a result he decided to return Hungary and joined Elizabeth and Joachim's baronial group, despite the former ancient hostilities.

Taking advantage of the internal political crisis, Ottokar's Austrian and Moravian troops invaded the borderlands of Hungary in April 1273, using the Pressburg region as a march route. The attack temporarily united the rivaling baronial groups against the external enemy. Ottokar's step made Egidius as uncertain and furious, as a result he left Prague and returned to Hungary in early May, along with Gregory. The Bohemian sources described Egidius as "confused and infelicitous" during this act. Egidius swore loyalty to Ladislaus IV, thus received forgiveness from Elizabeth and the Monoszlós' confiscated lands were regained. In the short-lived "unity government", Egidius simultaneously served as Ban of Macsó and Bosnia, both territories split from Béla of Macsó's ducal domains, who was brutally assassinated in November 1272 by Henry Kőszegi. The cooperation lasted only a few months. In a second wave, Ottokar's army captured Győr and Szombathely, plundering the western counties, and seized many fortresses, including Sopron in the autumn. Alongside Denis Péc and Joachim Gutkeled, Egidius defeated a Moravian army at the walls of Detrekő Castle (today ruins near Plavecké Podhradie, Slovakia) in October, which fort was unsuccessfully besieged by Ottokar's troops. Egidius was also involved in that campaign which attempted to recapture Nagyszombat (today Trnava, Slovakia). Around October 1273, the Kőszegi–Gutkeled–Geregye baronial group took control over the country, ousting the Csák kindred. Egidius, who and his clan were the Csáks' strongest ally, also lost his dignity of Ban of Macsó and Bosnia.

In the first five regnal years of the minor Ladislaus IV, twelve "changes of government" took place between the two baronial groups. The Csáks and their allies successfully removed Joachim Gutkeled and Henry Kőszegi from power by the summer of 1274. After that the two disgraced lords decided to capture and imprison Ladislaus and Elizabeth in June 1274. Although Peter Csák liberated them, Gutkeled and Kőszegi captured Ladislaus's younger brother, Andrew, and took him to Slavonia. Egidius again elevated to the position of Master of the treasury around September 1274, in those days when Peter Csák, defeated the united Kőszegi–Gutkeled forces near Polgárdi, where the most notorious pre-oligarch Henry Kőszegi was killed in the battle. By mid-1275, the royal court expressed confidence towards the Kőszegi family despite the earlier abductions. This meant the Csák group's anew fall from grace, and Egidius lost his office of Master of the treasury in early June 1275, replacing by Joachim Gutkeled himself.

== Later life ==
Both Egidius and Gregory lost all political influence for uncertain reasons after 1275, as they had never hold any dignities after that, despite the fact that the Csák group was able to return to govern the realm even at the end of the year. Historian Bálint Hóman claimed their violent nature made them incapable of compromise, but it is plausible they became political victims of the feudal anarchy's turbulent machinations of power. As historian Jenő Szűcs noted the Monoszló brothers ought to have ensured the Csák group's territorial base beyond the Drava river, as their castles – e.g. Atyina and Monoszló (today Voćin and Podravska Moslavina in Croatia, respectively) – and estates laid there. Nevertheless Egidius was removed from power, and a member of the clan's Újlak branch, Ugrin Csák established a provincial domination and ruled over Upper Syrmia, ensuring the southern areas of the Csák baronial group against the Gutkeled's territory.

After his fall, Egidius was mentioned only tangentially in contemporary sources, for instance in 1283 during negotiation over a possession sale among the clan members. Egidius and Gregory owned Álmosd in Bihar County in 1291. Egidius was among the many Hungarian barons and prelates who took part in the peace negotiations at Pressburg between King Andrew III of Hungary and Duke Albert of Austria to conclude the Austrian–Hungarian War in August 1291. His brother died by 1294, when Egidius lamented over his death while entrusting the chaplain of Pécs to contribute in donation of Monoszlós' estates within the kindred.

Egidius Monoszló was one of the last surviving barons who participated in the 1260s war and who were members of the feudal anarchy's first generation. As he had no legitimate heirs, he made his first will and testament in 1298, when formally adopted his maternal relatives from the gens Bő, Peter, Count of the Székelys from 1294 to 1300, and Michael, who later served as Archbishop of Esztergom between 1303 and 1304. Egidius donated Darnóc Castle (today Slatinski Drenovac, Croatia) to them, however both Peter and Michael had died before Egidius. In 1308, Egidius changed his last will and testament, when his son-in-law, Nicholas Aba and his brothers (John, James and Peter) from the Nyék branch were granted Darnóc. Egidius was a staunch supporter of Charles I during his struggle for the Hungarian throne. Historian Pál Engel claimed Egidius participated in that royal campaign, belonging to Charles' entourage, where waged war against oligarch Matthew III Csák, who ruled de facto independently the north-western counties of Hungary. Charles captured Nagyszombat in early 1313. There lying on his deathbed, Egidius made his final testament at the local Franciscan friary. On 11 March 1313, Archbishop Thomas presented the document, thus Egidius died a few days earlier. According to his intention, his widow and minor orphan daughters were supposed to inherit the whole Atyina and Novák lordship in Slavonia. Egidius donated Nagylak (today Nădlac, Romania) to the Archdiocese of Esztergom, while Szond, Bács County (today Sonta, Serbia) became a property of his other son-in-law, Philip Kórógyi and his ambitious family. According to his last will, his another son-in-law Nicholas Felsőlendvai was granted the castle Rupoly (near Kaposvár) in Somogy County.

However around the fulfillment of Egidius' will, there were difficulties. After his death, Matthew Csák took the Fülek Castle and annexed it to his province. According to a royal charter issued by Charles I on 22 May 1317, the oligarch John Kőszegi demanded Atyina for his family in accordance with the right of escheatage. However Nicholas Aba and his brothers, in addition to Darnóc, acquired the whole Atyina and Novák lordship in Slavonia, thus they became ancestors of the Atyinai family. Kőszegi captured and imprisoned Nicholas and Peter Aba (or Atyinai) shortly thereafter. In the first half of 1314, Nicholas was taken tied up before the Atyina Castle and dragged along the walls at the heels of a horse to persuade the defenders to surrender the fort. Despite this, John Kőszegi was unable to capture Atyina and took Nicholas back to prison, who languished in captivity in the subsequent three years. Following that Charles I launched a campaign against the Kőszegis in Transdanubia and Slavonia in the first half of 1316. By the autumn of 1317, John Kőszegi was defeated, thus Nicholas was able to return to the recaptured Atyina.

== Sources ==
- Engel, Pál (1988). "Az ország újraegyesítése. I. Károly küzdelmei az oligarchák ellen (1310–1323) [Reunification of the Realm. The Struggles of Charles I Against the Oligarchs (1310–1323)]". Századok (in Hungarian). 122 (1–2). Magyar Történelmi Társulat: 89–146. ISSN 0039-8098.
- Kádár, Tamás (2009). "Egy rejtélyes politikai gyilkosság és háttere a XIII. század végi Magyarországon: Béla macsói és boszniai herceg pályája [A Mysterious Political Murder and its Background at the End of 13th Century in Hungary: Career of Béla, Duke of Macsó and Bosnia]". Fons (in Hungarian). 16 (4). Szentpétery Imre Történettudományi Alapítvány: 411–429. ISSN 1217-8020.
- Kádár, Tamás (2020). "Az 1272. évi székesfehérvári "palotaforradalom" [The "Palace Revolution" of 1272 in Székesfehérvár]". Aetas (in Hungarian). 35 (2). AETAS Könyv- és Lapkiadó Egyesület: 49–65. ISSN 0237-7934.
- Kovács, Mihai (2015). ""Semper meliora prospiciuntur et utiliora attenduntur". Monoszló nb. Péter erdélyi püspök társadalmi és politikai kapcsolatai ["Semper meliora prospiciuntur et utiliora attenduntur" Political and Social Relationships of Peter Monoszló Bishop of Transylvania]" (PDF). Erdélyi Múzeum (in Hungarian). 77 (1): 1–13. ISSN 1453-0961.
- Markó, László (2006). A magyar állam főméltóságai Szent Istvántól napjainkig: Életrajzi Lexikon [Great Officers of State in Hungary from King Saint Stephen to Our Days: A Biographical Encyclopedia] (in Hungarian). Helikon Kiadó. ISBN 963-208-970-7.
- Rudolf, Veronika (2023). Közép-Európa a hosszú 13. században [Central Europe in the Long 13th Century] (in Hungarian). Arpadiana XV., Research Centre for the Humanities. ISBN 978-963-416-406-7.
- Szűcs, Jenő (1993). Az utolsó Árpádok [The Last Árpáds] (in Hungarian). História, MTA Történettudományi Intézete. ISBN 963-8311-96-7.
- Zsoldos, Attila (2005). Az Árpádok és asszonyaik. A királynéi intézmény az Árpádok korában [The Árpáds and their Women: The Institution of Queenship in the Era of the Árpáds] (in Hungarian). MTA Történettudományi Intézete. ISBN 963 8312 98 X.
- Zsoldos, Attila (2007). Családi ügy: IV. Béla és István ifjabb király viszálya az 1260-as években [A family affair: The Conflict between Béla IV and Junior King Stephen in the 1260s] (in Hungarian). História, MTA Történettudományi Intézete. ISBN 978-963-9627-15-4.
- Zsoldos, Attila (2011). Magyarország világi archontológiája, 1000–1301 [Secular Archontology of Hungary, 1000–1301] (in Hungarian). História, MTA Történettudományi Intézete. ISBN 978-963-9627-38-3.

Egidius II Genus Monoszló Born: 1240s Died: March 1313
Political offices
Preceded by Maurice Pok	Master of the treasury 1270–1272	Succeeded by Ernye Ákos
Preceded by Stephen Csák	Ispán of Pozsony; 1270–1272	Succeeded by Ladislaus Kán
Preceded by Stephen Gutkeled	Ban of Bosnia; 1273	Succeeded by Stephen Gutkeled
Preceded by Roland Rátót	Ban of Macsó; 1273	Succeeded by John
Preceded by Stephen Gutkeled	Ban of Bosnia; 1273	Succeeded by Ugrin Csák
Preceded by John	Ban of Macsó; 1273	Succeeded by Albert Ákos (?)
Preceded by Joachim Gutkeled	Master of the treasury 1274–1275	Succeeded by Joachim Gutkeled
