= Gregory III Monoszló =

Hungarian lord

Gregory (III) Monoszló

Judge of the Cumans
- Reign: 1269
- Predecessor: first known
- Successor: Mojs (as Palatine)
- Born: c. 1240
- Died: between 1291 and 1294
- Noble family: gens Monoszló
- Spouse: Queen Elizabeth's sister
- Father: Gregory II
- Mother: N Bő

Gregory (III) from the kindred Monoszló (Hungarian: Monoszló nembeli (III.) Gergely; c. 1240 – between 1291 and 1294) was a Hungarian lord, who served as the first known Judge of the Cumans in 1269. Through his marriage, he was a relative of the royal Árpád dynasty.

== Family background ==
Gregory III was born into the gens Monoszló around 1240 as the son of Gregory II, who functioned as ispán of Krassó County in 1255. His mother was an unidentified noblewoman from the gens Bő, possibly the daughter of Ders. His grandfather was Thomas I, the Ban of Slavonia between 1228 and 1229. Gregory had two brothers, Egidius II, who served as Master of the treasury several times, and Peter, who functioned as Bishop of Transylvania from 1270 to 1307. Despite his direct royal kinship relations, Gregory's career was overshadowed by his elder brother, the more ambitious and capable Egidius. The three brothers supported each other in national politics and gradually distinguished themselves from the other branches of the Monoszló kindred. This intention also appeared in contemporary documents and charters, when their names were referred with the suffixes "de genere Thome bani" ("from Ban Thomas' kindred"), and later "de Filek", when the eldest one, Egidius was granted Fülek Castle (today Fiľakovo, Slovakia) by his lord, Duke Stephen.

Gregory became a relative of the royal House of Árpád, when he married an unidentified sister of Duke Stephen's consort, Elizabeth the Cuman. Elizabeth, and Gregory's wife most possibly were the daughters of Seyhan, a Cuman chieftain. The marriage of Gregory and the Cuman lady presumably occurred in the mid-1260s, as, according to a 1274 royal charter issued by Elizabeth's son, Ladislaus IV of Hungary, Elizabeth had previously donated the queenly estate of Pány (today Paňovce, Slovakia) to her sister, which area then belonged to her husband, Stephen's realm, who, adopting the title of Junior King, forced his father, King Béla IV of Hungary to cede all the lands of the Kingdom of Hungary to the east of the Danube to him. Later, in 1274, Ladislaus IV confiscated his aunt's estate in exchange for Kárán, Somogy County, which laid near to the Monoszlós' lands. Historian János Karácsonyi claimed, Elizabeth and her unidentified sister were the siblings of Bulgarian Despot Jacob Svetoslav, who rebelled against his father-in-law, Stephen's rule, and after the victorious Hungarian campaign in 1266, Egidius Monoszló, who captured Tirnovo, took the Despot's sister to marry with his younger brother, Gregory as pledge of the peace.

== Career ==
Belonging to his kinship, Gregory was unflinchingly loyal to Duke Stephen, who launched a civil war against his father, Béla IV in 1264. However there is no source whether he actively participated battles or held any specific offices in Stephen's royal court. In 1269, Gregory was mentioned twice as Judge of the Cumans, becoming the first known person who held that dignity. Earlier archontological and historical works identified the office-holder with his father, Gregory II. However historian Attila Zsoldos argued the last mention of Gregory II is from 1256, and there is no record of him about his role in the 1260s civil war or any political relation with Duke Stephen. Contrary to him, as Zsoldos noted, Gregory III belonged to the court of his sister-in-law's husband, Duke Stephen, and had a Cuman wife. In the two documents, Gregory, as Judge of the Cumans – after the conclusion of the war – appeared before the elderly Béla IV in the royal court to negotiate over Slavonian estate matters with his cousins, Thomas III and Stephen II, and a distant relative, Nicholas.

After Béla's death, Stephen V succeeded his father without difficulties and was crowned on or after 17 May 1270. Mojs, the newly-appointed Palatine of Hungary adopted the title Judge of the Cumans, merging the two dignities. In the same time, Gregory was made Master of the treasury for his sister-in-law, Queen Elizabeth (while his brother, Egidius held the same office in the royal court of Stephen V). Beside that, Gregory also became ispán of Vas County. In this capacity, Gregory had important role in the emerging armed conflict between Stephen V and Ottokar II of Bohemia. After Stephen's coronation, the closest advisors of the late Béla, for instance Henry Kőszegi and Nicholas Geregye, following the new monarch's sister, Anna of Macsó, fled Hungary and handed over Kőszeg, Borostyánkő (today Bernstein, Austria) and their other castles in Vas County, along the western borders to Ottokar II. Then Stephen V launched a plundering raid into Styria around December 1270. Gregory was one of the commanders of the royal army against the Bohemian king. In the next year, Nicholas Geregye returned Hungary and swore loyalty to Stephen after the Peace of Pressburg, which signed on 2 July 1271. In accordance with the treaty, common Austrian–Hungarian commissions were established to determine the borders and to resolve the disputes between the neighboring lords. As ispán of Vas County, Gregory (together with Panyit Miskol who governed Zala County) took part in this process along the border with the Duchy of Styria, negotiating with the captains and notaries of the aforementioned province. Though Ottokar renounced its claims on territories conquered in Hungary, the Kőszegis, strengthening with Bohemian and Styrian defenders, refused to give back their castles along the western border. As a result, Gregory led a royal army to successfully besiege and capture Henry Kőszegi's four castles – Kőszeg, Szalónak (Stadtschlaining), Szentvid and Borostyánkő – in August 1271.

The Ban of Slavonia, Joachim Gutkeled, turned against Stephen V and kidnapped his ten-year old son and heir, Ladislaus in the summer of 1272. Stephen besieged Joachim's fortress in Koprivnica, but could not free his son. The king soon fell ill and died on 6 August 1272, thus the Monoszló brothers lost their patron. Joachim Gutkeled departed for Székesfehérvár as soon as he was informed of Stephen V's death, because he wanted to arrange Ladislaus' coronation. Gregory's sister-in-law, Dowager Queen Elizabeth joined him, infuriating Stephen V's partisans who accused her of having conspired against her husband. Gregory's brother, Egidius immediately laid siege in late August to Elizabeth's estate in Székesfehérvár to "rescue" Ladislaus from the rival baronial group's influence. However the military action ended in failure. Egidius and Gregory "fear of the Queen's revenge", fled to Pressburg (today Bratislava, Slovakia). They captured the castle and its surrounding areas and handed over to Ottokar II who provided shelter to them. Their Hungarian lands were confiscated following that by Queen Elizabeth in the name of his son. The Monoszló brothers were granted the Austrian castles of Laa, Stockerau, Korneuburg and Kreuzenstein by Ottokar, who also commissioned them to administrate Pressburg and the adjacent forts.

Following the Bohemian invasion of Hungary in April 1273, Egidius and Gregory fled Prague for Hungary and swore loyalty to Ladislaus IV, thus received forgiveness from Elizabeth and the Monoszlós' confiscated lands were regained (Gregory was granted Kárán then). He was re-appointed ispán of Vas County, and simultaneously also served as head of Požega County until 1273. In this capacity, he fought against Ottokar's troops at Győr, participating in the recapture of the episcopal stronghold. Gregory led the defense against the Bohemian invasion in Vas County during the war. Later, Gregory initiated the ennoblement of numerous castle warriors, who bravely fought against the invaders (e.g. in Köcsk and Káld), in the royal court of Ladislaus IV. However the rival baronial group, dominated by the Kőszegi and the Gutkeled clans, regained its influence and, among others, Gregory was dismissed from his office in the autumn of 1274. Both Egidius and Gregory lost all political influence for uncertain reasons after 1275, as they had never hold any dignities after that, despite the fact that their allies, the Csák group was able to return to govern the realm even at the end of the year. They jointly owned Álmosd in Bihar County in 1291. Gregory died childless by 1294.

== Sources ==
- Jakubovich, Emil (1922–23). "Kún Erzsébet nőtestvére [Elizabeth the Cuman's sister]". Turul (in Hungarian). 37: 14–27. ISSN 1216-7258.
- Kádár, Tamás (2020). "Az 1272. évi székesfehérvári "palotaforradalom" [The "Palace Revolution" of 1272 in Székesfehérvár]". Aetas (in Hungarian). 35 (2). AETAS Könyv- és Lapkiadó Egyesület: 49–65. ISSN 0237-7934.
- Kovács, Mihai (2015). ""Semper meliora prospiciuntur et utiliora attenduntur". Monoszló nb. Péter erdélyi püspök társadalmi és politikai kapcsolatai ["Semper meliora prospiciuntur et utiliora attenduntur" Political and Social Relationships of Peter Monoszló Bishop of Transylvania]" (PDF). Erdélyi Múzeum (in Hungarian). 77 (1): 1–13. ISSN 1453-0961.
- Rudolf, Veronika (2023). Közép-Európa a hosszú 13. században [Central Europe in the Long 13th Century] (in Hungarian). Arpadiana XV., Research Centre for the Humanities. ISBN 978-963-416-406-7.
- Szűcs, Jenő (1993). Az utolsó Árpádok [The Last Árpáds] (in Hungarian). História, MTA Történettudományi Intézete. ISBN 963-8311-96-7.
- Tatár, Sarolta (2013). "A rábaközi besenyő ispánság szervezete és fennállása [The Organization and Duration of the Pecheneg Comitatus of Rábaköz]". In Kahler, Frigyes; Bank, Barbara (eds.). Utak és útkereszteződések. Ünnepi tanulmányok M. Kiss Sándor tiszteletére (in Hungarian). Történelmi Ismeretterjesztő Társulat Egyesület. pp. 33–42. ISBN 978-963-89727-1-2.
- Zsoldos, Attila (2007). Családi ügy: IV. Béla és István ifjabb király viszálya az 1260-as években [A family affair: The Conflict between Béla IV and Junior King Stephen in the 1260s] (in Hungarian). História, MTA Történettudományi Intézete. ISBN 978-963-9627-15-4.
- Zsoldos, Attila (2009). "Miklós országbíró [Judge royal Nicholas]". In Neumann, Tibor; Rácz, György (eds.). Honoris causa. Tanulmányok Engel Pál tiszteletére (Analecta mediaevalia III) (in Hungarian). PPKE Történettudományi Intézete. pp. 519–549. ISBN 978-963-9627-25-3.
- Zsoldos, Attila (2011). Magyarország világi archontológiája, 1000–1301 [Secular Archontology of Hungary, 1000–1301] (in Hungarian). História, MTA Történettudományi Intézete. ISBN 978-963-9627-38-3.

Gregory III Genus Monoszló Born: 1240s Died: before 1294
Political offices
Preceded by first known	Judge of the Cumans; 1269	Succeeded by Mojs as Palatine
