= Monoszló (genus) =

Clan of Slavonian-origin in the Kingdom of Hungary

Genus (gens) Monoszló
- Country: Kingdom of Hungary
- Founded: late 12th century
- Dissolution: c. 1338
- Cadet branches: House of Csupor

Monoszló (also Monozlo) was the name of a Slavonian-origin genus (Latin for "clan"; nemzetség in Hungarian) in the Kingdom of Hungary. Several prominent secular dignitaries came from this kindred.

== Origins ==
The unidentified ancestor of the kindred received the estate of Monoszló (today Podravska Moslavina, Croatia) in Križevci County in Slavonia from Béla III of Hungary. There he was also granted the right of marturina, a type of tax in Slavonia which was collected in the then highly valued marten skins. As János Karácsonyi wrote, he had four children because Monoszló was divided into four parts in 1231 according to a property contract. One of them was Macarius, who served as ispán (head) of Szolnok County from 1192 to 1193. By 1196, he owned Szond, Bács County (today Sonta, Serbia) and married a daughter of Peter Győr from the Szenterzsébet branch.

== Family tree ==
- N.
  - Macarius I (fl. 1192–1196), ispán of Szolnok County (1192–1193)
    - Thomas I (fl. 1202–1231), ispán of Valkó County (1221), Ban of Slavonia (1228–1229)
      - Gregory II (fl. 1237–1256), ispán of Krassó County (1255), married a lady from the gens Bő
        - Egidius II (fl. 1265–1313; d. 1313), Master of the treasury (1270–1272; 1274–1275), Ban of Bosnia (1273), Ban of Macsó (1273); married Catherine from the gens Kökényes-Radnót
          - daughter (fl. 1313), married Philip Kórógyi
          - daughter (fl. 1313), married Nicholas Aba from the Nyék branch
          - daughter (fl. 1313–1334), married Stephen II Borsa
          - daughter (fl. 1313), married Nicholas Felsőlendvai
        - Gregory III (fl. 1270–1291; d. before 1294), Judge of the Cumans (1269), ispán of Vas County (1270–1272; 1273–1274), married an unidentified sister of Queen Elizabeth the Cuman
        - Peter II (fl. 1266–1307; d. 1307), Bishop of Transylvania (1270–1307)
      - Nabut (fl. 1237–1283), married James Héder
      - daughter (fl. 1237)
      - daughter (fl. 1237)
      - daughter (fl. 1237)
      - Thomas II (fl. 1237–1247)
        - Thomas III (fl. 1256–1283)
          - Kosa ((fl. 1328)
        - Stephen II (fl. 1256–1293)
          - Nicholas IV (fl. 1328–1338)
          - Stephen "Csupor" III ((fl. 1328–1338), ancestor of the Csupor family
    - Nicholas I (fl. 1217–1231)
    - Stephen I (fl. 1217–1231)
      - Macarius II (d. before 1247)
        - sons (d. before 1247)
        - Venys (fl. 1256), married Mojs I
  - N.
    - Gregory I (d. before 1231)
    - daughter (d. before 1231)
    - daughter (d. before 1231)
  - N.
    - Egidius I (fl. 1231)
      - Peter I
        - Peter III (fl. 1247–1316)
    - Nicholas II
      - Andrew (fl. 1231–1247)
        - Nicholas III (fl. 1256–1272), Judge royal (1270–1272), Master of the horse (1272)
          - Lawrence (fl. 1283–1288)
          - Egidius III (fl. 1283–1288)
        - Kenéz (fl. 1256–1257)
  - N.

== Sources ==
- Karácsonyi, János (1901). A magyar nemzetségek a XIV. század közepéig. II. kötet [The Hungarian genera until the middle of the 14th century, Vol. 2] (in Hungarian). Hungarian Academy of Sciences.
- Kovács, Mihai (2015). ""Semper meliora prospiciuntur et utiliora attenduntur". Monoszló nb. Péter erdélyi püspök társadalmi és politikai kapcsolatai ["Semper meliora prospiciuntur et utiliora attenduntur" Political and Social Relationships of Peter Monoszló Bishop of Transylvania]" (PDF). Erdélyi Múzeum (in Hungarian). 77 (1): 1–13. ISSN 1453-0961.
- Zsoldos, Attila (2011). Magyarország világi archontológiája, 1000–1301 [Secular Archontology of Hungary, 1000–1301] (in Hungarian). História, MTA Történettudományi Intézete. ISBN 978-963-9627-38-3.
