= Macarius Monoszló =

Macarius (I) Monoszló

Ispán of Szolnok
- Reign: 1192–1193
- Predecessor: Fulko
- Successor: Hermo
- Noble family: gens Monoszló
- Spouse: N Győr
- Issue: Thomas I Nicholas I Stephen I
- Father: unidentified

Macarius (I) from the kindred Monoszló (Hungarian: Monoszló nembeli (I.) Makariás) was a Hungarian noble, the first known member of the gens Monoszló.

== Career ==
His unidentified father, the ancestor of the kindred received the estate of Monoszló (today Podravska Moslavina, Croatia) in Križevci County in Slavonia from Béla III of Hungary. There he also granted the right of marturina, a type of tax in Croatia which was collected in the then highly valued marten skins. Macarius was one of his four sons and the only one who is known by name.

Macarius owned Szond, Bács County (today Sonta, Serbia) by 1196 and married a daughter of Peter Győr from the Szenterzsébet branch. He served as ispán (head) of Szolnok County around from 1192 to 1193, during the late reign of Béla III. It is possible that he was identical with that Macarius, who held the dignity of vice-ban of Primorje in 1189.

He had at least three sons from his marriage. Thomas I became a prominent supporter of Duke Andrew and participated in his rebellion against King Emeric. Andrew II later made Thomas his Ban of Slavonia in 1228. Nicholas I and Stephen I remained only landowners in the county without political significance, their branches became extinct by the 1250s.

== Sources ==
- Karácsonyi, János (1901). A magyar nemzetségek a XIV. század közepéig. II. kötet [The Hungarian genera until the middle of the 14th century, Vol. 2] (in Hungarian). Hungarian Academy of Sciences.
- Kovács, Mihai (2015). ""Semper meliora prospiciuntur et utiliora attenduntur". Monoszló nb. Péter erdélyi püspök társadalmi és politikai kapcsolatai ["Semper meliora prospiciuntur et utiliora attenduntur" Political and Social Relationships of Peter Monoszló Bishop of Transylvania]" (PDF). Erdélyi Múzeum (in Hungarian). 77 (1): 1–13. ISSN 1453-0961.
- Zsoldos, Attila (2011). Magyarország világi archontológiája, 1000–1301 [Secular Archontology of Hungary, 1000–1301] (in Hungarian). História, MTA Történettudományi Intézete. ISBN 978-963-9627-38-3.

Macarius I Genus Monoszló Born: ? Died: ?
Political offices
| Preceded by Fulko | Ispán of Szolnok; 1192–1193 | Succeeded by Hermo |
