= Gregory II Monoszló =

Hungarian noble

Gregory (II) Monoszló

Ispán of Krassó
- Reign: 1255
- Predecessor: Sebes
- Successor: Anselmus
- Died: after 1256
- Noble family: gens Monoszló
- Spouse: N Bő
- Issue: Egidius II; Gregory III; Peter II
- Father: Thomas I

Gregory (II) from the kindred Monoszló (Hungarian: Monoszló nembeli (II.) Gergely; died after 1256) was a Hungarian noble, who served as ispán of Krassó County in 1255.

== Biography ==
Gregory II was born into the gens Monoszló as the son of Thomas I, who functioned as ispán of Valkó County (1221) and Ban of Slavonia (1228–1229). He also had a brother, Thomas II, the ancestor of the Csupor family, and at least four sisters, including Nabut, who married James from the Héder clan.

He married an unidentified noblewoman from the gens Bő, and was father of three notable barons, Egidius II, Gregory III and prelate Peter II.

Gregory was first mentioned by contemporary sources in 1237, when he shared his inherited property with Thomas II, possibly immediately after their father's death. Later, in 1244, he bought the village of Füzegy, near to Szond in Bács County (Vizić and Sonta in Serbia, respectively), but soon, in 1252, he had to sell that to the Archdiocese of Kalocsa due to its right of pre-emption. He served as ispán of Krassó County in 1255, during the reign of Béla IV of Hungary. Earlier archontological and historical works identified him with that Gregory, who functioned as the first known Judge of the Cumans in 1269. Historian Attila Zsoldos, however, notes, the last mention of Gregory II is from 1256, and there is no record of him about his role in the 1260s civil war. Contrary to Gregory II, his namesake son, Gregory III was a loyal supporter of Duke Stephen, who ruled over the Cuman territories, and through his marriage, he also became brother-in-law of Elizabeth the Cuman, spouse of Stephen.

== Sources ==
- Karácsonyi, János (1901). A magyar nemzetségek a XIV. század közepéig. II. kötet [The Hungarian genera until the middle of the 14th century, Vol. 2] (in Hungarian). Hungarian Academy of Sciences.
- Kovács, Mihai (2015). ""Semper meliora prospiciuntur et utiliora attenduntur". Monoszló nb. Péter erdélyi püspök társadalmi és politikai kapcsolatai ["Semper meliora prospiciuntur et utiliora attenduntur" Political and Social Relationships of Peter Monoszló Bishop of Transylvania]" (PDF). Erdélyi Múzeum (in Hungarian). 77 (1): 1–13. ISSN 1453-0961.
- Zsoldos, Attila (2009). "Miklós országbíró [Judge royal Nicholas]". In Neumann, Tibor; Rácz, György (eds.). Honoris causa. Tanulmányok Engel Pál tiszteletére (Analecta mediaevalia III) (in Hungarian). PPKE Történettudományi Intézete. pp. 519–549. ISBN 978-963-9627-25-3.
- Zsoldos, Attila (2011). Magyarország világi archontológiája, 1000–1301 [Secular Archontology of Hungary, 1000–1301] (in Hungarian). História, MTA Történettudományi Intézete. ISBN 978-963-9627-38-3.

Gregory II Genus Monoszló Born: ? Died: after 1256
Political offices
Preceded by Sebes	Ispán of Krassó; 1255	Succeeded by Anselmus
