= Torysa =

Torysa may refer to:

- Torysa (river), river in Slovakia
- Torysa (village), village in Sabinov District, Slovakia
