= John of Macsó =

John

Ban of Macsó
- Reign: 1273
- Predecessor: Egidius Monoszló
- Successor: Egidius Monoszló

John (Hungarian: János) was a Hungarian distinguished nobleman, who served as ban of Macsó in 1273, during the reign of Ladislaus IV of Hungary.

== Sources ==
- (in Hungarian) Zsoldos, Attila (2011). Magyarország világi archontológiája, 1000–1301 ("Secular Archontology of Hungary, 1000–1301"). História, MTA Történettudományi Intézete. Budapest. ISBN 978-963-9627-38-3

Political offices
Preceded by Egidius Monoszló	Ban of Macsó; 1273	Succeeded by Egidius Monoszló
