= Thomas Monoszló =

Hungarian noble

Thomas (I) Monoszló

Ban of Slavonia
- Reign: 1228–1229
- Predecessor: Solomon Atyusz
- Successor: Julius Kán
- Died: between 1231 and 1237
- Noble family: gens Monoszló
- Issue: Gregory II; Thomas II; Nabut
- Father: Macarius I
- Mother: N Győr

Thomas (I) from the kindred Monoszló (Hungarian: Monoszló nembeli (I.) Tamás; died between 1231 and 1237) was a Hungarian noble, who served as Ban of Slavonia from 1228 to 1229.

== Family ==
Thomas I was born into the gens Monoszló as the son of Macarius I, who functioned as ispán of Szolnok County between 1192 and 1193. His mother was an unidentified daughter of Peter Győr from the Szenterzsébet branch. He had two brothers, Nicholas I and Stephen I, who remained only lesser Slavonian landowners without political significance.

He had six known children from his unidentified wife. His son, Gregory II served as ispán of Krassó County around 1255 and was father of three notable barons, Egidius II, Gregory III and prelate Peter II. His second son, Thomas II remained marginal among his contemporaries, but the influential 14–15th-century Csupor family descended from his line. Thomas I also had at least four daughters, three of them are unidentified, while Nabut married James from the Héder clan, a great-grandson of Palatine Héder, and was still alive in 1283.

== Career ==
Thomas was a long-time supporter of Duke Andrew, who rebelled against the realm of his brother, King Emeric at several times. He was present, when Andrew planned a new rebellion against Emeric, but the king walked into his brother's camp unarmed and captured him without resistance near Varaždin in October 1203. Alongside Andrew, Thomas was held in captivity for months, but the Duke's supporters released them in early 1204. After Andrew's ascension to the Hungarian throne in May 1205, Thomas was promoted to a royal knight. He participated and seriously wounded in one of Andrew's military campaign against Halych in late 1200s. When Andrew II led the Fifth Crusade to the Holy Land from 1217 to 1218, a group of barons took advantage of the situation and rebelled against the king, but Thomas remained loyal to Andrew when the kingdom was in a constant state of anarchy during the king's absence.

He served as ispán of Valkó County in 1221. In the next year, already a certain Cosmas held that office. He fought in Coloman's campaign against the Principality of Halych which ended in defeat. From 1228 to 1229, Thomas functioned as Ban of Slavonia under Coloman, who adopted the title Duke of Slavonia earlier in 1226. Based on a non-authentic royal charter with authentic list of dignitaries from 1219, it is possible Thomas served as Ban of Slavonia in that year, instead of the second half of the 1220s (or he could bore the office twice during his career). For his merits, Thomas was granted lands in Bács, Csanád and Valkó Counties, as well as the lucrative fishpond in Zagreb. As sole secular nobleman, Thomas also received permission from Andrew II to trade salt with six riverboats across the Maros (Mureș) at three times a year. In 1231, Thomas spun off his own lands from the kindred's property. He died before 1237, when his four daughters were still maidens.

== Sources ==
- B. Halász, Éva (2019). "A fantombánok nyomában - avagy kik voltak a bánok? [Who were the bans?]". Acta Universitatis Szegediensis. Acta Historica (in Hungarian). 144. MTA-SZTE-MOL Magyar Medievisztikai Kutatócsoport: 43–50. ISSN 0324-6965.
- Karácsonyi, János (1901). A magyar nemzetségek a XIV. század közepéig. II. kötet [The Hungarian genera until the middle of the 14th century, Vol. 2] (in Hungarian). Hungarian Academy of Sciences.
- Kovács, Mihai (2015). ""Semper meliora prospiciuntur et utiliora attenduntur". Monoszló nb. Péter erdélyi püspök társadalmi és politikai kapcsolatai ["Semper meliora prospiciuntur et utiliora attenduntur" Political and Social Relationships of Peter Monoszló Bishop of Transylvania]" (PDF). Erdélyi Múzeum (in Hungarian). 77 (1): 1–13. ISSN 1453-0961.
- Markó, László (2006). A magyar állam főméltóságai Szent Istvántól napjainkig: Életrajzi Lexikon [Great Officers of State in Hungary from King Saint Stephen to Our Days: A Biographical Encyclopedia] (in Hungarian). Helikon Kiadó. ISBN 963-208-970-7.
- Zsoldos, Attila (2011). Magyarország világi archontológiája, 1000–1301 [Secular Archontology of Hungary, 1000–1301] (in Hungarian). História, MTA Történettudományi Intézete. ISBN 978-963-9627-38-3.

Thomas I Genus Monoszló Born: ? Died: 1230s
Political offices
Preceded by Solomon Atyusz	Ban of Slavonia; 1228–1229	Succeeded by Julius Kán
