= Peter Monoszló =

Hungarian prelate

Peter (II) Monoszló
- Bishop of Transylvania
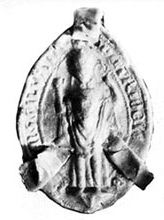
- Installed: 1270
- Term ended: 1307
- Predecessor: Gallus
- Successor: Benedict

Personal details
- Born: 1240s
- Died: 27 November 1307
- Buried: St. Michael's Cathedral
- Denomination: Catholic
- Parents: Gregory II Monoszló; N Bő

Peter (II) from the kindred Monoszló (Hungarian: Monoszló nembeli (II.) Péter; 1240s – 27 November 1307) was a Hungarian prelate, who served as the Bishop of Transylvania from 1270 until his death. The current St. Michael's Cathedral in Gyulafehérvár (today Alba Iulia, Romania) was built during his term.

== Early life ==
Peter was born into the gens Monoszló around 1240 as the son of Gregory II, who functioned as ispán of Krassó County in 1255. His mother was an unidentified noblewoman from the gens Bő, possibly the daughter of Ders. His grandfather was Thomas I, the Ban of Slavonia between 1228 and 1229. Peter had two brothers, Egidius II, who served as Master of the treasury several times, and Gregory III, who was a relative of the royal Árpád dynasty through his marriage. The three brothers supported each other in national politics and gradually distinguished themselves from the other branches of the Monoszló kindred. This intention also appeared in contemporary documents and charters, when their names were referred with the suffixes "de genere Thome bani" ("from Ban Thomas' kindred"), and later "de Filek", when the eldest one, Egidius was granted Fülek Castle (today Fiľakovo, Slovakia) by his lord, Duke Stephen.

As the youngest of three brothers, Peter entered ecclesiastical career. It is unknown whether he attended a foreign university or was a pupil at the clerical school in Veszprém. Nevertheless, he was first mentioned as "magister" which confirmed his literacy. In the emerging 1260s civil war between Stephen and his father, King Béla IV, the Monoszló clan, including Peter remained loyal to the Duke. Peter held the office of vice-chancellor at Duke Stephen's court since 1266, replacing Lodomer. He served in that capacity until 1270, when Stephen ascended the Hungarian throne. Due to the activity of Stephen's chancellery, the literacy spread across Transylvania, following the other parts of the realm. Utilizing his past experience, Peter organized the first permanent episcopal chancellery in the province after he became bishop.

== Bishop of Transylvania ==
=== First years ===
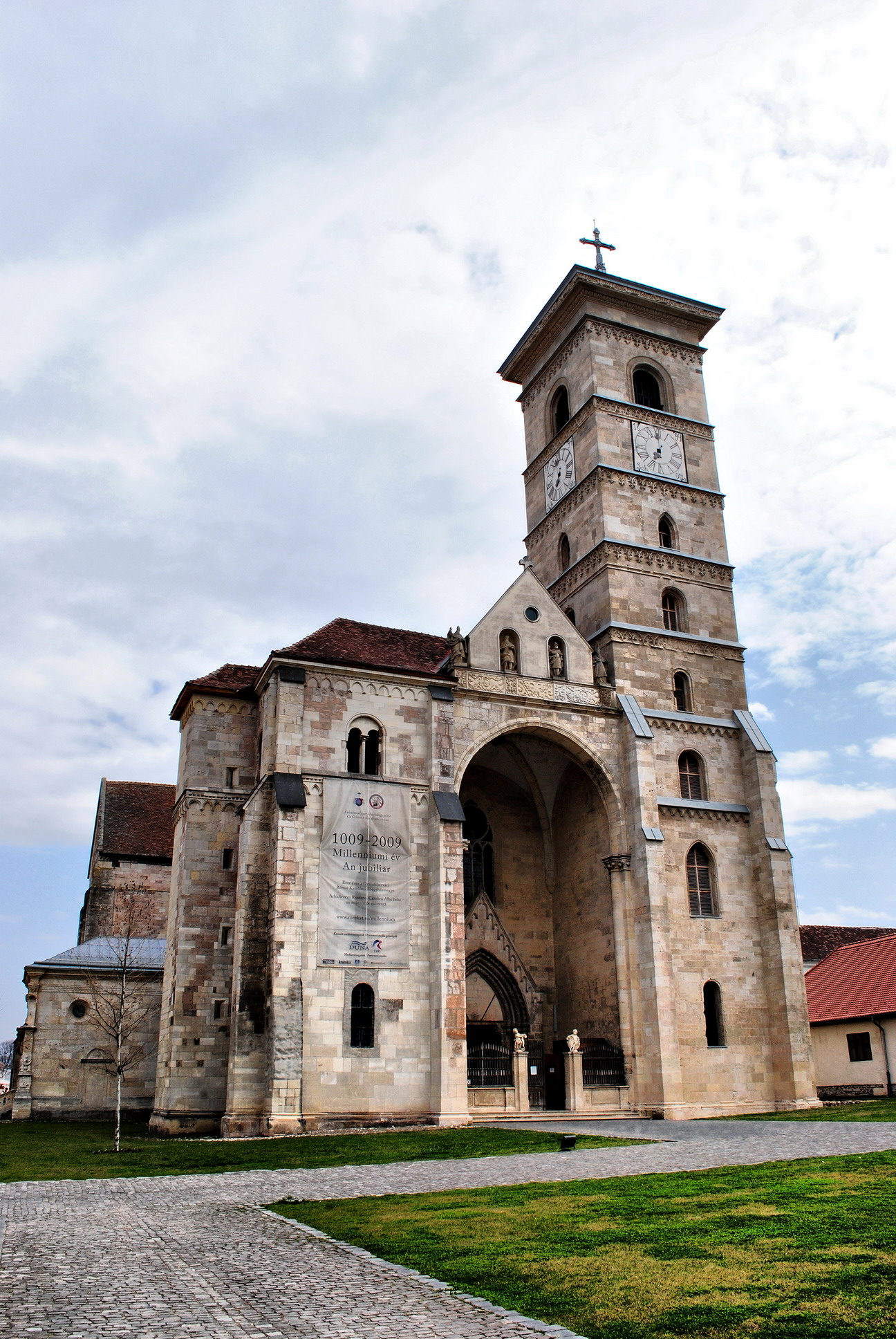
The St. Michael's Cathedral, built by Peter Monoszló

Peter was elected Bishop of Transylvania still before the death of Béla IV, presumably in early 1270. His election was confirmed by the 1268–71 papal conclave by 13 June 1270. The new monarch, Stephen V rewarded the prelate's faithfulness for several years, when donated Kolozsvár (today Cluj-Napoca, Romania) and its surrounding areas to the Diocese of Transylvania, in addition to terra Obruth (today in Abrud, Romania) which was owned by the Transylvanian Chapter after 1271, according to later charters issued by Ladislaus IV and voivode Matthew Csák, respectively. With the acquisition of Kolozsvár, Peter Monoszló encircled the landholdings of the bishopric's long-time rival, the Kolozsmonostor Abbey (today Cluj-Mănăștur, Romania), forcing the Benedictine friars for unfavorable estate transfers and exchanges. Peter established a contiguous bishopric lordship in the western parts of Kolozs County; for instance he exchanged the lands of Piski (Hunyad County) and Akmár (Fehér County) for Körösfő in Kolozs County (present-day Izvoru Crișului, Romania) in 1276. The bishop also owned the nearby Kapus (Căpușu Mare) by 1282.

When Stephen V fell ill and died on 6 August 1272, it marked the beginning of the era of feudal anarchy, when two rival baronial groups struggled for power during the minority of Ladislaus IV under his mother, Elizabeth's regency. Peter, along with his kindred, supported the Csák league against the Kőszegi–Gutkeled–Geregye faction. Peter's brothers, Egidius and Gregory laid siege in late August to the Dowager Queen's palace in Székesfehérvár to "rescue" Ladislaus from the rival baronial group's influence. After the failure, they fled Hungary and handed over Pressburg (today Bratislava, Slovakia) to Ottokar II of Bohemia. Peter did not participate in his brothers' conspiracy, but became disgraced before the royal court, losing any support and further donations to the diocese. From 1272, Nicholas Geregye served as Voivode of Transylvania. His clan had aspirations to establish dominion independently from the royal power. Both Peter and his strong ally, Lodomer, Bishop of Várad opposed this ambition. Nicholas Geregye went through major difficulties to control Transylvania due to the counterbalancing activity of provincial authorities, Peter Monoszló and Matthew Csák. Sălăgean argues that the bishop "caught in a rather reserved attitude" towards the Geregye administration in Transylvania. Until 1275, Matthew Csák and Nicholas Geregye, rivals to each other, became voivodes several times in acorrdance with their baronial groups' rapid rises and falls in those turbulent years. Ladislaus IV confirmed the donation of Kolozsvár to the Diocese of Transylvania in 1275. Romanian historian Tudor Sălăgean considers this donation was never made and It was merely invented in 1275, by Peter Monoszló and the Csák baronial group as argument to justify the seizure of Kolozsvár by the prelate and their supporters in the name of the minor king. Both Egidius and Gregory lost all political influence for uncertain reasons after 1275, as they had never hold any dignities after that, despite the fact that their allies, the Csák group was able to return to govern the realm even at the end of the year. Peter remained the only member of his kindred who was influential over political matters following that year. By 1276, the St. Michael's Cathedral was rebuilt on the old foundation, which was formerly destroyed during the Mongol invasion of Hungary in 1241. Peter also ordered the construction of Szentmihálykő Castle (today in ruins near Meteș, Romania) in the same year. The Transyvanian Chapter asked permission at the same time through their envoys, provost Clement and dean Bartholomew from Ladislaus to receive privilege of tax exemption at the transportation of excavated product from the salt mine in Torda (today Turda, Romania). During that time (1276), Transylvania was administered by Matthew Csák. The relationship between the voivode and the bishop was cordial and cooperative; the former frequently issued his charters in the episcopal town of Gyulafehérvár, which thus became practically the center of the province. This political stability of power allowed Peter to devote his attention to the extension of the possessions of his diocese.

=== Saxon rebellion ===
In 1277, Peter Monoszló had to face with a widespread revolt among the Saxons which caused severe destruction in Transylvania. According to historian Jenő Szűcs, Peter intended to extend the bishopric's influence over the provostry of Szeben (today Sibiu, Romania), but encountered sharp resistance from the Saxons. The bishop responded with violence, and a certain Alard, gräf (geréb) of the Saxon community in Vízakna (today Ocna Sibiului, Romania) was executed along with three canons. Alard's son, John took revenge and led a revolt against the diocese. The rebellion spread quickly, the infuriated Saxons stormed into the newly built St. Michael's Cathedral, see of the diocese on 21 February, looted the treasury, desecrated the shrines and massacred there about 2,000 asylum seekers, including canons, archdeacons and other priests. The Saxons also scorched and burned churches in the surrounding countryside.

Peter's immediate superior, Stephen Báncsa, the Archbishop of Kalocsa considered the revolt as "ethnically motivated" which was strengthened by the Saxons' "wistfulness for robbery". However earlier charters confirmed Peter's ethnic ignorance: he had approved the Saxon Dominicans' indulgences in Segesvár (today Sighișoara, Romania) and also employed Saxon carpenters at the construction of the St. Michael's Cathedral. The convened assembly at Rákos in May 1277 declared Ladislaus to be of age. The Estates authorized the fifteen-year-old monarch to restore internal peace with all possible means. On 30 May, Báncsa summoned an ecclesiastic congregatio in Buda, where Peter and other six bishops participated, and excommunicated John and his Saxon followers. The prelates also ordered them to pay reparations for their "devilish fury rampage". Despite the sentence, Peter had to rebuild the cathedral from his own budget ten years later, when he commissioned stonemason John, son of Tyno, to erect and restore the cathedral's damaged walls and tower. Ladislaus' faithful prelate, Archbishop-elect Nicholas Kán launched a royal punitive expedition against the Saxons in Szeben region in 1278, in the same time with the defeat of the Geregye dominion. As compensation, Peter was granted destroyed royal lands in Gyulafehérvár for the purpose of colonization. The bishop started to construct episcopal castles throughout the diocese. For instance, Leányvár in Szászfenes (today Florești, Romania) was built between 1282 and 1300 to invigilate the local Saxon communities and the rival Kolozsmonostor Abbey, in addition to protect the possessions of the cathedral chapter. He acquired the village (then simply Fenes) itself sometime between 1291 and 1299, which then split into Saxon and Vlach-inhabited parts after the latter's settlement by Peter Monoszló (present-day Florești and Vlaha in Romania, respectively).

=== Feudal anarchy ===
The papal legate Philip, Bishop of Fermo arrived to Hungary in early 1279 to help Ladislaus to consolidate his authority, but the prelate was shocked at the presence of thousands of pagan Cumans in the realm. Since then Peter Monoszló, along with the other bishops, resided in Buda until October 1280. He participated in that synod which was committed to the defense of the Catholic faith and prescribed that the Cumans should leave their tents and live "in houses attached to the ground". Following that Ladislaus forced prelates to leave Buda for Pressburg, where Philip excommunicated him and placed Hungary under interdict in October. After that Peter resided in Esztergom at the archiepiscopal court of his mentor, Lodomer. Upon Peter's request in 1282, Ladislaus IV confirmed all donations and privileges made by his late father and grandfather in favor of the Diocese of Transylvania, exempting its possessions from the jurisdiction of the voivode and the ispáns of affected counties.

In 1281, local noble comes Stephen accused Peter's two familiares, Michael Chotow and Fuldur forcibly deported thirty-serf families and seized a huge part in the land of Gyovd, near Tasnád (today Tășnad, Romania) for the diocese. A trial was convened at Buda in September 1281, where Stephen was forced to resign from third part of the possession after an interrupted duel. In the same year, Peter filed a lawsuit against three members of the Dara branch of the Csák kindred, Michael, Ugrin and Barc, also owners of Selénd (today Șilindia, Romania), accusing them with arbitrary takeover of the diocese's land, Barátpüspöki in Bihar County. Through the mediation of vice-judge royal Stephen, the two litigants agreed with each other by releasing a smaller area to the Csák brothers. According to a charter from 1282, Peter's army destroyed quickly-built castles inhabited by highwaymen and robbers along the Szamos (Someș). On 23 June 1283, Peter signed a contract with the deacon of the Saxon ecclesial community in Medgyes (today Mediaș, Romania) to transmit the diocese's share of the collection of church taxes in the area for annual forty silver denari.

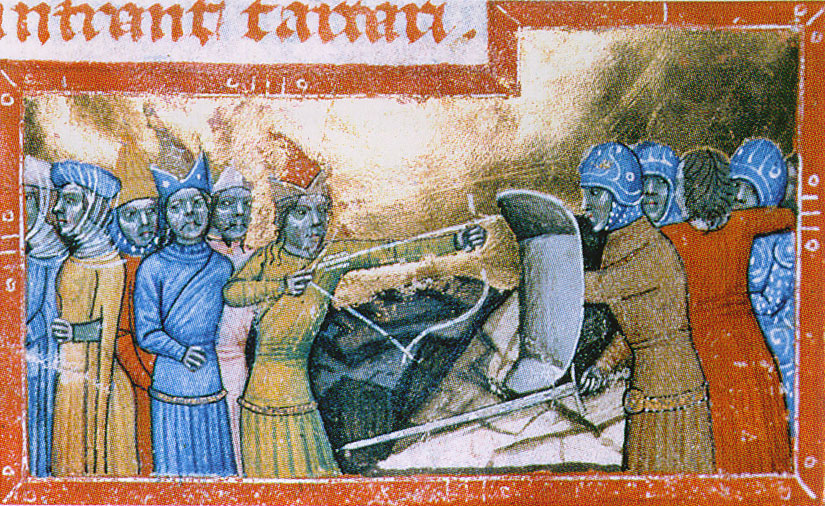
Mongols in Hungary in 1285, depicted in the Illuminated Chronicle

The Mongols of the Golden Horde invaded Hungary under the command of Khans Talabuga and Nogai in January 1285. Talabuga's main army was defeated by the Hungarian troops, while Nogai stayed in Transylvania until the spring of 1286. Meanwhile, Ladislaus also subjugated a rebellion in the Szepesség in September 1285. In Transylvania, Nogai plundered some towns and villages, such as Szászrégen, Brassó and Beszterce (today Reghin, Brașov and Bistrița in Romania, respectively). He also managed to destroy a few forts and walled towns. However, like Talabuga, he failed to take any major fortifications. His army was defeated by Roland Borsa, who served as Voivode of Transylvania since 1284. He was the first baron, who tried to establish a de facto independent dominion in the province, taking advantage of Ladislaus' unpopularity and shocking measures. Through Egidius' unidentified daughter who married Roland's nephew, Stephen, he was akin to Bishop Peter. Despite that family relationship, Peter's relation to the Borsas was ambiguous and fluctuating. Peter, in accordance with the position of the Catholic Church and Archbishop Lodomer, was interested in a strong central power, opposing such local authority efforts. For instance, Peter sued back the right to collect tithe in Ugocsa County from James Borsa, brother of Roland in 1288.

Lodomer summoned the prelates, the barons, and the noblemen to an assembly in Buda and excommunicated Ladislaus in September 1287, following the release of Queen Elizabeth of Sicily, who was imprisoned by her husband, King Ladislaus IV. Lodomer here also entrusted Peter to recover the arbitrarily confiscated queenly estates surrounding Beszterce from the town's magistrate. Ladislaus's favoritism towards the Cumans made him so unpopular that many of his subjects accused him of inciting the Mongols to invade Hungary years earlier. Peter shared this viewpoint, as a result, according to a false diploma, he captured and imprisoned Árbóc (a Cuman maternal relative of Ladislaus IV) and Voivode Mojs Ákos on the instruction of Lodomer and the archiepiscopal synod in 1288, mistakenly thought that they had planned to go the Mongols as the envoys of Ladislaus, searching for help against the Hungarian prelates and barons to strengthen his power. They were released soon. For this role, Ladislaus IV temporarily confiscated the diocese's lands of Kolozsvár and Gyulafehérvár, in addition to surrounding areas and associated privileges, but in September 1289, the king has returned them to Peter, when personally visited the episcopal see.

In the same year, Peter appointed his maternal relative, Michael Bő as grand provost of Transylvania, serving in this capacity until 1296. According to a legal document from 1288, local nobles John and Kemény, sons of Mikola had caused 160 silver denari damage to episcopal estates during an unspecific event earlier. As a result, the Transylvanian generalis congregatio, citing Roland Borsa's earlier judgment, inducted Peter as owner of his enemies' estates of Gyerővásárhely, Sztána and Szamártelke in Kolozs County (today Dumbrava and Stana in Romania, respectively, while Szamártelke did not exist since the New Age) until the fulfillment of compensation. It is possible the expenses of future constructions were mostly covered by this award of damages. An influential baron, Mikod Kökényesradnót donated Koppánd and Ivánkatelke (today Copăceni and Căptălan in Romania) to the Diocese of Transylvania, fulfilling the last testaments of his late brother, Emeric, who otherwise, was the father-in-law of Peter's brother, Egidius and made that donation for triggering his former pledge to participate in a crusade. Peter Monoszló also acquired several landholdings in Kalotaszeg region (Țara Călatei). Peter populated the villages across the Gyalu (Gilău) Mountains with Vlach (Romanian) serfs since the 1290s. The bishop intended to put the seat of his episcopal lordship in Gyalu (present-day Gilău), as Kolozsvár was granted the status of a city only in 1316. Peter also built a palace in Gyalu. During the episcopate of Peter, at least six churches were built throughout in Kolozs County, including in Kolozsvár and Gyalu. In addition to Leányvár in Szászfenes, the bishop also built another castle (Szentmihálykő) near Tótfalud in Fehér County (today Tăuți, Romania).

Over the decades, Peter had several conflicts with Andrew, Bishop of Eger, who served in that capacity from 1275 to 1305. The main source of the conflict was the issue of jurisdiction over the sparsely populated Máramaros region (today Maramureș in Romania). Since the rule of Andrew II of Hungary, it, alongside Ugocsa and Bereg, belonged to the Diocese of Eger, later confirmed by both Béla IV and Stephen V. In the early 13th century, Máramaros was mostly part of Sásvár ispánate. In 1230, the Archdeaconry of Sásvár was already under the ecclesiastical administration of the Diocese of Transylvania. In 1288, Ladislaus IV gave the right to collect tithe to Peter Monoszló, at the same time with the church taxes in Ugocsa County. When Máramaros County emerged in the territory following large-scale resettlement, increasing its significance, Andrew has claimed jurisdiction over the region.

=== Andrew's partisan ===
Ladislaus IV was assassinated by three Cumans, including the above-mentioned Árbóc, on 10 July 1290. Archbishop Lodomer subsequently dispatched two monks to Vienna to inform Andrew the Venetian, a pretender to the Hungarian throne, of the king's death. Along with the other prelates, Peter supported him and swore loyalty to Andrew, who was crowned king on 23 July by Lodomer. He participated in the diet summoned by the new monarch. While visiting Transylvania in March 1291, Andrew III confirmed the privileges of the diocese. Here he also issued the decrees of his 1290 diet at the assembly of the local noblemen, Saxons and Székelys, in February or March. Andrew extended privileges at other estates in the diocese, Peter received higher revenues, thus decided to renovate the roof of the St. Michael's Cathedral, when entrusted Saxon professionals and architects in May 1291.

Peter was a staunch supporter of Andrew III, who, nonetheless, granted the jurisdiction over Máramaros to the Diocese of Eger. After Peter's protest and pressure, he changed his intention, withdrawing the decision, and handed over the matter to the competence of John Hont-Pázmány, the Archbishop of Kalocsa. As Andrew, Bishop of Eger did not present at the archbishopric chancellery and Emeric, Bishop of Várad conducted on-site inspections among the local noblemen, who mostly supported Peter, King Andrew III decided to donate Máramaros to the Diocese of Transylvania. In response, Bishop Andrew has launched a new lawsuit, while Peter initiated an investigation to the Holy See, arguing with the unauthorized nature of the secular courts. Peter also complained about that Bishop Andrew dedicated "unduly" churches and cemeteries in Máramaros even in 1299. The outcome of the lawsuit can not be reconstructed because of the lack of sources, however a few decades later, Máramaros belonged to the Diocese of Eger according to the papal tithe registers.

When Roland Borsa besieged and captured the Diocese of Várad's fortress at Fenes (today Finiș in Romania) on 23 May 1294, Andrew III held a general assembly and outlawed him. The king also laid siege to Borsa's fort at Adorján (now Adrian in Romania). After his victory, Andrew replaced Roland Borsa with Ladislaus Kán as Voivode of Transylvania, but the former preserved all his domains in the lands east of the Tisza. The new voivode became the undisputed leader of Transylvania, and ruled the region de facto independently for the upcoming two decades. Former historiographical works assumed family relationship between Bishop Peter and him, based on a diploma from 1306, where Peter referred to Ladislaus as his "frater". However, in Latin in Medieval Hungary, the phrase also meant "ally" or "friend". Nevertheless, their relationship in the 1290s was cooperative, as both of them supported Andrew against the royal power's enemies. For instance, Bishop Peter's maternal relative, Peter Bő held the dignity of Count of the Székelys from 1294 to 1300, during the first years of Ladislaus Kán. According to Tudor Sălăgean, the bishop's active policy of acquiring property and building castles, as well as the fact that the cathedral chapter and the land of Székelys were also headed by relatives, suggesting that he wanted to bring Transylvania under the control of his family.

Archbishop Lodomer died in January 1298. His successor, Gregory Bicskei, the Archbishop-elect and Apostolic Administrator of Esztergom supported the Capetian House of Anjou's claims to the Hungarian throne against Andrew. The king held an assembly of the prelates, noblemen, Saxons, Székelys, and Cumans in Pest in the summer of 1298, where Peter also participated as the third ranking member among the prelates due to his old age and date of assumption of office. Peter remained in the capital until the next year. Gregory Bicskei forbade the prelates to participate at a new diet which was held in 1299. Archbishop John Hont-Pázmány and the bishops, including Peter Monoszló, ignored his order. According to a non-authentic document, Bishop Peter unsuccessfully tried to reconcile Andrew III and Bicskei. Another false charter claims Bicskei excommunicated Peter and the other bishops, because they remained supporters of Andrew.

=== Interregnum ===
Andrew III died on 14 January 1301, with his death, the House of Árpád became extinct. In the evolving struggle for the throne, historian János Temesváry claimed Peter Monoszló joined the party that offered the crown to Wenceslaus, the son of King Wenceslaus II of Bohemia. He also wrote Peter was present at Wenceslaus' coronation on 27 August 1301, and became Charles' loyal only after Pope Boniface VIII declared Charles the lawful king of Hungary on 31 May 1303. Temesváry justified his argument with data that formerly Peter did not attend that synod in Buda which was convoked by papal legate Niccolo Boccasini in 1302. In contrast, Tudor Sălăgean considers that Peter's relative, Michael Bő, now the Bishop of Zagreb, was one of the first partisans of Charles I beside Archbishop Bicskei. In addition, Peter tried to send 100 silver denari, which would have cover the costs of Boccasini's activity, according to a charter issued in 1302. When Charles I signed an alliance with his cousin Rudolph III of Austria in Pressburg on 24 August 1304, Bishop Peter was among the barons and prelates, who did the same thing in a royal charter. Mihai Kovács argues that Peter sat on the fence and only passively supported Charles. Historian Sándor Hunyadi emphasizes that broad kinship communities (clans) disintegrated at this time, so it does not follow from Michael Bő's support for Charles that his cousin Peter, who probably remained more neutral during the initial phase of the war of succession, would have done the same. Hunyadi argues Peter began to support Charles's claim shortly before the papal bull of Boniface.

Meanwhile, his relationship with Ladislaus Kán remained fluctuating. On the eve of the extinction of the Árpád dynasty, the voivode's men looted the clergymen in Hunyad and Hátszeg (today Hunedoara and Hațeg, Romania). In response, Peter Monoszló and the chapter lodged a complaint to Pope Boniface VIII. With the consent of the voivode, Lawrence Csete, the ispán of Hátszeg lordship prevented the collection of tithes due to the church of Transylvania. After the death of Andrew III, Peter was interested in a strong central power, supported and influenced by the Catholic Church, while Ladislaus Kán endeavored to strengthen his authority, sometimes by using or abusing his office of Voivode of Transylvania. Otherwise in 1306, when the voivode was reluctant to recognize the rule of Charles, whose claim had been supported by the Catholic Church, Pope Clement V ordered Vincent, Archbishop of Kalocsa to excommunicate him and to place Transylvania under ecclesiastic interdict. Peter Monoszló disagreed with that step and expressed his displeasure. As a result, Vincent held out the prospect of the same ecclesiastic disciplinary actions against Peter in case he would not excommunicate Ladislaus Kán who had seized the properties of the prelate of Kalocsa. Some weeks later Vincent withdrew the punishment at the request of Charles and Ugrin Csák, if Peter fulfills the Pope's order. Peter Monoszló successfully preserved autonomy for himself in the province: he was able to perform judicial functions without Ladislaus Kán's "guardianship", i.e. acted on church incomes, last wills and inheritance cases, and in matters relating to dowry, wages, wedding gifts, and daughters' quarters. Sălăgean argues, however, the elderly Peter lost effective control over the diocese by 1306, and Kán's loyal clergyman, John Bogátradvány, Archdeacon of Küküllő, who led Peter's chancellery from that year, took control in Gyulafehérvár. Hunyadi considers John Bogátradvány cannot be considered a familiaris of Ladislaus Kán, despite he administered the voivode's chancellery at least from 1303 to 1306, as he later appeared in the chancellery of the royal court.

The Steirische Reimchronik narrates that the supporters of the newcomer King Otto of Hungary, rival of Charles I, sent a Hungarian bishop, plausibly Peter Monoszló to the Transylvanian Saxons in the autumn of 1305, to agree on their name with them, and they should send envoys to Buda as soon as possible and assure Otto of their loyalty, who would certainly visit them after the coronation. According to the Saxons, who litigated the Transylvanian Chapter in 1309, Bishop Peter participated in that conspiracy, when Ladislaus Kán captured King Otto, during his visit in Transylvania in 1307, and had him imprisoned in one of his castles. The Steirische Reimchronik narrates that Otto arrived to Transylvania to negotiate with the oligarch. The Saxons warned Otto not to trust the voivode. Upon Peter's advice, Otto decided to stay at the bishop's estate and not go to the voivode's castle. However, Bishop Peter's men accompanied Otto to Ladislaus' castle, where he was taken prisoner.

Peter Monoszló died on 27 November 1307, ending his almost 38-year term as Bishop of Transylvania. After his death, Voivode Ladislaus Kán intended to elect his own son, Ladislaus V as Peter's successor, thus captured the canons who had assembled to elect the new bishop. However, due to objection by the chapter, in July 1308, declared that he would not maintain his son's claim to the bishopric. He suggested two new candidates to the canons. By July 1309, the threatened canons were yielding to extortion and elected Benedict, a former councillor of Peter, as the new Bishop of Transylvania. Peter Monoszló was the first bishop who was buried in the St. Michael's Cathedral. An 18th century source preserved the next epithet which was written on his tomb:

"NOSCER ICVS. PETRVS. . CVMVLATVS.
OAVDEAT. IN. COELIS.
DONO. SANCTI. MICHAELIS.
ANNO. D0[M1NI]. MCCC. SEPTI[M]0.
IN. VIGIL[I]A. B[EA]TI. ANDREAE. APOSTOLI"

—

== Sources ==
- Báling, Péter (2024). "Monoszló nb. Péter és Bajor Ottó alakja Stájer Ottokár Rímes krónikájában [The Figure of Peter from Genus Monoszló and Otto of Bavaria in the Rhymed Chronicle of Ottokar of Styria]". In Egyed, Emese; Pakó, László (eds.). CERTAMEN XI. Előadások a Magyar Tudomány Napján az Erdélyi Múzeum–Egyesület I. Szakosztályában (in Hungarian). Erdélyi Múzeum Egyesület. pp. 201–212. ISSN 2393-4328.
- Engel, Pál (1996). Magyarország világi archontológiája, 1301–1457, I [Secular Archontology of Hungary, 1301–1457, Volume I] (in Hungarian). História, MTA Történettudományi Intézete. ISBN 963-8312-44-0.
- Hunyadi, Sándor (2021). "Az erdélyi püspökség és székeskáptalan Kán László vajdasága alatt [The Chapter and the Diocese of Transylvania in the reign of Ladislaus Kán, Voivode of Transylvania]". Belvedere Meridionale (in Hungarian). 33 (1): 19–46. ISSN 1419-0222.
- Jakó, Zsigmond (2001). "Az erdélyi püspökség középkori birtokairól [The Medieval Estates of the Diocese of Transylvania]". In Dávid, Gyula (ed.). Erdély a keresztény magyar királyságban (in Hungarian). Erdélyi Múzeum-Egyesület. pp. 105–115. ISBN 973-8231-05-1.
- Kovács, Mihai (2015). ""Semper meliora prospiciuntur et utiliora attenduntur". Monoszló nb. Péter erdélyi püspök társadalmi és politikai kapcsolatai ["Semper meliora prospiciuntur et utiliora attenduntur" Political and Social Relationships of Peter Monoszló Bishop of Transylvania]" (PDF). Erdélyi Múzeum (in Hungarian). 77 (1): 1–13. ISSN 1453-0961.
- Kovács, Mihai (2019). ""Ut Dei ecclesia in suo statu tuta permaneat et in suis bonis sit tranquilla." Monoszló nb. Péter erdélyi püspök egyházkormányzati és birtokszervezői tevékenysége ["Ut Dei ecclesia in suo statu tuta permaneat et in suis bonis sit tranquilla." The Church Administrative and Estate Organizational Activity of Peter from the Kindred Monoszló, Bishop of Transylvania]". In Fedeles, Tamás; Hunyadi, Zsolt (eds.). Szent Márton és Benedek nyomában. Tanulmányok Koszta László tiszteletére (in Hungarian). FIKP "Magyarország a középkori Európában" kutatócsoport. pp. 294–309. ISBN 978-963-306-709-3.
- Sălăgean, Tudor (2016). Transylvania in the Second Half of the Thirteenth Century: The Rise of the Congregational System. East Central and Eastern Europe in the Middle Ages 450–1450. Vol. 37. Leiden and Boston: Brill. ISBN 978-90-04-24362-0.
- Szűcs, Jenő (1993). Az utolsó Árpádok [The Last Árpáds] (in Hungarian). História, MTA Történettudományi Intézete. ISBN 963-8311-96-7.
- Temesváry, János (1922). Erdély középkori püspökei [Medieval Bishops of Transylvania] (in Hungarian). Minerva Irodalmi és Nyomdai Műintézet.
- Zsoldos, Attila (2011). Magyarország világi archontológiája, 1000–1301 [Secular Archontology of Hungary, 1000–1301] (in Hungarian). História, MTA Történettudományi Intézete. ISBN 978-963-9627-38-3.

Peter II Genus Monoszló Born: 1240s Died: 27 November 1307
Political offices
Preceded by Lodomer	Vice-chancellor of the Junior King; 1266–1270	Succeeded by Office abolished
Catholic Church titles
Preceded by Gallus	Bishop of Transylvania; 1270–1307	Succeeded by Benedict
