= John Székely de Szentgyörgy =

Ban of Croatia from 1446 to 1448

John Székely
- Lord of Szentgyörgy

Ban of Croatia, Dalmatia and Slavonia
- Reign: 1446–1448
- Predecessor: Franko Talovac
- Successor: Ulrich II, Count of Celje
- Died: 18 October 1448
- Noble family: House of Székely
- Spouse: N. Hunyadi

John Székely de Szentgyörgy (died 18 October 1448) was a Hungarian baron, who served as ban of Croatia, Dalmatia and Slavonia between June 1446 and January 1448. He was a brother-in-law of regent John Hunyadi. His son Thomas Székely was prior of Vrana.

His name was first mentioned by historical sources in 1429. He was a familiar of John Hunyadi and served as juror for Solt in 1429. He functioned as judge of the Cumans from 1444 to 1446. After that he was appointed ban and besides that he was also gubernator of the Priory of Vrana. He supported his brother-in-law against the Counts of Celje in the civil war, as a result the nobles of Varaždin and Zagreb Counties complained against him in the Diet of 1447. John Székely was killed in the Battle of Kosovo in 1448.

== Sources ==
- (in Hungarian) Engel, Pál (1996). Magyarország világi archontológiája, 1301–1457, I. ("Secular Archontology of Hungary, 1301–1457, Volume I"). História, MTA Történettudományi Intézete. Budapest. ISBN 963-8312-44-0.
- (in Hungarian) Markó, László (2006). A magyar állam főméltóságai Szent Istvántól napjainkig: Életrajzi Lexikon ("Great Officers of State in Hungary from King Saint Stephen to Our Days: A Biographical Encyclopedia"). 2nd edition, Helikon Kiadó. ISBN 963-547-085-1

Political offices
Preceded by Paul Kompolti	Judge of the Cumans; 1444–1446	Succeeded by Emeric Bebek
Preceded by Franko Talovac	Ban of Croatia, Dalmatia and Slavonia; 1446–1448	Succeeded by Ulrich II, Count of Celje
