= Šemša =

Municipality of Slovakia

Šemša Semse
- Municipality
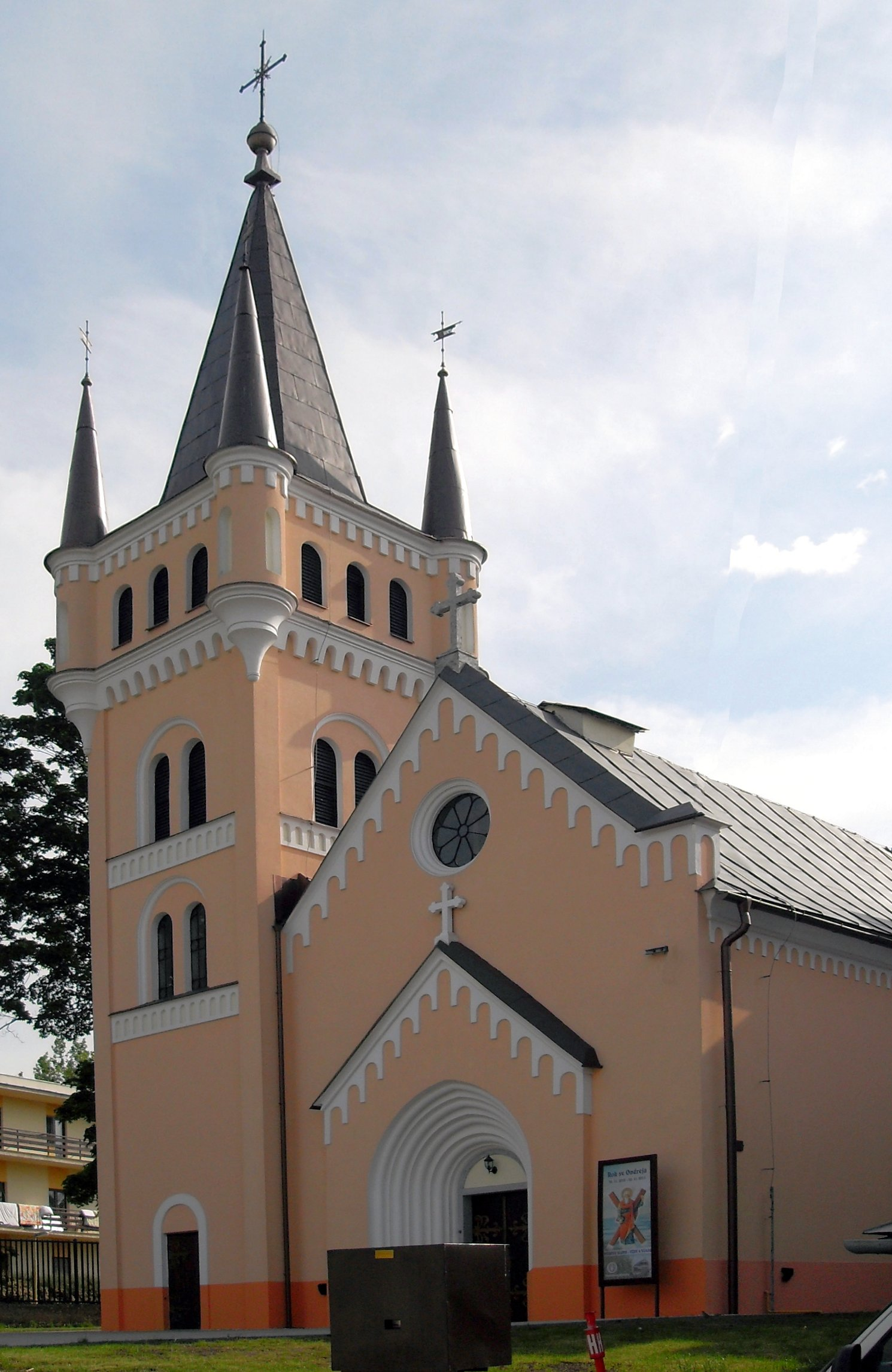

- Flag

- Location of Šemša in the Košice Region Location of Šemša in Slovakia
- Coordinates: 48.68°N 21.12°E
- Country: Slovakia
- Region: Košice Region
- District: Košice-okolie District
- First mentioned: 1280

Area
  - Total: 17.18 km^{2} (6.63 sq mi)
- Elevation: 297 m (974 ft)

Population (2025)
  - Total: 1,033
- Time zone: UTC+1 (CET)
  - Summer (DST): UTC+2 (CEST)
- Postal code: 442 1
- Area code: +421 55
- Vehicle registration plate (until 2022): KS
- Website: www.semsa.sk

Šemša (Hungarian: Semse) is a village and municipality in Košice-okolie District in the Kosice Region of eastern Slovakia.

== History ==
In historical records the village was first mentioned in 1280 when it belonged to Ruszkay lords of Abaúj County in the Kingdom of Hungary. In 1322 it was bought by the castle lord Thomas from Szepes County, who originated the noble family Semsey (“of Šemša”). in 1324 a sector of the village (known as Ižipova Šemša) newly belonged to Ruszkay family. After the Treaty of Trianon, the village belonged to Czechoslovakia. From 1938 to 1945 it was annexed by Hungary.

== Geography ==
The municipality lies at an altitude of 297 metres (974 ft) and covers an area of 17.18 km^{2} (6.63 sq mi) (2025).

== Population ==
Population statistic (10 years)
Year	1995	2005	2015	2025
Count	812	726	801	1033
Difference		−10.59%	+10.33%	+28.96%

Population statistic
Year	2024	2025
Count	1020	1033
Difference		+1.27%

It has a population of 1033 people (31 December 2025).

=== Ethnicity ===
Census 2021 (1+ %)
Ethnicity	Number	Fraction
Slovak	805	95.15%
Not found out	29	3.42%
Hungarian	12	1.41%
Romani	9	1.06%
Rusyn	9	1.06%
Total	846	

In year 2021 was 846 people by ethnicity 805 as Slovak, 29 as Not found out, 12 as Hungarian, 9 as Romani, 9 as Rusyn, 4 as Czech, 4 as Russian, 3 as Other, 2 as Ukrainian, 2 as Polish, 1 as German and 1 as Moravian.

Note on population: The difference values of population numbers in the table "Population statistic" and in the sections "Ethnicity" & "Religion" is caused by the use of various statistical methods.

=== Religion ===
Census 2021 (1+ %)
Religion	Number	Fraction
Roman Catholic Church	526	62.17%
None	210	24.82%
Not found out	32	3.78%
Greek Catholic Church	24	2.84%
Calvinist Church	12	1.42%
Evangelical Church	12	1.42%
Eastern Orthodox Church	10	1.18%
Total	846	

In year 2021 was 846 people by religion 526 from Roman Catholic Church, 210 from None, 32 from Not found out, 24 from Greek Catholic Church, 12 from Calvinist Church, 12 from Evangelical Church, 10 from Eastern Orthodox Church, 5 from Paganism and natural spirituality, 4 from Ad hoc movements, 3 from Other, 3 from Apostolic Church, 2 from Jehovah's Witnesses, 2 from Seventh-day Adventist Church and 1 from Christian Congregations in Slovakia.
