= Judge of the Cumans =

The judge of the Cumans (Hungarian: kunok bírája or kunbíró; Latin: iudex Cumanorum) was a short-lived legal office, then an ex officio title in the Hungarian royal court, existed since the second half of the 13th century. In 1270, the Palatine of Hungary assumed the dignity and became part of its title to merge the two positions for centuries, during which time Cuman settlers were concentrated into Kunság region.

== History ==
=== Origins ===
The position most possibly evolved with the resettlement of the Cuman tribes following the Mongol invasion of Hungary in 1242. In the introductory of the so-called second Cuman law of 1279, King Ladislaus IV ("the Cuman") referred to his grandfather King Béla IV, who placed Cumans under the direct jurisdiction of the Palatine, accordingly. Nora Berend, among others, questioned the authenticity of the document and called an "18th century forgery" which served the purpose of historical legitimacy to the restoration (redemptio) of the autonomous Jassic-Cuman district by Maria Theresa in 1745. In contrast, historians Attila Zsoldos and Tibor Szőcs considered the text is authentic and claimed the Palatine received that authority already during the Cumans' first entry into Hungary in 1239, in analogy to the status of the dignity of Count of the Pechenegs. Szőcs argues Denis Tomaj unusually held ispánates in Eastern Hungary beside his position of Palatine, which laid near to the Cuman tribes' lands, thus he could be the first office-holder who became judge of the Cumans. Contrary to Denis Tomaj, later Palatines after the Battle of Mohi (11 April 1241), for instance Ladislaus Kán, Denis Türje, Roland I Rátót and Henry Kőszegi originated from Transdanubian kindreds, causing the decline and marginalization of the dignity of judge of the Cumans, in addition to the emerging civil war between Béla IV and his son Duke Stephen.

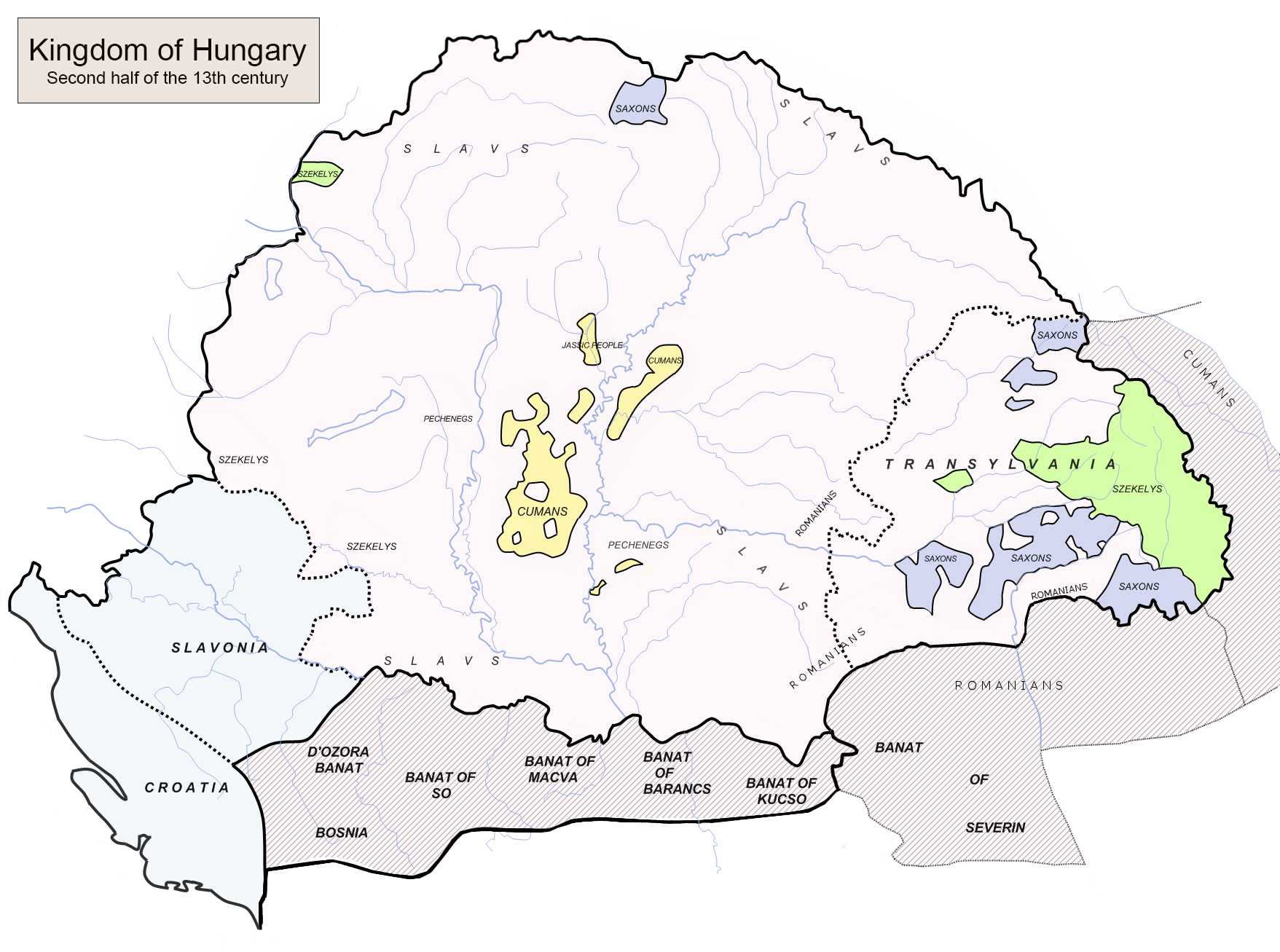
Cuman autonomy (yellow) in late 13th century

Following the war, the Cuman territories became part of Stephen's realm, who adopted the title of junior king and lord of the Cumans (Latin: dominus Cumanorum) in 1262. Duke Stephen also married Elizabeth, daughter of Zeyhan, a Cuman chieftain. The first known person who held the dignity of judge of the Cumans was Gregory Monoszló, who mentioned in this capacity twice in 1269. There is a scholarly debate, whether Gregory II or his namesake son from the Monoszló kindred served as judge during that time. Nevertheless, Gregory III was Elizabeth's brother-in-law through his marriage and was also a member of Stephen's ducal court in the 1260s. Following the death of Béla IV, Stephen V succeeded his father as King of Hungary. With the appointment of Mojs II in August 1270 – also a relative of the King –, the Palatine assumed the title and became ex officio judge of the Cumans to relieve pressure on the king's jurisdictional powers. When the dignity of Palatine was divided to two office-holders sometimes in the 1290s, only the "Transdanubian" Palatine (e.g. Roland II Rátót) bore the title.

Tibor Szőcs notes, the dignity of judge of the Cumans remained only a theoretical role, as the second Cuman law never entered the soil of implementation. For the next decades, there is no diploma or other contemporary source which refers to the palatines' procedures related to Cuman issues. Only Palatine James Borsa mentioned a plundering of Cumans among his grievances during the period of feudal anarchy in 1306, but this remark connected to his own personal complaint (the Borsa estates laid near to the Cumans' lands and the kindred had a long-standing relationship with them) and not his dignity. Before the extinction of the Árpád dynasty (1301), the last Palatine who was also ex officio judge of the Cumans, was Amadeus Aba in August 1300. During the feudal anarchy and subsequent war of succession, when many oligarchs were styled palatines, the position temporarily devalued until the 1320s. Under this, the title of judge of the Cumans detached from the palatinal institution, prominent loyal barons of Charles I, for instance Thomas Szécsényi and Demetrius Nekcsei bore the title, in 1319 and 1328, respectively, but with limited jurisdiction.

=== Functions and development ===
Since 1322, the office of judge of the Cumans was again assumed to the palatinal dignity, and all palatines bore this title, except Leustach Jolsvai (1392–1397) and the early reign of Derek Bebek (1397–1398). However Pál Engel noted other authorities also held the title at the same time beside the Palatine, because they exercised sovereignty over each seats. In this simultaneous system, the Palatine was only a ceremonial and "honorary" judge of the Cumans, and the judges acted independently of the Palatine, according to Tibor Szőcs. The first known Palatine was Nicholas Zsámboki, who took action on the matter of Cumans, in accordance with a diploma from 12 April 1343. The document preserved that the Cuman chieftain Buthemer's kindred came under the jurisdiction of Zsámboki from Thomas Szécsényi, Voivode of Transylvania in order to Louis I's provision. This also confirms that the Palatine's authority was due to an ad hoc royal privilegium, and not a permanently fixed role. In 1371, Louis I granted this privilegium to his Cuman-origin royal fowler, Ladislaus and his Kuncheg kindred too.

Since the 1370s, there are charters which confirmed the existence of the Palatine's judgment in legal matters of Hungarians and Cumans, or in clearly sole Cuman case. Throughout the 15th century, still, the Palatine's supervision over the Cumans was fluctuating. The Statute XI of 1485, a part of the so-called Palatinal Articles of 1485, fixed the Palatine was ex officio judge of the Cumans, who "judges over whole Cumania and is also ispán (count) and judge of the Cumans". For this role, the Palatine received 3,000 gold coins from the Cuman district, confirming the previously established customary law. Since the late 15th century, the title was frequently changed to "Judge of the Cumans and Jassics" (Latin: iudex Cumanorum et Philisteorum).

While the authority over the Pechenegs gradually atrophied due to assimilation process, the title judge of the Cumans went to a different route. After the Battle of Mohács (1526) and subsequent Ottoman–Habsburg Wars, most of the area of Jassic-Cuman district was annexed by the Ottomans, while other parts were administratively attached to nearby border castles, such as Eger, Szolnok and Gyula. Most of the 16th century, the office of Palatine remained vacant, thus the preserved Cuman areas enjoyed greater autonomy under the authorition of the Pressburg, then Szepes Chamber. In 1608, Matthias II restored the Hungarian medieval administrative system based on customary law. The Palatine again became judge of the Cumans, who appointed a captain-general to head of the Cuman district. The Statute XLIII of 1630 guaranteed the judicial powers of the captain-general in the name of the Palatine. Tibor Szőcs notes, the Palatine's theoretical jurisdiction over the Cumans, which laid down in the late 13th century, only materialized in the 17th century, as new element, but not renovation of the tradition.

== List of office-holders ==
=== Before 1270 ===
Term	Incumbent	Monarch	Notes	Source
1269	Gregory Monoszló	Béla IV	member of Junior King Stephen's royal court; there is a scholarly debate, whether Gregory II or his namesake son served in that capacity	

=== After 1270 ===
Since 1270, the Palatine served as ex officio Judge of the Cumans, except some years of interval in early 14th century (first two decades, between 1300 and 1322) and from 1392 to 1398. Other authorities also held the title at the same time beside the Palatine, because they exercised sovereignty over each seats. The following list contains those persons, who also bore similar titles in addition to the incumbent Palatines.

Term	Incumbent	Monarch	Notes	Source
1306–1308	James Borsa	Charles I	only Palatine (1306–1314), who styled himself Judge of the Cumans too among multiple office-holders during the feudal anarchy	
1319	Thomas Szécsényi	Charles I	also ispán of Arad, Bács and Szerém Counties, castellan of Solymos and Hasznos Castles (1318–1321)	
1328	Demetrius Nekcsei	Charles I	Judge of the Olás kindred ("iudex Cumanorum de genere Olaas"); also Master of the treasury (1316–1338), ispán of Trencsén (1321–1328) and Bács Counties (1321–1329); also castellan of Körösszeg Castle (1327–1228)	
1380	Nicholas Pekri	Louis I	Judge of the Queens's Cumans	
1390–1392	Desiderius Serkei	Mary & Sigismund	Judge of the Queens's Cumans	
1393	Frank Szécsényi	Mary & Sigismund	Judge of the Jassics; also royal treasurer (1392–1393)	
1394–1395	Nicholas Kanizsai	Mary & Sigismund	also Master of the treasury (1388–1398); also ispán of Zala, Vas and Sopron Counties (1387–1398)	
1397–1400	Nicholas Csáki	Sigismund	also ispáns of Temes and Krassó Counties (1394–1402)	
1397–1400	Nicholas Marcali	Sigismund	also ispáns of Temes and Krassó Counties (1394–1402)	
1404	John Antimus	Sigismund	Judge of the Royal Cumans; also Vice-Palatine (c. 1404–1419)	
1411	John de Nassis	Sigismund	Judge of the Jassics; also Master of the horse (1409–1412)	
1419	Nicholas Perényi de Rihnó	Sigismund	Judge of the Cumans and Jassics; also Lord Steward (1417–1420)	
1424	Pipo of Ozora	Sigismund	also ispán of Temes, Csanád, Arad, Krassó, Keve Counties (1404–1426); also ispán of the chamber of salt (1400–1426)	
1428	Michael Kátai	Sigismund	Judge of the Royal Cumans, Jassics and Tatars; also ispán of Outer Szolnok County (1428–1429)	
1429–1430	Lawrence Hédervári	Sigismund	Count of the Jassics and Cumans; also Master of the horse (1428–1437) and ispán of Outer Szolnok County (1429–1436)	
1430	Nicholas Gereci	Sigismund	Count and Judge of the Cumans; also a royal knight	
1431	Joseph Kristallóci	Sigismund		
1434	Matko Talovac	Sigismund	also ispán of Keve County (1429–1435)	
1436–1437	John Ország	Sigismund	also castellan of Világos Castle and ispán of Zaránd County (1430–1438)	
1436	Ladislaus Kátai	Sigismund	son of Michael Kátai (1428); also ispán of Outer Szolnok County (1436–1443)	
1437	John Siebenlinden	Sigismund	Count of the Queen's Cumans; also castellan of Óbuda and Solymár Castles (1436–1437)	
1438–1443	Stephen Berzevici	Albert; Ladislaus V	Judge of the Jassics; also Count of the Royal Cumans and Jassics (1442) according to a sole charter; also Master of the doorkeepers for the Queen, ispán of Borsod County, castellan of Diósgyőr, Dédes and Cserép Castles (1438–1439)	
1439	Ladislaus Maglódi	Albert	Judge of the Queen's Cumans; also Count of Kecskemét	
1439	Paul Kompolti	Albert		
1444–1446	John Székely de Szentgyörgy	Ladislaus V		
1446–1448	Emeric Bebek	Ladislaus V	Count of the Jassics; also ispán of Abaúj County (1440–1448) and Voivode of Transylvania (1446–1448)	
1448–1449	Nicholas Újlaki	Ladislaus V	Judge, then Count of the Cumans; also Voivode of Transylvania, Ban of Macsó and commander of Nándorfehérvár (Beograd, Serbia) (1441–1458)	
1454	Dominic Ravaszdi	Ladislaus V		
1456	John Marcali	Ladislaus V	son of Nicholas Marcali (1397–1400); Judge of the Royal Cumans; also ispán of Somogy (1439–1459) and Zala Counties (1453–1456)	
1499–1515	Laszlo Kubinyi	Vladislaus II	Judge of the Cumans and Jassics; also Royal payment master, count of the royal chamber, vice-treasurer (1497-1515), aulae familiáris (1498-1515), castellan and provisor of Buda castle (1499-1515).	

== See also ==
- Kingdom of Hungary (1000–1301)
- Cumans
- Roman Catholic Diocese of Cumania
- Count of the Székelys

== Sources ==
- Berend, Nora (2006). At the Gate of Christendom: Jews, Muslims and "Pagans" in Medieval Hungary, c. 1000-c.1300. Cambridge University Press. ISBN 978-0-521-02720-5.
- Ember, Győző (1946). Az újkori magyar közigazgatás története Mohácstól a török kiűzéséig [The History of the Hungarian Administration in the Modern Era from Mohács to the Expulsion of the Turks] (in Hungarian). Magyar Országos Levéltár.
- Engel, Pál (1996). Magyarország világi archontológiája, 1301–1457, I. [Secular Archontology of Hungary, 1301–1457, Volume I] (in Hungarian). História, MTA Történettudományi Intézete. ISBN 963-8312-44-0.
- Szőcs, Tibor (2014). A nádori intézmény korai története, 1000–1342 [An Early History of the Palatinal Institution: 1000–1342] (in Hungarian). Magyar Tudományos Akadémia Támogatott Kutatások Irodája. ISBN 978-963-508-697-9.
- Tatár, Sarolta (2013). "A rábaközi besenyő ispánság szervezete és fennállása [The Organization and Duration of the Pecheneg Comitatus of Rábaköz]". In Kahler, Frigyes; Bank, Barbara (eds.). Utak és útkereszteződések. Ünnepi tanulmányok M. Kiss Sándor tiszteletére (in Hungarian). Történelmi Ismeretterjesztő Társulat Egyesület. pp. 33–42.
- Zsoldos, Attila (2011). Magyarország világi archontológiája, 1000–1301 [Secular Archontology of Hungary, 1000–1301] (in Hungarian). História, MTA Történettudományi Intézete. ISBN 978-963-9627-38-3.
