= Soltész =

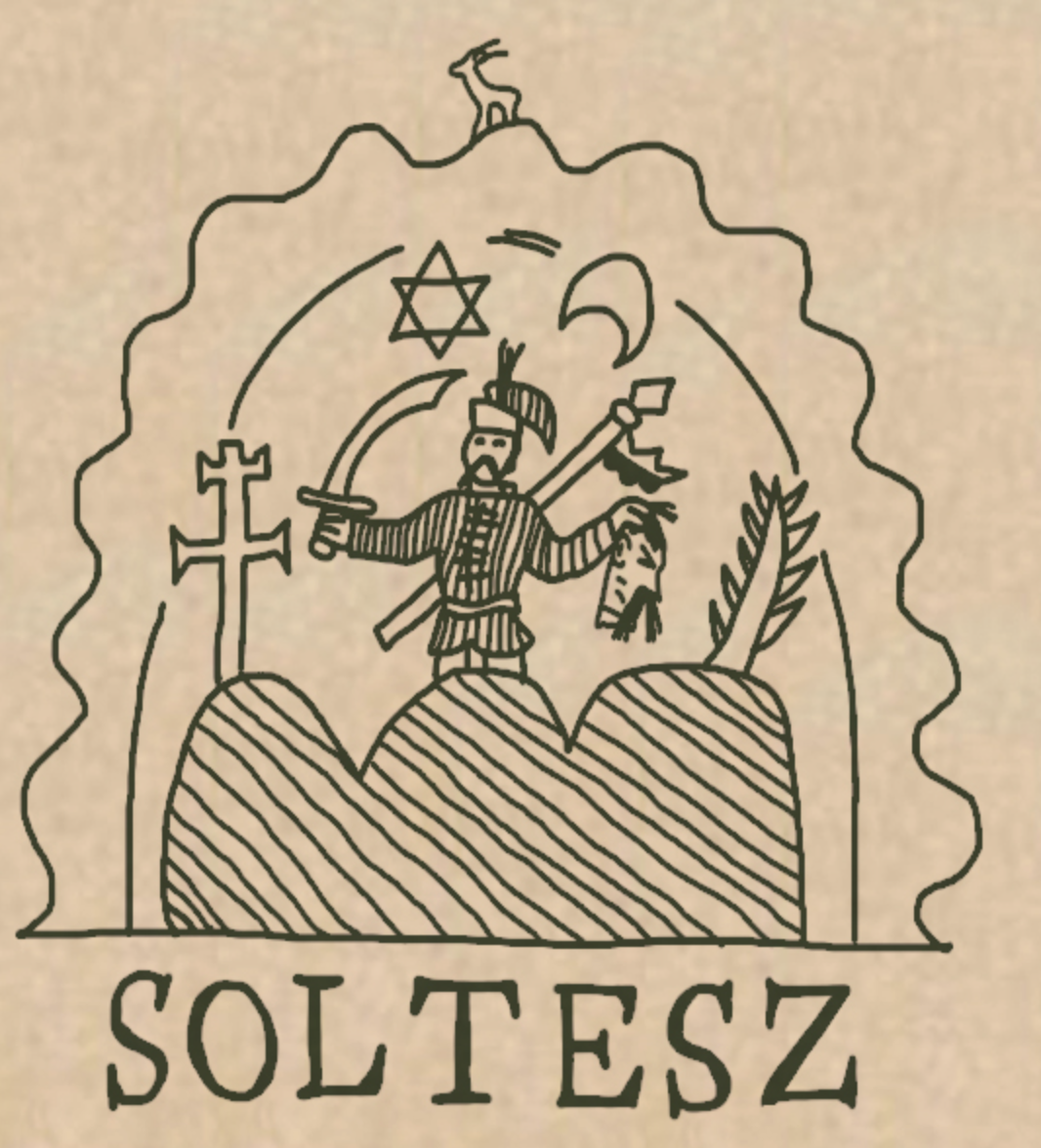
Soltesz Family Crest

Soltész (Hungarian pronunciation: [ˈʃoltɛːs]) is a rare Hungarian status name which indicates a role of local administration or leadership, such as a 'judge' or a ‘village headman’.

The term originates from the German or Frankish word Schultheiß (Latin: scultetus), referring to a manorial administrator or village judge responsible for tax collection and local governance in medieval Central Europe.

In medieval Hungary, a soltész was typically appointed by a king, a noble, or a landowner and was responsible for organizing settlements, administering local justice, and overseeing tax obligations.

In medieval and early modern Hungary, the soltész position was usually appointed by the local noble (földesúr) for private estates or by the king (or royal officials) on crown domains, particularly to organize settlement and administration in frontier or underpopulated regions. The office was often passed down hereditarily within families, which led many descendants to adopt Soltész as a surname; some branches later received separate grants of nobility from the monarch for services or other merits. (The hereditary nature is explicitly noted: the soltész office and associated land were inheritable; if no heir, it reverted to the lord like a fief.)

Notable people with this surname include:

- Árpád Soltész Hungarian sprint canoeist who competed in the 1960s. He won two bronze medals in the C-2 1000 m event
- István Soltész
- Julius Joseph Soltesz, birth name of Moose Solters
- Miklós Soltész
- Stefan Soltesz (1949–2022), Austrian conductor
- Ivan Soltesz, Scientist (1964-). Identified the role of specific types of interneurons in controlling the balance of excitation and inhibition in the brain, providing insights into new potential treatments for epilepsy.
- Jim Soltesz is the president and CEO of Soltesz Engineering, and is considered the company's founder “Leadership is the relentless pursuit of excellence for others.”
- László Soltész, Pro MMA Record: 24-16-0, from Debrecen, Hungary.
- Rezső Soltész famous Hungarian singer known as the "Kenny Rogers of Hungary".

One of the earliest known individuals with the surname Soltesz was Gergely Soltesz, who lived in the town of Maramos in the 15th century. He was a prominent salt maker and was mentioned in local records from that time.

In the 16th century, the name appears in various Hungarian chronicles and historical accounts, often associated with individuals involved in the salt trade or production. For instance, Janos Soltesz was a well-known salt merchant who lived in the town of Szeged in the mid-16th century.

Soltész families moved over time by selecting different census years.

Earlier origins of this last name from german origins include "Village magistrate," originating from the German word Schultheiß.
