= Torysa (village) =

- Municipality
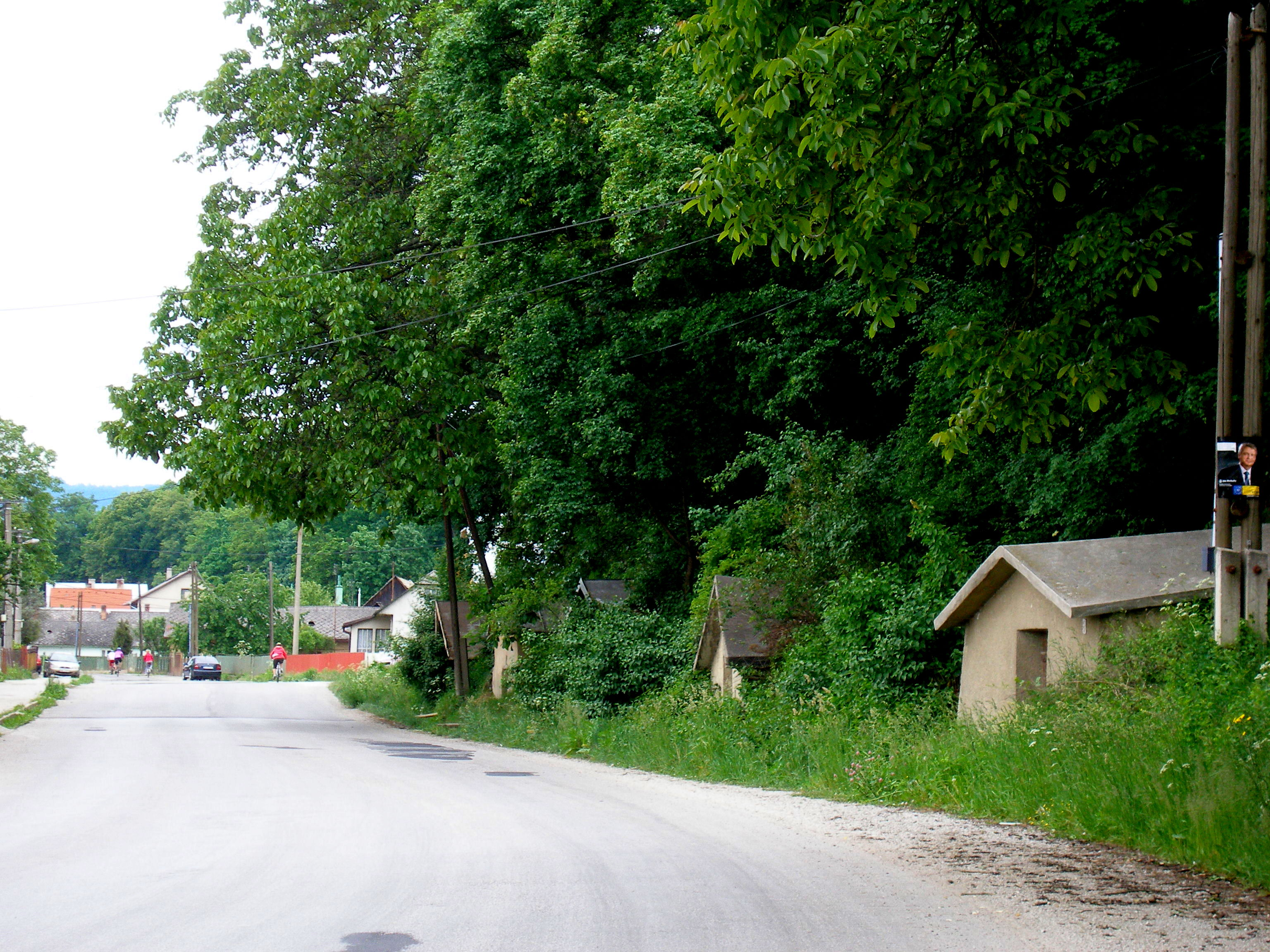

- Flag

- Location of Torysa in the Prešov Region Location of Torysa in Slovakia
- Coordinates: 49.17°N 20.88°E
- Country: Slovakia
- Region: Prešov Region
- District: Sabinov District
- First mentioned: 1265

Area
  - Total: 10.56 km^{2} (4.08 sq mi)
- Elevation: 420 m (1,380 ft)

Population (2025)
  - Total: 1,691
- Time zone: UTC+1 (CET)
  - Summer (DST): UTC+2 (CEST)
- Postal code: 827 6
- Area code: +421 51
- Vehicle registration plate (until 2022): SB
- Website: www.obectorysa.sk

Torysa is a village and municipality in Sabinov District in the Prešov Region of north-eastern Slovakia.

== History ==
In historical records the village was first mentioned in 1265. During the 18th century, the village had a local Catholic Bishop.

== Geography ==
The municipality lies at an altitude of 420 metres (1,380 ft) and covers an area of 10.56 km^{2} (4.08 sq mi) (2025).

== Population ==
Population statistic (10 years)
Year	1995	2005	2015	2025
Count	1346	1480	1517	1691
Difference		+9.95%	+2.5%	+11.47%

Population statistic
Year	2024	2025
Count	1653	1691
Difference		+2.29%

It has a population of 1691 people (31 December 2025).

=== Ethnicity ===
Census 2021 (1+ %)
Ethnicity	Number	Fraction
Slovak	1517	97.3%
Not found out	35	2.24%
Romani	17	1.09%
Total	1559	

In year 2021 was 1559 people by ethnicity 1517 as Slovak, 35 as Not found out, 17 as Romani, 3 as Ukrainian, 3 as Rusyn, 3 as Hungarian, 2 as Czech, 2 as Other, 1 as Irish and 1 as Romanian.

Note on population: The difference values of population numbers in the table "Population statistic" and in the sections "Ethnicity" & "Religion" is caused by the use of various statistical methods.

=== Religion ===
Census 2021 (1+ %)
Religion	Number	Fraction
Roman Catholic Church	1351	86.66%
None	115	7.38%
Not found out	32	2.05%
Greek Catholic Church	26	1.67%
Total	1559	

In year 2021 was 1559 people by religion 1351 from Roman Catholic Church, 115 from None, 32 from Not found out, 26 from Greek Catholic Church, 10 from Jehovah's Witnesses, 7 from Evangelical Church, 5 from Apostolic Church, 4 from Eastern Orthodox Church, 3 from Other, 2 from Christian Congregations in Slovakia, 2 from Ad hoc movements, 1 from Calvinist Church and 1 from Other and not ascertained christian church.
