= Álmosd =

Coordinates: 47°25′N 21°59′E

- Seal Coat of arms
- Interactive map of Álmosd
- Country: Hungary
- County: Hajdú-Bihar

Area
  - Total: 34.13 km^{2} (13.18 sq mi)

Population (2015)
  - Total: 1,653
  - Density: 48.43/km^{2} (125.4/sq mi)
- Time zone: UTC+1 (CET)
  - Summer (DST): UTC+2 (CEST)
- Postal code: 4285
- Area code: 52

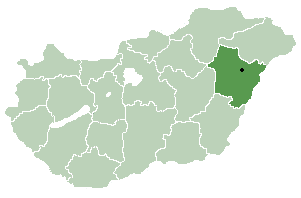
Location of Hajdú-Bihar county in Hungary

Álmosd is a village in Hajdú-Bihar county, in the Northern Great Plain region of eastern Hungary.

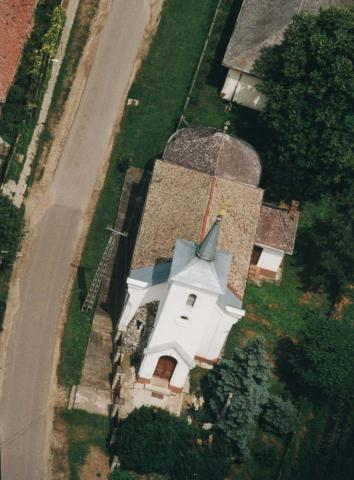
Temple

== History ==
=== The Jewish community ===
Jews began to settle in the village in 1770. In 1830, the Jewish community established a synagogue and a cemetery.

In 1944, 63 Jews lived there, and after the German army entered Hungary, the local Jews were transferred to the Naguivarad ghetto, where all the Jewish residents of the district were concentrated. A few weeks later, they were deported to the Auschwitz extermination camp.

After the war, only a few Jews returned to the village who had survived and community life did not resume. There have been no Jews in the place since 1950.

== Geography ==
It covers an area of 34.13 km^{2} (13 sq mi) and has a population of 1,653 people (2015).
