= Paňovce =

Paňovce Pány
- Municipality
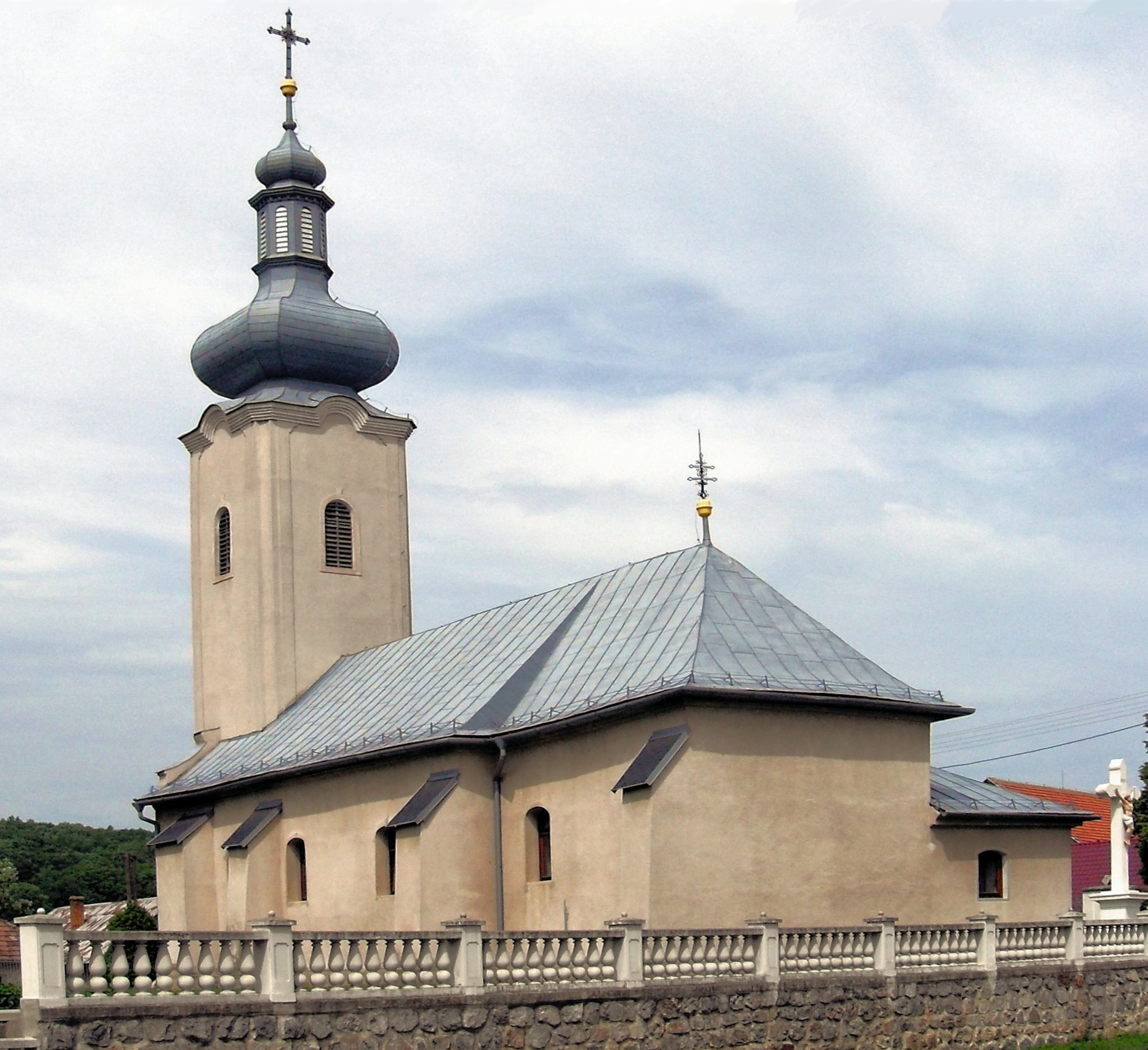

- Flag

- Location of Paňovce in the Košice Region Location of Paňovce in Slovakia
- Coordinates: 48.63°N 21.07°E
- Country: Slovakia
- Region: Košice Region
- District: Košice-okolie District
- First mentioned: 1317

Area
  - Total: 20.67 km^{2} (7.98 sq mi)
- Elevation: 243 m (797 ft)

Population (2025)
  - Total: 623
- Time zone: UTC+1 (CET)
  - Summer (DST): UTC+2 (CEST)
- Postal code: 447 1
- Area code: +421 55
- Vehicle registration plate (until 2022): KS
- Website: www.obecpanovce.sk

Paňovce (Slovak pronunciation: [ˈpaɲɔwtse]; Hungarian: Pány) is a village and municipality in Košice-okolie District in the Kosice Region of eastern Slovakia.

== History ==
Historical records first mention the village in 1317.

== Geography ==
The municipality lies at an altitude of 243 metres (797 ft) and covers an area of 20.67 km^{2} (7.98 sq mi) (2025).

== Population ==
Population statistic (10 years)
Year	1995	2005	2015	2025
Count	574	573	594	623
Difference		−0.17%	+3.66%	+4.88%

Population statistic
Year	2024	2025
Count	622	623
Difference		+0.16%

It has a population of 623 people (31 December 2025).

=== Ethnicity ===
Census 2021 (1+ %)
Ethnicity	Number	Fraction
Slovak	547	92.86%
Hungarian	68	11.54%
Not found out	9	1.52%
Rusyn	6	1.01%
Total	589	

In year 2021 was 589 people by ethnicity 547 as Slovak, 68 as Hungarian, 9 as Not found out, 6 as Rusyn, 4 as Russian, 2 as Czech and 2 as Irish.

Note on population: The difference values of population numbers in the table "Population statistic" and in the sections "Ethnicity" & "Religion" is caused by the use of various statistical methods.

=== Religion ===
Census 2021 (1+ %)
Religion	Number	Fraction
Roman Catholic Church	390	66.21%
None	86	14.6%
Calvinist Church	65	11.04%
Greek Catholic Church	19	3.23%
Evangelical Church	16	2.72%
Not found out	6	1.02%
Total	589	

In year 2021 was 589 people by religion 390 from Roman Catholic Church, 86 from None, 65 from Calvinist Church, 19 from Greek Catholic Church, 16 from Evangelical Church, 6 from Not found out, 3 from Eastern Orthodox Church, 1 from Other and not ascertained christian church, 1 from Jehovah's Witnesses, 1 from Other and 1 from Apostolic Church.

== Culture ==
The village has a small public library and a general store.

== Sports ==
The village has a number of good sport facilities including a swimming pool, football ground and a gymnasium.
