= Sonta =

Sonta Сонта (Serbian) Sonta (Croatian)
- Village (Selo)
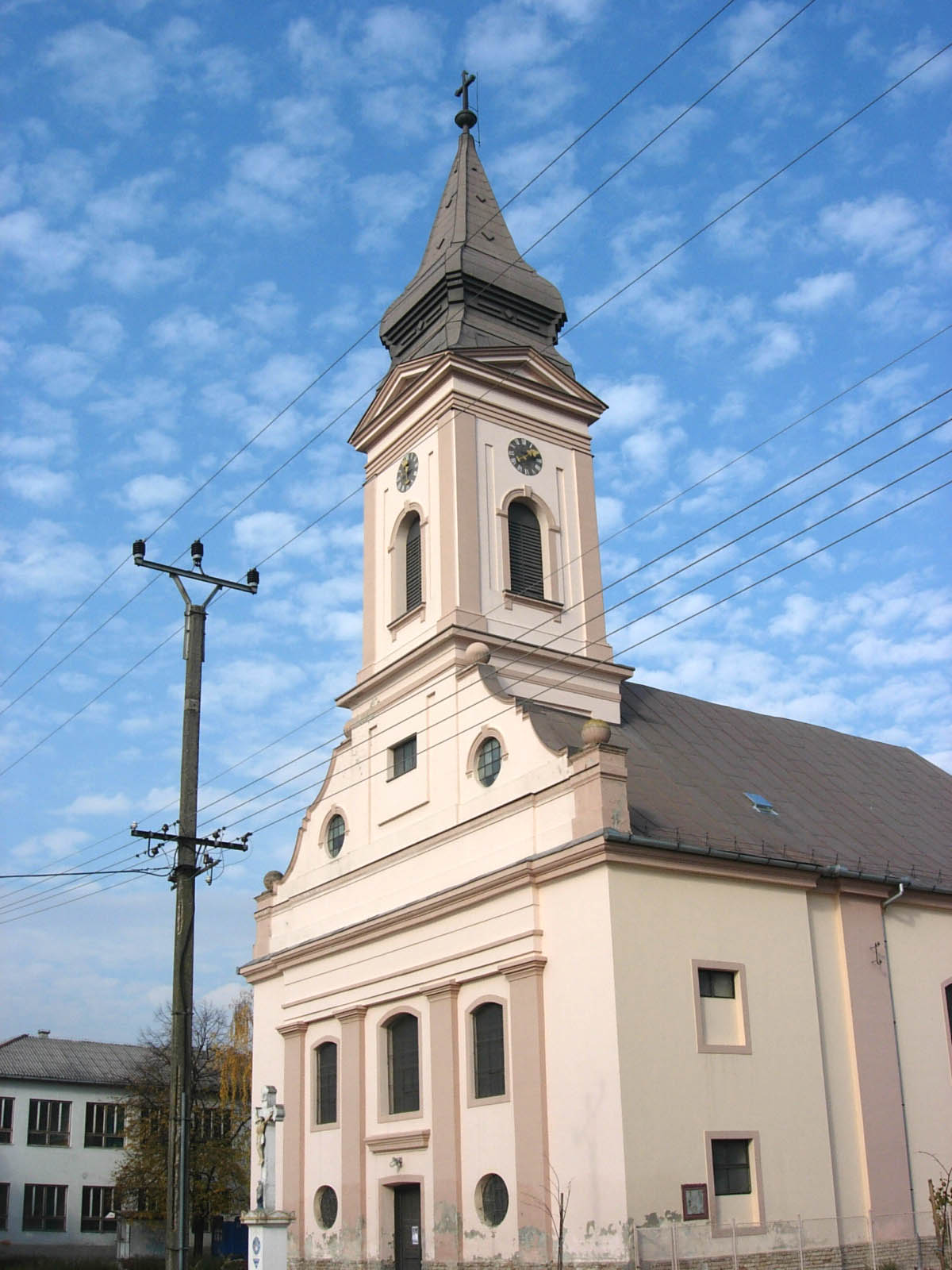
- Saint Lawrence the Martyr Catholic Church

- Location within Vojvodina Location within Serbia Location within Europe
- Coordinates: 45°36′N 19°06′E
- Country: Serbia
- Province: Vojvodina
- Region: Bačka (Podunavlje)
- District: West Bačka
- Municipality: Apatin

Area
  - Total: 125.76 km^{2} (48.56 sq mi)
- Elevation: 86 m (282 ft)

Population (2022)
  - Total: 3,194
  - Density: 25.40/km^{2} (65.78/sq mi)
- Time zone: UTC+1 (CET)
  - Summer (DST): UTC+2 (CEST)

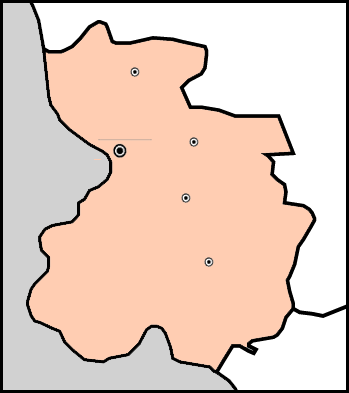

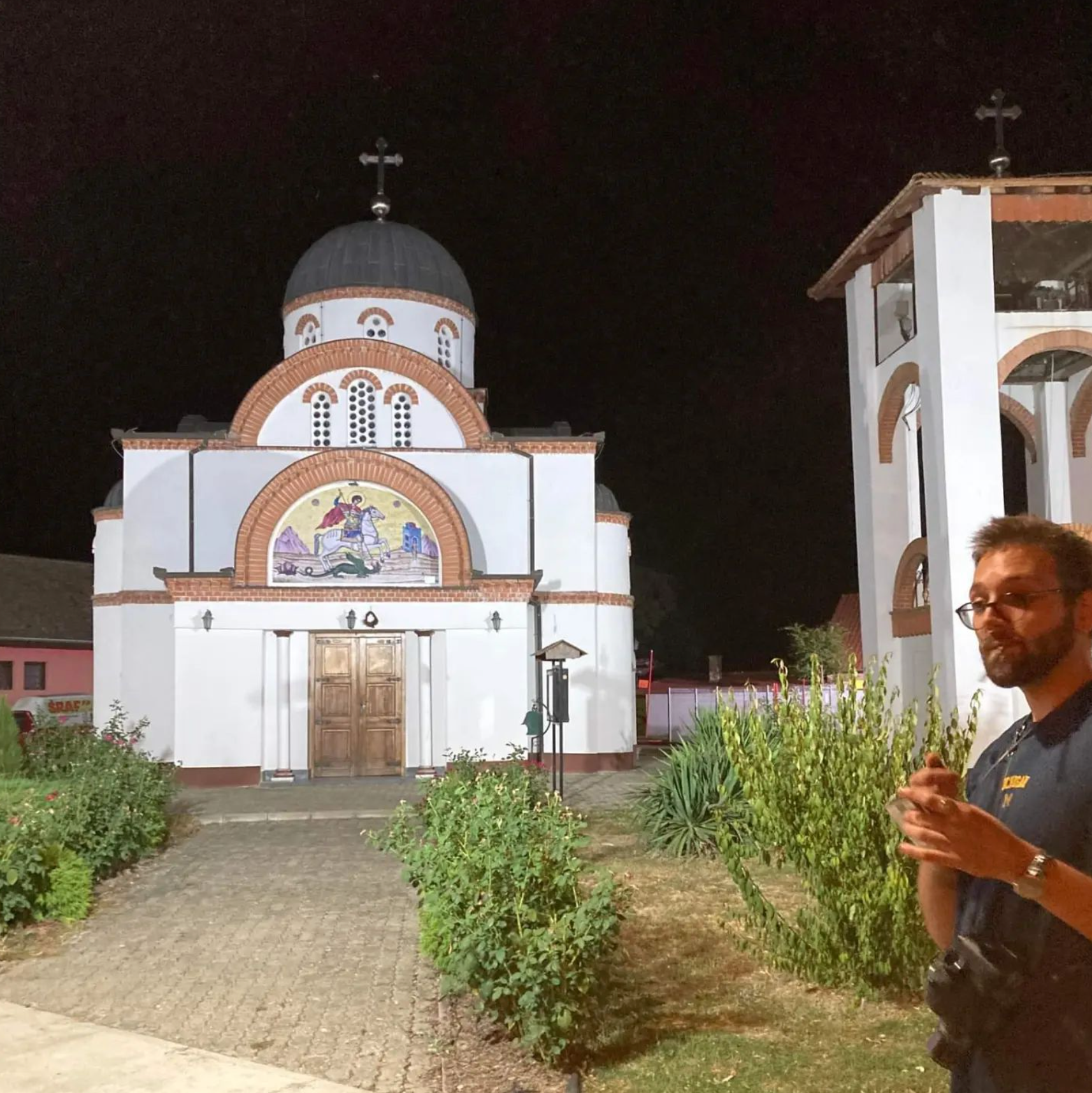
Orthodox church in the village

Sonta (Serbian Cyrillic: Сонта) is a village located in the municipality of Apatin, West Bačka District, Vojvodina, Serbia. The village has a population of 3,194 people (2022 census).

== Name ==
According to some sources, inhabitants of Sonta originating from Herzegovina and they came to this village under the leadership of Sonda Vidaković, thus the name of Sonta derived from the name of this person. In Serbian Cyrillic the village is known as Сонта, in Croatian as Sonta, in Hungarian as Szond, and in German as Waldau.

== History ==
It was first mentioned in the 12th century under name Zund. In Ottoman records, Sonta was mentioned as a settlement with 36 families, while in 1898, its population numbered 4,972 inhabitants and 650 houses. During the 1920s, the village was moved 3 km to the north from its original location because of the large floods of the river Danube.

On the session of the Municipality of Apatin in June 2006, Croatian language gain the status of the official language in Sonta. Until then, Serbian language was the sole official language in this village, although Croats comprised majority in the village since the country of Serbia and Montenegro was established.

== Demographics ==
=== Historical population ===
- 1961: 6,821
- 1971: 6,508
- 1981: 6,313
- 1991: 5,990
- 2002: 4,992
- 2011: 4,238
- 2022: 3,194

=== Ethnic groups ===
According to data from the 2022 census, ethnic groups in the village include:

- 1,508 (47.2%) Croats
- 654 (20.4%) Serbs
- 158 (4.9%) Roma
- 131 (4.1%) Hungarians
- 126 (3.9%) Romanians
- Others/Undeclared/Unknown

== Features ==
Zygaena brizae, very rare in Serbia, has been recorded in Sonta.

== Culture ==
- Grožđe bal, Annual grape festival

== See also ==
- List of places in Serbia
- List of cities, towns and villages in Vojvodina

== Bibliography ==
- Slobodan Ćurčić, Broj stanovnika Vojvodine, Novi Sad, 1996.
- Šašić, Martina; Nahirnić, Ana; Tarmann, Gerhard M. (2016-12-31). "Zygaenidae (Lepidoptera) in the Lepidoptera collections of the Croatian Natural History Museum". Natura Croatica: Periodicum Musei Historiae Naturalis Croatici. 25 (2): 233–248. doi:10.20302/NC.2016.25.19. eISSN 1848-7386.
