= Bő (genus) =

Genus (gens) Bő
- Country: Kingdom of Hungary
- Founded: late 9th century (?)
- Founder: Bő (?)
- Dissolution: 1320s
- Cadet branches: House of Létai; House of Túz; House of Kürtösi; House of Sörnyei

Bő was the name of a gens (Latin for "clan"; nemzetség in Hungarian) in the Kingdom of Hungary, which initially possessed landholdings and villages in Somogy County. Among other families, the Túz de Lak noble family descended from them.

== History ==
Archaeologist Kálmán Magyar argued the Bő clan was one of the ancient ethnic Hungarian kindreds which had participated in the Hungarian conquest of the Carpathian Basin in late 9th century. Along with chieftain Bogát's kinship, they settled in Somogy County south to Somogyvár and centered around Bő (present-day wasteland near Somogyjád). Felsőbő and Alsóbő (lit. "Upper Bő" and "Lower Bő", respectively) are today part of the village Bodrog. Historian György Györffy considered Bő, ancestor of the kindred belonged to the escort of Bogát and occupied the northern watersheds between Lake Balaton and the Drava river. According to Györffy, the name Bő derived from the same ancient Hungarian word means "rich". Members of the clan erected a monastery dedicated to the Holy Cross in Bő, at the turn of the 11th and 12th centuries. By 1329, the provostship of Bő became a place of authentication. The ruins of the monastery was excavated by Kálmán Magyar between 1979 and 1982.

=== Izsép (Túz) branch ===
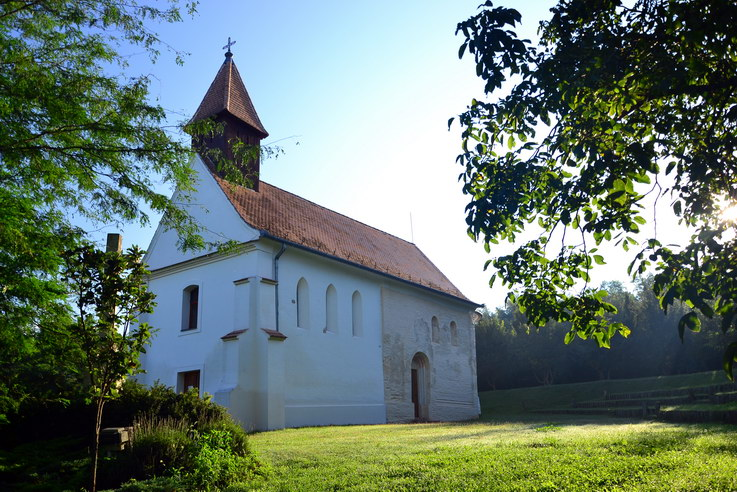
The church of Gyugy

The first known members of the kindred appeared in contemporary records only in the early 13th century. Two branches – Túz (or Izsép) and Ders – elevated by that time. Izsép, son of John, entered the service of Prince Coloman, King Béla IV's brother. Izsép acquired a portion of the village Gyugy in the 1230s. Local traditions say he built the still preserved church there. He was killed in the Battle of Mohi. He had three children: John II (fl. 1241–82), Henry and a daughter. John II, who survived the aforementioned battle, inherited his father's possessions in Somogy County, including Bő with its clan monastery, half of Magyari (today Buzsák) and a portion of Gyugy. John also owned portions in the nearby villages Szentmárton (today part of Mezőcsokonya) and Bodrog. As a daughters' quarter, John handed over both properties to his unidentified sister. John sold the land Terebezd and the right of patronage over the Bő monastery to vice-judge royal Nicholas Tengerdi in 1257. John became one of the leading noblemen of Somogy County by the early 1260s, acted as judge in various local lawsuits. For his loyal service, he was granted the other half of Magyari by Béla IV in 1268. John was a faithful soldier of King Ladislaus IV too, who donated a portion of Kölked to him in 1274. By that time, John also owned the villages Csavonya and Őr.

John II had two sons: Trepk and John III. Although Trepk remained nominally loyal to Ladislaus IV then Andrew III, alongside other local nobles, he was forced to acknowledge the legitimacy of the court of oligarch Henry Kőszegi, who extended his influence over southeastern Transdanubia, including Somogy County by the early 14th century. It is possible that Trepk divided his fortune between his sons Peter I, John IV, Stephen and Nicholas. They were ancestors of the Létai, Túz de Lak, Kürtösi (Messer) and Sörnyei families, respectively. Peter was a page in the royal court of Charles I of Hungary. He possessed landholdings in Szőcsény and Léta (today part of Somogyzsitfa). His brother John IV owned the area of Kölked and Lak. His elder son Peter II ("the Túz") was the progenitor of the Túz family, which flourished in the second half of the 15th century, elevating into the most powerful families for a brief time. Another son Andrew was murdered by a local noble Stephen Kéthelyi in 1348. Trepk's third son Stephen owned Kürtös (today part of Pusztakovácsi). The Kürtösi family split into several sub-branches in the upcoming decades. The fourth son Nicholas possessed Sörnye (today part of Somogysárd). One of his sons Michael served as vice-judge royal during the reign of Louis I. His another son Andrew functioned as provost of Bő, when he was "brutally attacked" by a local noble Andrew Deák ("literatus") in 1377.

Family tree

- John I
  - Izsép (fl. 1226–41†), Master of the cupbearers for Prince Coloman, killed in the Battle of Mohi
    - John II (fl. 1241–82†), killed in the Battle of Lake Hód
      - Trepk (fl. 1274–1309)
        - Peter I (fl. 1313–31), ancestor of the Létai family
        - John IV (fl. 1324–29)
          - Peter II ("Túz"; fl. 1331–49), ancestor of the Túz family
          - Andrew (fl. 1348†)
        - Stephen (fl. 1324–49) ∞ Csalka of Egude, ancestors of the Kürtösi family, and its cadet branches: Szöcsényi, Messer de Kölked and Izsép de Kürtös families
        - Nicholas (fl. 1324–49), ancestor of the Sörnyei family
      - John III (fl. 1302)
    - Henry, owner of Kölked
      - James (fl. 1276)
      - Jakó (fl. 1276)
    - daughter ∞ Aladar of Bay

=== Ders branch ===
The other known branch descended from Stephen, the son of Ders. He served as curialis comes of Somogy County in 1266, a precursor office of the position vice-ispán (de facto administrator of the county). A contemporary of his distant relative John II (see above), Stephen was one of the four noble judges (Hungarian: szolgabíró) in Somogy County since the early 1260s.

Although Stephen originated from a relatively less significant branch of the Bő clan, his sister married Gregory II Monoszló, a prominent landowner in Southern Transdanubia and Slavonia. The marriage resulted the rapid political and social grow of Stephen's two sons Michael and Peter "the Toothed" by the end of the 14th century, as their cousins were the influential barons Egidius, Gregory III and prelate Peter Monoszló. When the latter became Bishop of Transylvania, Michael Bő was made as his grand provost. Subsequently, he served as Bishop of Zagreb, then Archbishop of Esztergom. Peter functioned as Count of the Székelys. In his last will and testament, Egidius donated Darnóc Castle (today Slatinski Drenovac, Croatia) to his cousins in 1298, however both Peter and Michael predeceased him without male descendants.

Family tree

- Ders
  - Stephen (fl. 1266–68), noble judge of Somogy County
    - Michael (fl. 1270–1304†), Bishop of Zagreb, then Archbishop of Esztergom
    - Peter ("the Toothed"; fl. 1294–1299/1300), Count of the Székelys
  - daughter ∞ Gregory Monoszló

=== Other members ===
There were also some members of the clan, whose relationship with the two known branches is unknown. A certain Gregory acted as conciliator in a lawsuit in Somogy County in 1254. Another member Gige – possibly eponymous owner of Gige – bought a portion of Főnyed in 1328. Michael, son of Cosmas owned portions in Bő and Jád. He sold half of these possessions to his brother-in-law, a certain Ladislaus, son of Zoltán in 1328.

== Sources ==
- Karácsonyi, János (1901). A magyar nemzetségek a XIV. század közepéig. I. kötet [The Hungarian genera until the middle of the 14th century, Vol. 1] (in Hungarian). Hungarian Academy of Sciences.
- Kovács, Mihai (2015). ""Semper meliora prospiciuntur et utiliora attenduntur". Monoszló nb. Péter erdélyi püspök társadalmi és politikai kapcsolatai ["Semper meliora prospiciuntur et utiliora attenduntur" Political and Social Relationships of Peter Monoszló Bishop of Transylvania]" (PDF). Erdélyi Múzeum (in Hungarian). 77 (1): 1–13. ISSN 1453-0961.
- Magyar, Kálmán (1984). "Források Somogy honfoglaló nemzetségéről (Adatok a magyar nemzetségi szervezet középkori történetéhez 1.) [Resources about the Conquering Kindred of Somogy County (Data on the Medieval History of the Hungarian Kindred Organization 1.)]". Somogy Megye Múltjából (in Hungarian). 15: 3–40. ISSN 1419-8010.
- Szűcs, Jenő (1984). "Az 1267. évi dekrétum és háttere. Szempontok a köznemesség kialakulásához [The Decree of 1267 and its Background. Aspects for the Formation of the Lower Nobility]". In H. Balázs, Éva; Fügedi, Erik; Maksay, Ferenc (eds.). Mályusz Elemér emlékkönyv. Társadalom- és művelődéstörténeti tanulmányok (in Hungarian). Akadémiai Kiadó. pp. 341–394. ISBN 963-05-3272-7.
- Zsoldos, Attila (2011). Magyarország világi archontológiája, 1000–1301 [Secular Archontology of Hungary, 1000–1301] (in Hungarian). História, MTA Történettudományi Intézete. ISBN 978-963-9627-38-3.
