= John Bő =

John (II) Bő
- Died: September/October 1282; Battle of Lake Hód
- Noble family: gens Bő
- Issue: Trepk; John III
- Father: Izsép

John (II) from the kindred Bő (Hungarian: Bő nembeli (II.) János; died September/October 1282) was a Hungarian nobleman in the 13th century.

== Family ==
John (II) was born into the so-called Túz (or Somogy) branch of the gens (clan) Bő, which originated from Somogy County, and was one of the ancient ethnic Hungarian kindreds which had participated in the Hungarian conquest of the Carpathian Basin in late 9th century. His father was Izsép, a confidant of Duke Coloman, King Béla IV's younger brother. John had a brother Henry and an unidentified sister. John II had two sons – Trepk and John III – from his marriage with an unidentified noblewoman. Through Trepk, he was ancestor of the Túz de Lak family, along with other less significant families.

== Life ==
Both Izsép and John participated in the Battle of Mohi on 11 April 1241, where the Mongol invaders measured heavy defeat on the Hungarian royal army. Both of them fought under the banner of Coloman. While Izsép was killed in the battle, John managed to survive, despite that his left leg was pierced by a spear. John inherited his father's possessions in Somogy County, including Bő – the eponymous estate – with its clan monastery, half of Magyari (today Buzsák) and a portion of Gyugy with accessories, which laid south to Somogyvár. John also owned portions in the nearby villages Szentmárton (today part of Mezőcsokonya) and Bodrog. As a daughters' quarter, John handed over both properties to his unidentified sister. John sold the land Terebezd and the right of patronage over the Bő monastery to vice-judge royal Nicholas Tengerdi in 1257.

John was selected an ad-litem arbiter during a division process of lands in 1254. By the next decade, he became one of the most prominent members of the local elite in Somogy County. He acted as co-judge in various lawsuits in the county, for instance in 1262, 1268–1269 and 1276–1277. Historian Jenő Szűcs argued John was one of the four noble judges (Hungarian: szolgabíró) in Somogy County since the early 1260s, and functioned in this capacity in the aforementioned lawsuits. Following King Béla and his son Duke Stephen together confirmed the liberties of the "royal servants", from then on known as noblemen in their Decree of 1267, the ispán (head) of Somogy County, Lawrence, son of Kemény was commissioned to review the ownership of several possessions in the county, as one of the articles of the Decree of 1267 ordained that "the lands of the nobles, which thou art ours, the peoples of the queen's free villages, or the courtiers, or the castle folks, are occupied or kept occupied under any pretext, must be returned to these nobles". The assembly of Somogy County delegated five local nobles to the ad-litem court chaired by Lawrence, including John Bő at the first place, along with, for instance, his distant relative Stephen Bő. Throughout the year 1268, the six-member commission performed the task. According to historian Jenő Szűcs, the restitution of lands was biased towards them. For his loyal service, John was granted the other half of Magyari (prior to that, it belonged to the castle folks of Somogyvár) by Béla IV in the same year. Szűcs argued, the donation occurred at the request of John, as part of their restitution mandate in Somogy County.

Whether John participated in any military campaigns during Béla's reign following the Mongol invasion, it is uncertain, but presumable according to the wording of the letter of donation. Béla's successor Stephen V confirmed the land donation regarding Magyari, but John – for some reasons – returned it to the castle folks of Somogyvár. Nevertheless, King Ladislaus IV donated whole Magyari with the neighboring swamps, islands and other accessories to John again in 1279. Joining the royalist army, John participated in the Battle of Föveny in late September 1274, where Henry Kőszegi was killed and Ladislaus' brother Andrew was liberated. As a result, he was also granted a portion in Kölked by the monarch in 1274. By that time, John also owned the villages Csavonya and Őr. In 1277, John was appointed to preside that commission which intended to investigate and curb the "robberies and thefts" in Somogy and Zala counties. These commissions set up throughout Hungary after Ladislaus IV was declared to be of age by the national diet. On 6 March 1278, John filed a lawsuit against Atyusz Hahót before the court of ispán Denis Péc and his cousin Gregory Péc in Somogyvár. According to his charges, Atyusz unlawfully seized his village Csavonya and robbed his servants in Őr (both villages laid in southwestern part of Somogy County, far from the Bő clan's ancient centre). The subsequent court at Segesd on 25 March, chaired by Denis' successor Peter Csák ruled in the favor of John based on an evidentiary procedure. John was also present at the Battle on the Marchfeld on 26 August 1278. He faithfully served Ladislaus in the subsequent years too. He was killed in the battle at Lake Hód (near present-day Hódmezővásárhely) against the rebellious Cumans around September–October 1282.

== Sources ==
- Karácsonyi, János (1901). A magyar nemzetségek a XIV. század közepéig. I. kötet [The Hungarian genera until the middle of the 14th century, Vol. 1] (in Hungarian). Hungarian Academy of Sciences.
- Szűcs, Jenő (1984). "Az 1267. évi dekrétum és háttere. Szempontok a köznemesség kialakulásához [The Decree of 1267 and its Background. Aspects for the Formation of the Lower Nobility]". In H. Balázs, Éva; Fügedi, Erik; Maksay, Ferenc (eds.). Mályusz Elemér emlékkönyv. Társadalom- és művelődéstörténeti tanulmányok (in Hungarian). Akadémiai Kiadó. pp. 341–394. ISBN 963-05-3272-7.
