= Izsép Bő =

Hungarian nobleman

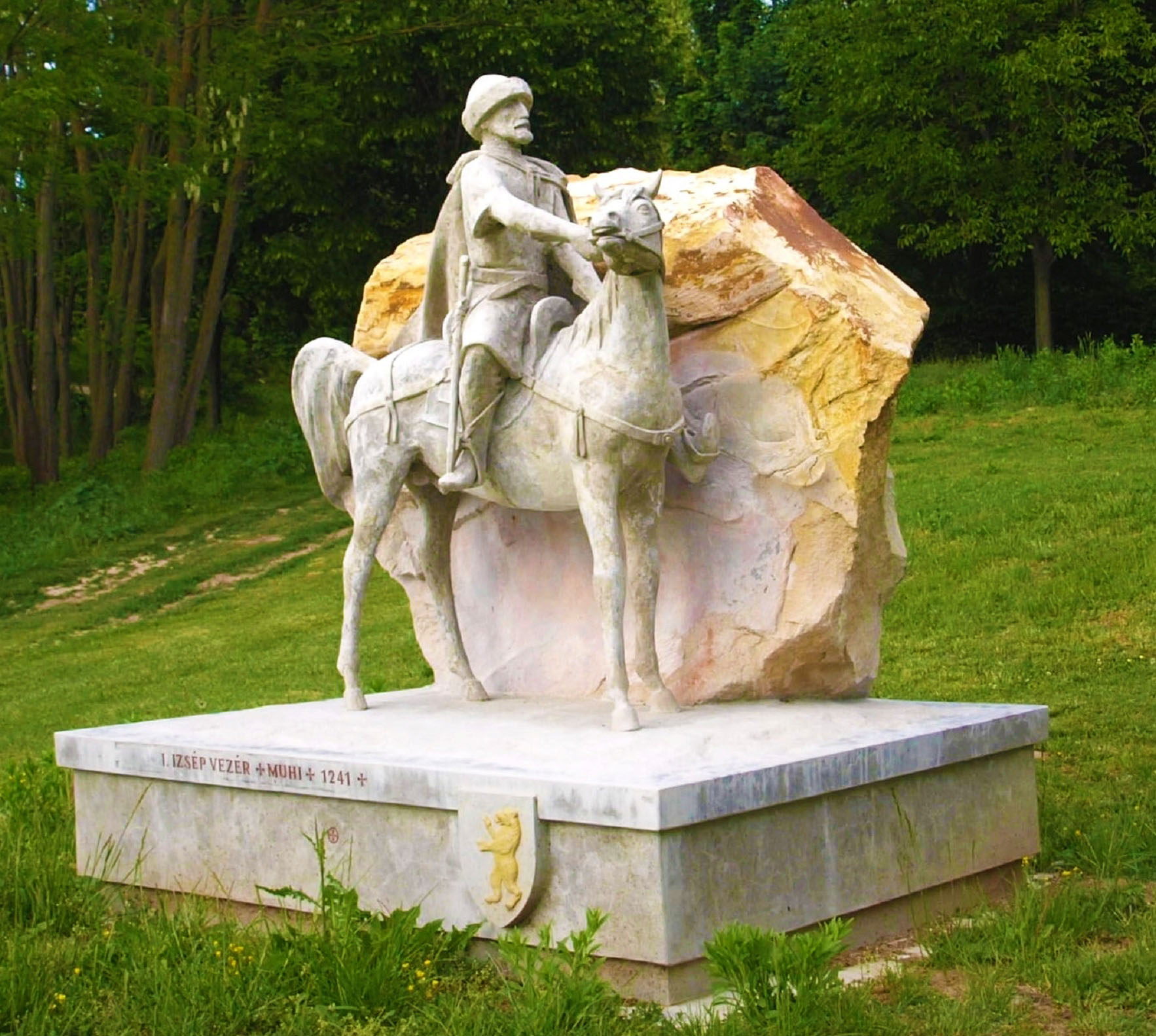
- Equestrian statue of Izsép Bő in Gyugy, conceived by sculptor György Egri

Master of the cupbearers for Prince Coloman
- Reign: ?–1241
- Died: 11 April 1241; Battle of Mohi
- Noble family: gens Bő
- Issue: John II; Henry a daughter
- Father: John I

Izsép from the kindred Bő (Hungarian: Bő nembeli Izsép; died 11 April 1241) was a Hungarian nobleman in the first half of the 13th century. He was the forefather of the Túz de Lak noble family, which flourished in the 15th century.

== Life ==
He was born into the so-called Túz (or Somogy) branch of the gens (clan) Bő, which originated from Somogy County, and was one of the ancient ethnic Hungarian kindreds which had participated in the Hungarian conquest of the Carpathian Basin in late 9th century. His father was John I, the first known member of the clan. Izsép had three children: John II (fl. 1241–82), Henry (who owned Kölked) and a daughter, who married Aladar of Bay. Through his great-great grandson, Peter (fl. 1331–49), the Túz family descended from Izsép, in addition to the less significant Létai, Sörnyei, Szöcsényi and Messer kinships.

Izsép was a confidant of Prince Coloman, the younger brother of Béla IV of Hungary. In 1226, he appeared as a pristaldus (royal commissioner or "bailiff") during a revisory act of royal land donations, when Béla, still as Duke of Transylvania, started reclaiming his father King Andrew II's land grants throughout the country. Sometimes after Coloman was made Duke of Slavonia in that year, Izsép became the Master of the cupbearers in his court. Izsép acquired the village of Gyugy through royal donation sometime between 1236 and 1241.

According to a royal charter from 1268, he still held the dignity, when perished in the Battle of Mohi against the invading Mongols on 11 April 1241. The document narrates, he defended the bridge at Sajó river near the battlefield at the expense of his life in order to allow King Béla and his escort to flee after the disastrous defeat. His son John also wounded in the skirmish, but he managed to survive.

== Memory ==
Izsép is honored as founder and high-impact possessor in Gyugy, Somogy County. Local traditions attributed the construction of the local church, which was built at the turn of the 12th and 13th centuries, according to archaeological excavations, to the person of Izsép. The Bő clan's presumed heraldic animal (bear) was also added to the coat-of-arms of Gyugy. An equestrian statue of Izsép, conceived by sculptor György Egri, was erected next to the church in 2018.

== Sources ==
- Karácsonyi, János (1901). A magyar nemzetségek a XIV. század közepéig. I. kötet [The Hungarian genera until the middle of the 14th century, Vol. 1] (in Hungarian). Hungarian Academy of Sciences.
- Zsoldos, Attila (2011). Magyarország világi archontológiája, 1000–1301 [Secular Archontology of Hungary, 1000–1301] (in Hungarian). História, MTA Történettudományi Intézete. ISBN 978-963-9627-38-3.
