= Međureč =

Međureč may refer to:

- Međureč (Jagodina), a village in the municipality of Jagodina, Serbia
- Međureč, Ulcinj, a village in the municipality of Ulcinj, Montenegro

== See also ==
- Međurečje (disambiguation)
