= Michael Bő =

Hungarian prelate

- Archbishop of Esztergom
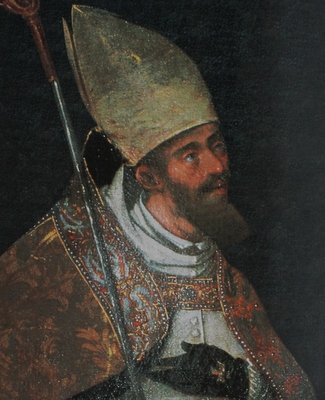
- 16th-century depiction
- See: Esztergom
- Appointed: 1303
- Term ended: 1304
- Predecessor: Gregory Bicskei
- Successor: Thomas II
- Other post: Bishop of Zagreb

Personal details
- Died: August/October 1304 Pressburg, Kingdom of Hungary
- Buried: St. Martin's Cathedral
- Parents: Stephen Bő

Michael from the kindred Bő (Hungarian: Bő nembeli Mihály, Croatian: Mihalj; died August/October 1304), was a Hungarian prelate at the turn of the 13th and 14th centuries, who served as Bishop of Zagreb from 1296 to 1303, then Archbishop of Esztergom from 1303 until his death.

== Early career ==
Michael was born into the Ders branch of the gens (clan) Bő, which originated from Somogy County, and was one of the ancient ethnic Hungarian kindreds which had participated in the Hungarian conquest of the Carpathian Basin in late 9th century. His younger brother was Peter the Toothed. Through their unidentified paternal aunt (a sister of their father Stephen), Michael and Peter were related to the gens Monoszló and its influential contemporary members, brothers Egidius, Gregory and Peter.

As contemporary sources frequently referred to him with the prefix "magister", Michael studied canon law. In 1270, he was a notary in the court of King Stephen V. It is also possible that he served as archdeacon of Ózd since 1277. Perhaps he functioned as royal vice-chancellor in 1279. Due to the influence of his cousin, Peter Monoszló, Bishop of Transylvania, Michael was elected Grand Provost by the Transylvanian Chapter in 1287, holding the position until 1296. Meanwhile, his brother Peter Bő became Count of the Székelys around 1294. In December 1294, Egidius Monoszló donated three villages of the Atyina (today Voćin, Croatia) lordship to the Bő brothers, entrusting the Pécs Chapter to contribute his instruction. The land donation was confirmed by Andrew III on 9 January 1295. Egidius Monoszló made his first will and testament in 1298, when formally adopted his maternal relatives (cousins) Michael and Peter. Egidius donated Darnóc Castle (today Slatinski Drenovac, Croatia) to them, however both Michael and Peter predeceased him.

== Prelate ==
=== Bishop of Zagreb ===
After the death of his predecessor John on 13 October 1295, who presumably supported the Angevins' claim to the Hungarian and Croatian thrones, Michael Bő, a confidant of King Andrew III was elected Bishop of Zagreb. He was elected as the king's candidate to the position, which guaranteed a faithful supporter in Slavonia with its revenues for Andrew. He first appeared in that capacity in 1296. His election was confirmed by Pope Boniface VIII on 20 January 1297. In the same time, Michael became chancellor (mentioned in 1297) in the court of Andrew's uncle Albertino Morosini, Duke of Slavonia, in addition to his titles of ispán of Garics (Garić or Podgaric) and Gerzence (Garešnica) lordships, held both from 1297 until 1303. However, practically, those territories were occupied by the powerful Kőszegi family since the 1280s, neglecting the diocese's legal claims. Albertino Morosini and Michael Bő represented the royal power in the province of Slavonia against the increasingly powerful oligarchs (especially, the Kőszegis) and the pro-Angevin baronial groups. The new Bishop removed and expelled his predecessor's confidants from the town and the chapter. Michael concluded a contract with the Babonići to fought against the Kőszegis, whose troops even plundered and devastated the territory of the Diocese of Zagreb, while looted its treasures. Michael led numerous royal campaigns against the Kőszegis' territory. Its overlord Henry Kőszegi concluded a peace with the Bishop by the end of 1297 and handed over the forts of Gerzence and Garics to the diocese, which suffered from the endless warfare. Under such conditions, Michael financially supported the Chapter of Čazma (Csázma) from his own wealth. After the Diet of 1298, he remained in the royal court and never visited his diocese or the Croatian province again. Michael's seal from 1299 preserved the first art depiction of the Zagreb Cathedral.

According to Michael's charter from January 1299, Henry Kőszegi had attacked and plundered the ecclesiastical estate of Čazma. Two of his predialists also joined the attack, in retaliation Michael Bő confiscated their landholdings from them in his charter. In order to placate the bishop, both nobles granted Michael the right to possess Međurječje. Their cousins, who claimed they ended up in poverty and famine because of the frequent devastation but survived tanks to the bishop's help, also provided the right over the settlement to Michael. According to historian Antun Nekić, Michael strived to establish a personal network of local lesser nobles in Slavonia, mutually defending their interests against the aspirations of local oligarchic domains. In the same year, Michael donated the estate of "Gulynchi" to local noble Ugrin, who proved to be a faithful servant of the bishopric in opposite Grdun (or Gárdony), a "notorious persecutor" of the diocese. Bishop John, Michael's predecessor stated exactly the opposite from the two nobles ten years ago. The relationship between Michael and the Babonići was fluctuating depending on the latter's relationship with King Andrew III. After a group of powerful lords invited Charles of Anjou to the Hungarian throne in early 1300, Andrew III reconciled with his ardent enemies, the oligarchs by the summer of 1300. Therefore, Michael was forced to hand over much of his authority and jurisdiction to the Babonić family and a mutual assistance agreement has been concluded between them. While Henry Kőszegi, under his agreement with Andrew III, was installed as Ban of Slavonia, the Babonići drew the Diocese of Zagreb to their sphere of interest with royal approval in the same time.

Andrew III died on 14 January 1301. Following that Michael became one of the first partisans of Charles of Anjou beside Archbishop-elect Gregory Bicskei, while majority of the prelates supported the claims of the Bohemian prince Wenceslaus. As a skilled notary and canonist, he help the diplomatic work of papal legate Niccolo Boccasini, who tried to persuade the secular barons to support Charles' claim against the other pretenders. In September 1302, Michael was present, when Charles' general Stephen Csák laid siege to Buda, the capital of Wenceslaus' realm, but Ivan Kőszegi relieved the siege. Pope Boniface, who regarded Hungary as a fief of the Holy See declared Charles the lawful king of Hungary on 31 May 1303. Michael was a member of that ecclesiastical delegation, which was present during the act. Thereafter, they visited the Neapolitan court. The papal bull was annunciated in Hungary by Michael Bő and Stephen, the new Archbishop of Kalocsa. It is possible that Charles regarded both as the most determined supporters of his rule within the church hierarchy. They presented and proclaimed the document in Čazma on 30 July, Đakovo on 6 August and Székesfehérvár on 12 August.

=== Archbishop of Esztergom ===
His ally, Archbishop-elect Gregory Bicskei was murdered in Anagni on 7 September 1303 by soldiers whom Philip IV of France had sent to Italy to capture Pope Boniface, who also died in the next month. Michael's former colleague Niccolo Boccasini was elected as Pope Benedict XI. On 4 November 1303, he appointed Michael as Archbishop of Esztergom, while characterizing his friend as "noble, scholar, fine and diligent". In contrast to Gregory Bicskei, Michael enjoyed general respect and acceptance among the Hungarian prelates, which contributed significantly to the support of Charles's rule was significantly strengthened by members of the senior clergy along with monastic church organization, who previously had favored Wenceslaus' rule, after the middle of 1303.

On 21 March 1304, the Pope informed Benedict Rád, Bishop of Veszprém that he had sent the pallium to Michael, after the receipt of his oath of loyalty. On 24 August 1304, Michael styled himself as "Archbishop appointed from the God's grace" (his last appearance as a living person). Only a few information has been preserved during his brief primacy; on 4 February he lifted clergyman Bede from the excommunication at the Pope's instruction, while excommunicated Nicholas, son of Felician, a canon of Esztergom on 15 May, who unlawfully usurped the goods of the Szepes Provostry (today Spišská Kapitula in Slovakia). His case of servitium commune was represented by Theophilus, Grand Provost of Esztergom and Rodinus, Archdeacon of Bars, then Theophilus and Bittinus de Coneglano, Archdeacon of Nógrád in the Roman Curia. In the summer of 1304, the Bohemian army invaded Upper Hungary and encamped at Párkány (present-day Štúrovo in Slovakia). There Wenceslaus II of Bohemia called upon Michael to crown his namesake son as King of Hungary, but the Archbishop refused the threat and also resisted attempts at bribery. Following that the Bohemian troops stormed Esztergom and looted its treasury, in addition to the destruction of diplomas and holy relics. Michael fled his archbishopric seat for Pressburg (today Bratislava, Slovakia). There, Charles and Rudolf of Habsburg signed an alliance against Bohemia, which was also confirmed by Michael along with several other barons and prelates on 24 August 1304. They jointly invaded Bohemia in the autumn. Michael Bő died soon. On 1 November 1304, Theophilus, Grand Provost of Esztergom already referred to him as a deceased person. Michael was buried in the St. Martin's Cathedral.

== Sources ==
- Beke, Margit (2003). "Bő nembeli Mihály [Michael from the kindred Bő]". In Beke, Margit (ed.). Esztergomi érsekek 1001–2003 [Archbishops of Esztergom 1001–2003] (in Hungarian). Szent István Társulat. pp. 142–145. ISBN 963-361-472-4.
- Dobronić, Lelja (1995). "Mihalj [Michael]". In Franko, Mirošević (ed.). Zagrebački biskupi i nadbiskupi [Bishops and Archbishops of Zagreb] (in Croatian). Školska knjiga. pp. 89–93. ISBN 953-0-60597-8.
- Engel, Pál (1996). Magyarország világi archontológiája, 1301–1457, I. [Secular Archontology of Hungary, 1301–1457, Volume I] (in Hungarian). História, MTA Történettudományi Intézete. ISBN 963-8312-44-0.
- Kádár, Tamás (2015). "Harcban a koronáért. I. Károly (Róbert) király uralkodásának első évei 1305 végéig [Fight for the Crown. The First Regnal Years of Charles I (Robert) until the End of 1305]". Történeti Tanulmányok. Acta Universitatis Debreceniensis (in Hungarian). 23: 42–111. ISSN 1217-4602.
- Kovács, Mihai (2015). ""Semper meliora prospiciuntur et utiliora attenduntur". Monoszló nb. Péter erdélyi püspök társadalmi és politikai kapcsolatai ["Semper meliora prospiciuntur et utiliora attenduntur" Political and Social Relationships of Peter Monoszló Bishop of Transylvania]" (PDF). Erdélyi Múzeum (in Hungarian). 77 (1): 1–13. ISSN 1453-0961.
- Maléth, Ágnes (2020). A Magyar Királyság és a Szentszék kapcsolata I. Károly korában (1301–1342) [The Relationship of the Hungarian Kingdom and the Holy See in the time of Charles I (1301–1342)] (in Hungarian). Pécsi Tudományegyetem BTK TTI Középkori és Koraújkori Történeti Tanszék. ISBN 978-963-429-500-6.
- Nekić, Antun (2020). "In Defense of Their See: The Bishops of Zagreb (1272–1301)". In Josipović, Ivan; Jurković, Miljenko (eds.). Aspice Hunc Opus Mirum: Zbornik Povodom Sedamdesetog Rođendana Nikole Jakšića // Festschrift on the occasion of Nikola jakšić's 70th birthday. International Research Center for Late Antiquity and the Middle Ages, Motovun, University of Zagreb; University of Zadar. pp. 371–384. ISBN 978-953-331-304-7.
- Zsoldos, Attila (2011). Magyarország világi archontológiája, 1000–1301 [Secular Archontology of Hungary, 1000–1301] (in Hungarian). História, MTA Történettudományi Intézete. ISBN 978-963-9627-38-3.

Michael Genus Bő Born: ? Died: 1304
Catholic Church titles
| Preceded by John | Bishop of Zagreb; 1296–1303 | Succeeded by Augustin Kažotić |
| Preceded by Gregory Bicskei | Archbishop of Esztergom; 1303–1304 | Succeeded by Thomas II |
