= Međurečje =

Međurečje may refer to:

- Međurečje (Ivanjica), a village in the municipality of Ivanjica, Serbia
- Međurečje (Kraljevo), a village in the municipality of Kraljevo, Serbia
- Međurečje (Rudo), a village in the municipality of Rudo, Republika Srpska, Bosnia and Herzegovina

or:

- Međureč (Jagodina), old name Međurečje, a village in the municipality of Jagodina, Serbia

== See also ==
- Međurječje, a village in the municipality of Čajniče, Republika Srpska, Bosnia and Herzegovina
- Međureč (disambiguation)
