= Međurječje =

Međurječje may refer to:

- Međurječje, Čajniče, a village in southeastern Bosnia and Herzegovina
- Međurječje, a medieval toponym believed to refer to Sokol Fortress (Piva)
- Međurječje, a medieval toponym believed to refer to Slavonia

== See also ==
- Međurečje (disambiguation)
