= Peter Bő =

Hungarian nobleman

Count of the Székelys
- Reign: 1294–1299 or 1300
- Predecessor: Mojs Ákos
- Successor: Vacant until 1315
- Died: after 1300
- Noble family: gens Bő
- Father: Stephen

Peter from the kindred Bő (Hungarian: Bő nembeli Péter), also known as Peter the Toothed (Hungarian: Fogas Péter; died after 1300), was a Hungarian nobleman at the end of the 13th century, who served as Count of the Székelys from 1294 to 1299 (or 1300).

== Career ==
Peter was born into the gens (clan) Bő, which originated from Somogy County, as one of the two sons of Stephen, who himself was the son of Ders. His older brother was clergyman Michael, Bishop of Zagreb, then Archbishop of Esztergom. Through their unidentified paternal aunt (a sister of Stephen), Michael and Peter were related to the gens Monoszló and its influential contemporary members, brothers Egidius, Gregory and Peter.

Due to the influence of his cousin, Peter Monoszló, Bishop of Transylvania, Peter Bő was appointed Count of the Székelys by King Andrew III in 1294, at the same time, when Ladislaus Kán took the office of Voivode of Transylvania, while Michael Bő became grand provost of Transylvania. Peter first appeared as count in a royal charter on 29 June 1294, when he was a member of a special delegation, which investigated an atrocity between the citizens of Esztergom, the local chapter and the clergymen of St. Thomas Church. In December 1294, Egidius Monoszló donated three villages of the Atyina (today Voćin, Croatia) lordship to brothers Michael and Peter, entrusting the Pécs Chapter to contribute his instruction. The land donation was confirmed by Andrew III on 9 January 1295. On 19 February 1299, Peter was still referred to as Count of the Székelys, when he was present during a possession contract between Master of the treasury Dominic Rátót and Julius Sártványvecse. According to a non-authentic charter, Peter still held the office in the next year. Ladislaus Kán took control of the whole of Transylvania after the death of Andrew III in 1301. During the ensuing interregnum, he also usurped the administration of Székely Land, thus the dignity of Count of the Székelys remained in vacancy until 1315, when Charles restored royal authority after Kán's death.

Egidius Monoszló made his first will and testament in 1298, when formally adopted his maternal relatives (cousins) Michael and Peter. Egidius donated Darnóc Castle (today Slatinski Drenovac, Croatia) to them, however both Peter and Michael had died before Egidius. Thus, in 1308, Egidius changed his last will and testament, when his son-in-law, Nicholas and his brothers from the Nyék branch of the gens Aba were granted Darnóc, which confirmed Peter Bő's death by that date. According to the above-mentioned non-authentic charter dated 28 October 1300, King Andrew III has given permission Peter Bő to hand over Darnóc to his wife. It is presumable that the document was forged in favour of Peter's wife (now widow) in the early 14th century, as her husband in fact never owned the estate.

== Sources ==
- Karácsonyi, János (1901). A magyar nemzetségek a XIV. század közepéig. I. kötet [The Hungarian genera until the middle of the 14th century, Vol. 1] (in Hungarian). Hungarian Academy of Sciences.
- Kordé, Zoltán (2001). "A székely ispáni méltóság kezdeteiről" [About the origin of the office of the count of the Székelys]. In Barbu, Violeta; Tüdős S., Kinga (eds.). Historia manet. Volum omagial. Demény Lajos emlékkönyv (in Hungarian). Editura Kriterion. pp. 199–207. OCLC 909140187.
- Kordé, Zoltán (2016). "Közigazgatás [Administration]; Katonáskodó székelyek az írott forrásokban [Székely soldiers in the written sources]". In Benkő, Elek; Oborni, Teréz (eds.). Székelyföld története, I. kötet: A kezdetektől 1562-ig (in Hungarian). Magyar Tudományos Akadémia Bölcsészettudományi Kutatóközpont, Erdélyi Múzeum-Egyesület, Haáz Rezső Múzeum. pp. 168–180, 305–320. ISBN 978-606-739-040-7.
- Kovács, Mihai (2015). "'Semper meliora prospiciuntur et utiliora attenduntur'. Monoszló nb. Péter erdélyi püspök társadalmi és politikai kapcsolatai" ['Semper meliora prospiciuntur et utiliora attenduntur'. Political and Social Relationships of Peter Monoszló Bishop of Transylvania] (PDF). Erdélyi Múzeum (in Hungarian). 77 (1): 1–13. ISSN 1453-0961.
- Zsoldos, Attila (2011). Magyarország világi archontológiája, 1000–1301 [Secular Archontology of Hungary, 1000–1301] (in Hungarian). História, MTA Történettudományi Intézete. ISBN 978-963-9627-38-3.

Peter Genus Bő Born: ? Died: after 1300
Political offices
Preceded by Mojs Ákos	Count of the Székelys; 1294–1299 or 1300	Vacant
