= Stephen Bő =

Hungarian nobleman

- Died: after 1268
- Noble family: gens Bő
- Issue: Michael; Peter
- Father: Ders

Stephen from the kindred Bő (Hungarian: Bő nembeli István; died after 1268) was a Hungarian nobleman in the 13th century.

== Family ==
Stephen was born into the so-called Ders branch of the gens (clan) Bő, which originated from Somogy County, and was one of the ancient ethnic Hungarian kindreds which had participated in the Hungarian conquest of the Carpathian Basin in late 9th century. His father was a certain Ders, whose parentage is unknown. Stephen had an unidentified sister.

Although Stephen originated from a relatively less significant branch of the Bő clan, his sister married Gregory II Monoszló, a prominent landowner in Southern Transdanubia and Slavonia. The marriage resulted the rapid political and social grow of Stephen's two sons Michael and Peter "the Toothed" by the end of the 14th century, as their cousins were the influential barons Egidius, Gregory III and prelate Peter Monoszló. When the latter became Bishop of Transylvania, Michael Bő was made as his grand provost. Subsequently, he served as Bishop of Zagreb, then Archbishop of Esztergom. Peter functioned as Count of the Székelys.

== Career ==
Stephen was referred to as curialis comes of Somogy County in 1266, a precursor office of the position vice-ispán (de facto administrator of the county). He served in this capacity, when Mojs held the dignity of ispán. Considering Stephen acted as his familiaris, historian Jenő Szűcs argued Stephen was curialis comes until 1267, when Mojs was replaced by Lawrence, son of Kemény. Szűcs also argued Stephen was one of the four noble judges (Hungarian: szolgabíró) in Somogy County since the early 1260s.

Following King Béla IV and his son Duke Stephen together confirmed the liberties of the "royal servants", from then on known as noblemen in their Decree of 1267, the ispán (head) of Somogy County, Lawrence was commissioned to review the ownership of several possessions in the county, as one of the articles of the Decree of 1267 ordained that "the lands of the nobles, which thou art ours, the peoples of the queen's free villages, or the courtiers, or the castle folks, are occupied or kept occupied under any pretext, must be returned to these nobles". The assembly of Somogy County delegated five local nobles to the ad-litem court chaired by Lawrence, including Stephen Bő, along with, for instance, his distant relative John Bő. Throughout the year 1268, the six-member commission performed the task. Stephen died shortly thereafter.

== Sources ==
- Karácsonyi, János (1901). A magyar nemzetségek a XIV. század közepéig. I. kötet [The Hungarian genera until the middle of the 14th century, Vol. 1] (in Hungarian). Hungarian Academy of Sciences.
- Szűcs, Jenő (1984). "Az 1267. évi dekrétum és háttere. Szempontok a köznemesség kialakulásához [The Decree of 1267 and its Background. Aspects for the Formation of the Lower Nobility]". In H. Balázs, Éva; Fügedi, Erik; Maksay, Ferenc (eds.). Mályusz Elemér emlékkönyv. Társadalom- és művelődéstörténeti tanulmányok (in Hungarian). Akadémiai Kiadó. pp. 341–394. ISBN 963-05-3272-7.
- Zsoldos, Attila (2011). Magyarország világi archontológiája, 1000–1301 [Secular Archontology of Hungary, 1000–1301] (in Hungarian). História, MTA Történettudományi Intézete. ISBN 978-963-9627-38-3.
