= Pusztakovácsi =

- Village
- Location of Somogy county in Hungary

- Location of Pusztakovácsi
- Coordinates: 46.54501°N 17.57242°E
- Country: Hungary
- Region: Southern Transdanubia
- County: Somogy
- District: Marcali
- RC Diocese: Kaposvár

Area
  - Total: 43.38 km^{2} (16.75 sq mi)

Population (2017)
  - Total: 821
  - Density: 18.9/km^{2} (49.0/sq mi)
- Demonym: pusztakovácsi
- Time zone: UTC+1 (CET)
  - Summer (DST): UTC+2 (CEST)
- Postal code: 8707
- Area code: (+36) 85
- NUTS 3 code: HU232
- MP: József Attila Móring (KDNP)
- Website: Pusztakovácsi Online

Pusztakovácsi is a village in Somogy county, Hungary.
