= Međureč (Jagodina) =

Coordinates: 43.9592°N 21.1806°E

Međureč Међуреч
- Village
- Interactive map of Međureč
- Country: Serbia
- District: Pomoravlje District
- Municipality: Jagodina

Population (2002)
  - Total: 430
- Time zone: UTC+1 (CET)
  - Summer (DST): UTC+2 (CEST)

Međureč (Serbian Cyrillic: Међуреч; old name Međurečje (Међуречје)) is a village in the municipality of Jagodina, Serbia. According to the 2002 census, the village had a population of 430.
