= Buzsák =

Buzsák Budžak (in Croatian)
- Village
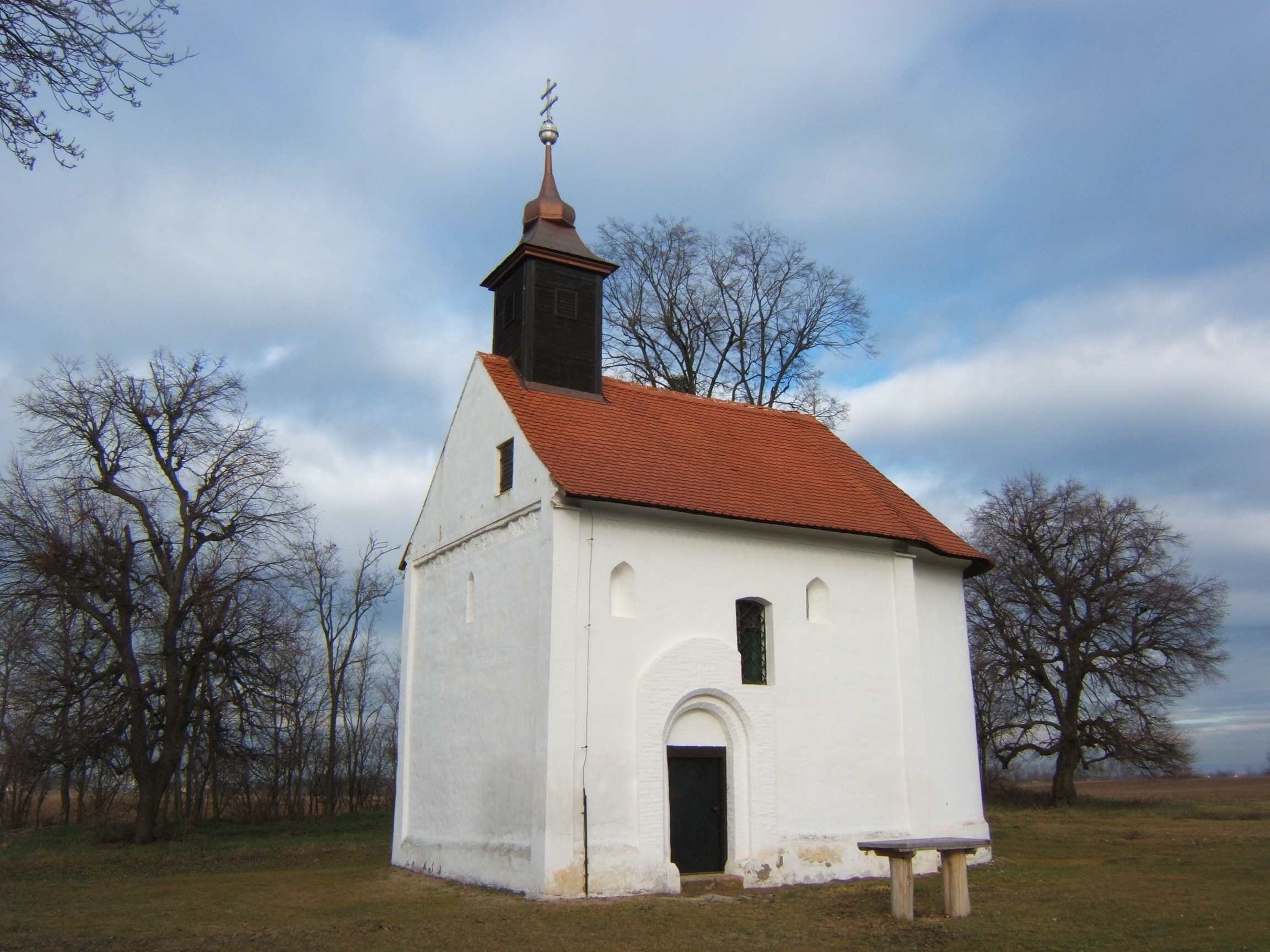
- Chapel of Buzsák

- Flag Coat of arms

- Location of Somogy county in Hungary

- Location of Buzsák
- Coordinates: 46.64310°N 17.58505°E
- Country: Hungary
- Region: Southern Transdanubia
- County: Somogy
- District: Fonyód
- RC Diocese: Kaposvár

Area
  - Total: 59.68 km^{2} (23.04 sq mi)

Population (2017)
  - Total: 1,318
  - Density: 22.08/km^{2} (57.20/sq mi)
- Demonym: buzsáki
- Time zone: UTC+1 (CET)
  - Summer (DST): UTC+2 (CEST)
- Postal code: 8695
- Area code: (+36) 85
- NUTS 3 code: HU232
- MP: József Attila Móring (KDNP)
- Website: Buzsák Online

Buzsák (Croatian: Budžak) is a village in Somogy county, Hungary.

== Etymology ==
A local legend says that Jesus Christ met a man from this village during his life on Earth. He asked him for bread, but the man did not give him any. So a curse fell on the village which meant that sorrow (Hungarian: bú) grew in every resident's sack (Hungarian: zsák).

According to the scientific explanation its name derives from the South Slavic world budžak (Hungarian: sarok, szeglet, English: corner).

== History ==
The village is more than 500 years old, with flourishing heritage of folklore, architectural traditions. After the Turkish Wars in Hungary (bw. 1526–1686) over Hungarians several Dalmatian, Illyrian, Croatian families settled in the village and the traditions were synthesised.

== Needleworks ==
Three types of traditional needleworks with blue, black, and red threads are popular. They can be seen in the Volklore Museum of the village.

== Romanesque church ==
The oldest building of the village is the romanesque church, the so-called White Chapel standing about 3 kilometers from the village. It was the village church of Akts village, destroyed during the Turkish wars. It was renewed in 1704. It has a carved wood renaissance altar which was later moved to the Catholic Church of the village, erected in 1791.

== Cellars ==
In the Saint John Hill there are old cellars, where the masters offer their fine vines for the visitors.
