= Bodrog, Somogy County =

Bodrog
- Village
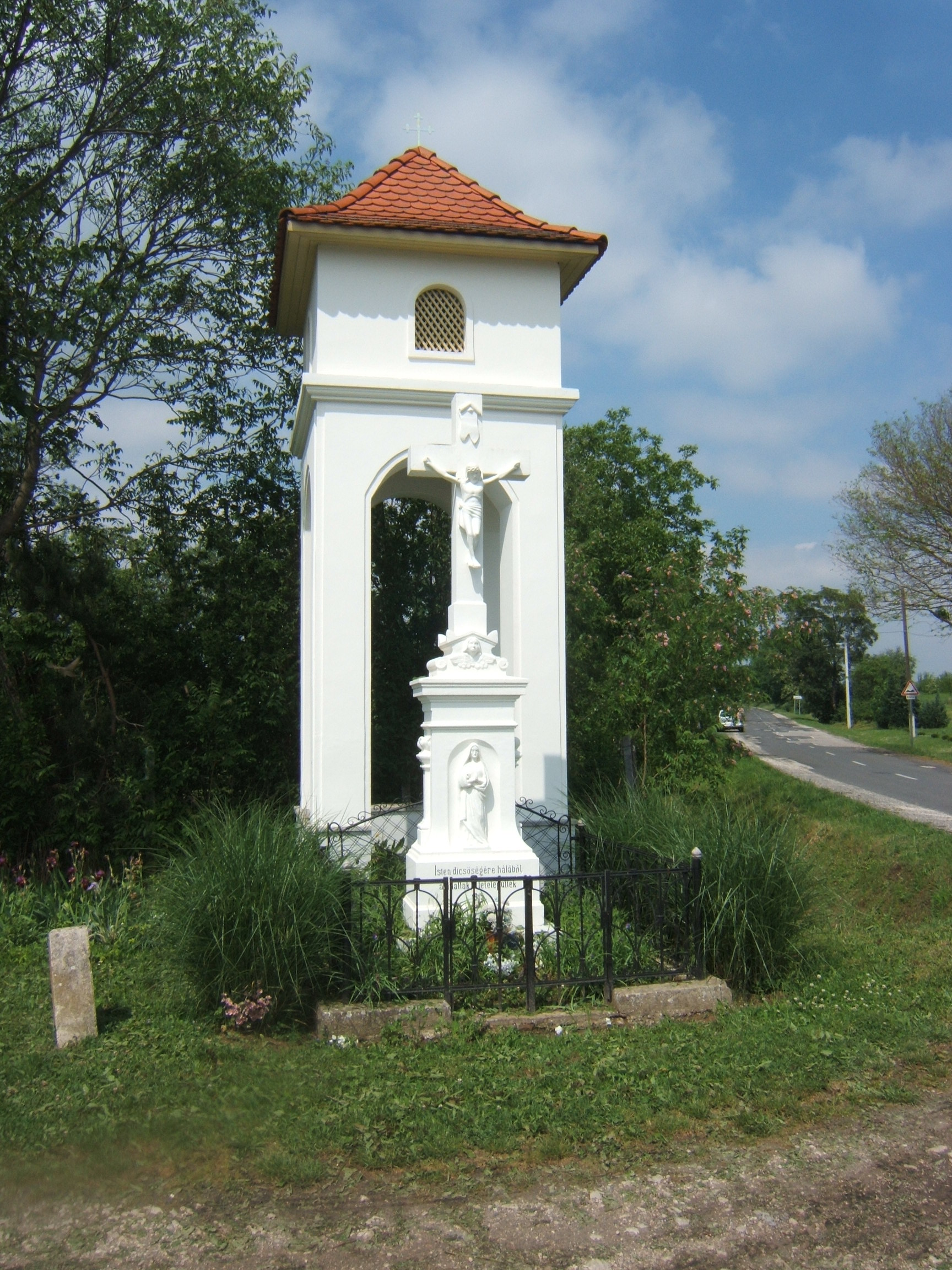
- Northern bell tower in Bodrog

- Coat of arms

- Location of Somogy county in Hungary

- Location of Bodrog (village)
- Coordinates: 46.48362°N 17.66056°E
- Country: Hungary
- Region: Southern Transdanubia
- County: Somogy
- District: Kaposvár
- RC Diocese: Kaposvár

Area
  - Total: 14.78 km^{2} (5.71 sq mi)

Population (2017)
  - Total: 362
  - Density: 24.5/km^{2} (63.4/sq mi)
- Demonym: bodrogi
- Time zone: UTC+1 (CET)
  - Summer (DST): UTC+2 (CEST)
- Postal code: 7439
- Area code: (+36) 82
- NUTS 3 code: HU232
- MP: József Attila Móring (KDNP)
- Website: Bodrog Online

Bodrog is a village in Somogy county, Hungary.
