= Mezőcsokonya =

- Village
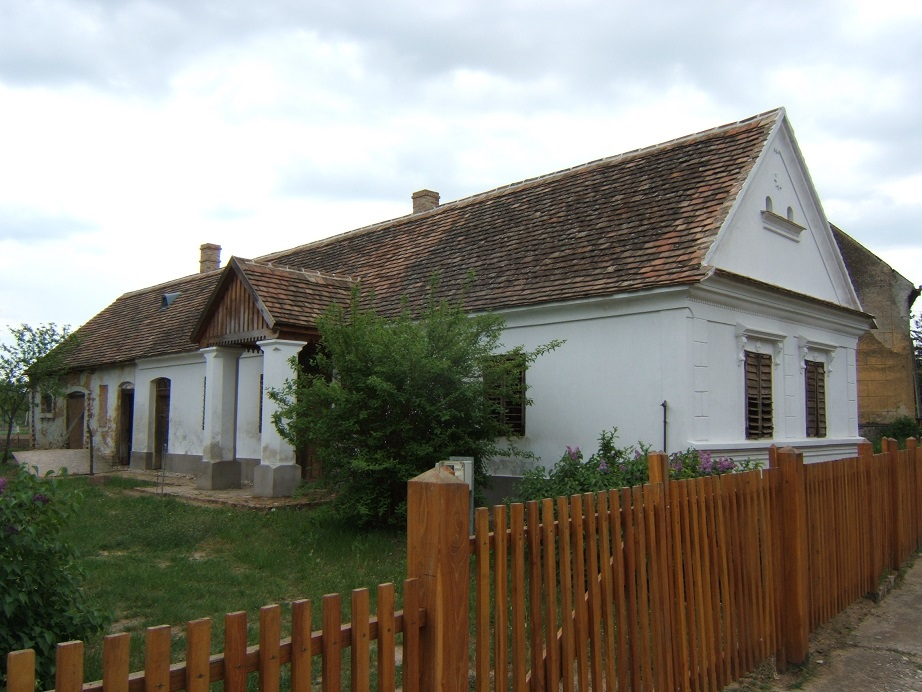
- Traditional country house in Mezőcsokonya

- Coat of arms

- Location of Somogy county in Hungary

- Location within Hungary
- Coordinates: 46°25′54″N 17°38′47″E
- Country: Hungary
- Region: Southern Transdanubia
- County: Somogy
- District: Kaposvár
- RC Diocese: Kaposvár

Area
  - Total: 30.78 km^{2} (11.88 sq mi)
- Elevation: 162 m (531 ft)

Population (2017)
  - Total: 1,176
  - Density: 38.21/km^{2} (98.95/sq mi)
- Demonym: mezőcsokonyai
- Time zone: UTC+1 (CET)
  - Summer (DST): UTC+2 (CEST)
- Postal code: 7434
- Area code: (+36) 82
- NUTS 3 code: HU232
- MP: József Attila Móring (KDNP)
- Website: Mezőcsokonya Online

Mezőcsokonya is a village in Somogy county, Hungary.

== Gallery ==
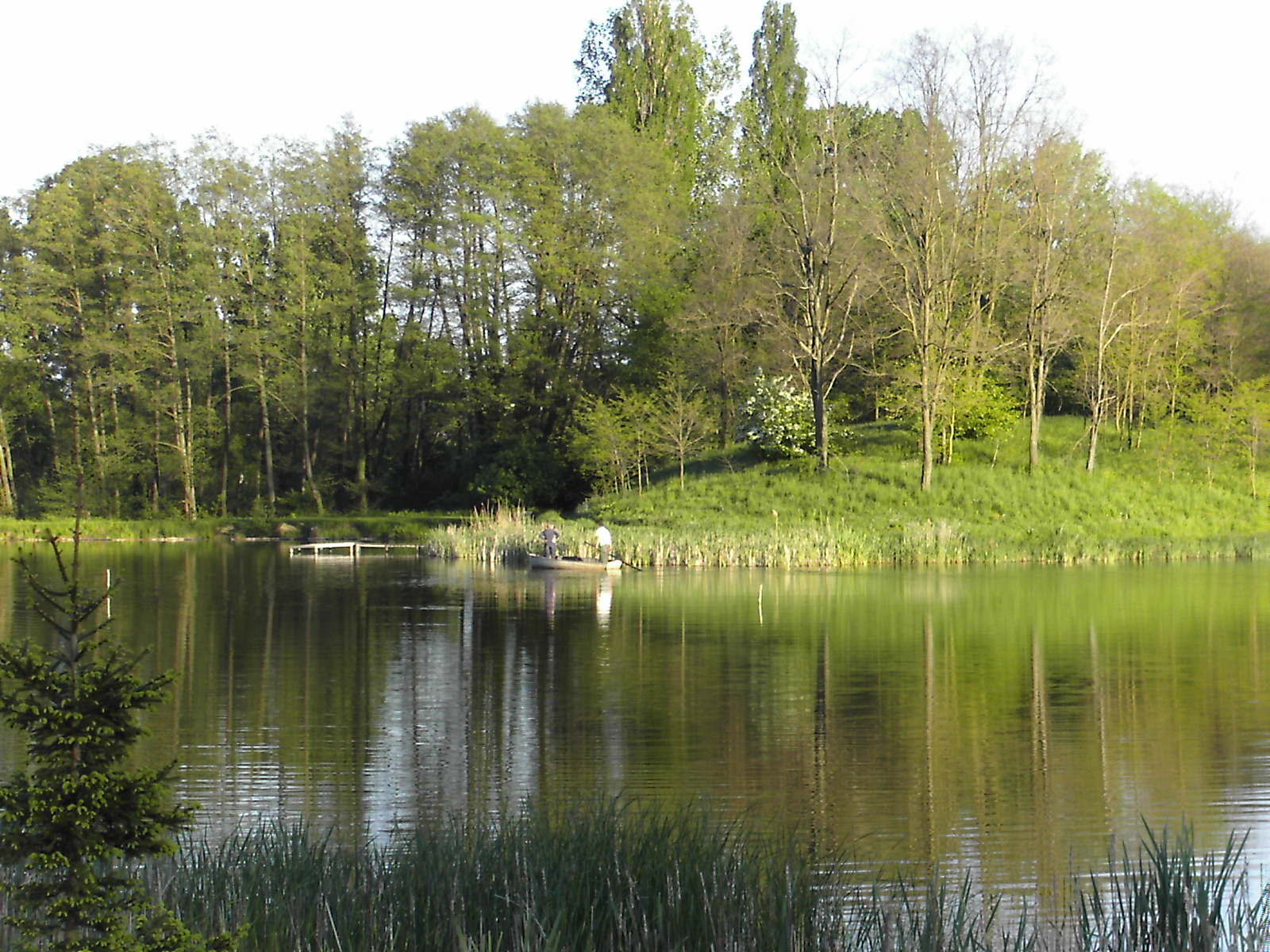
Lake in Mezőcsokonya

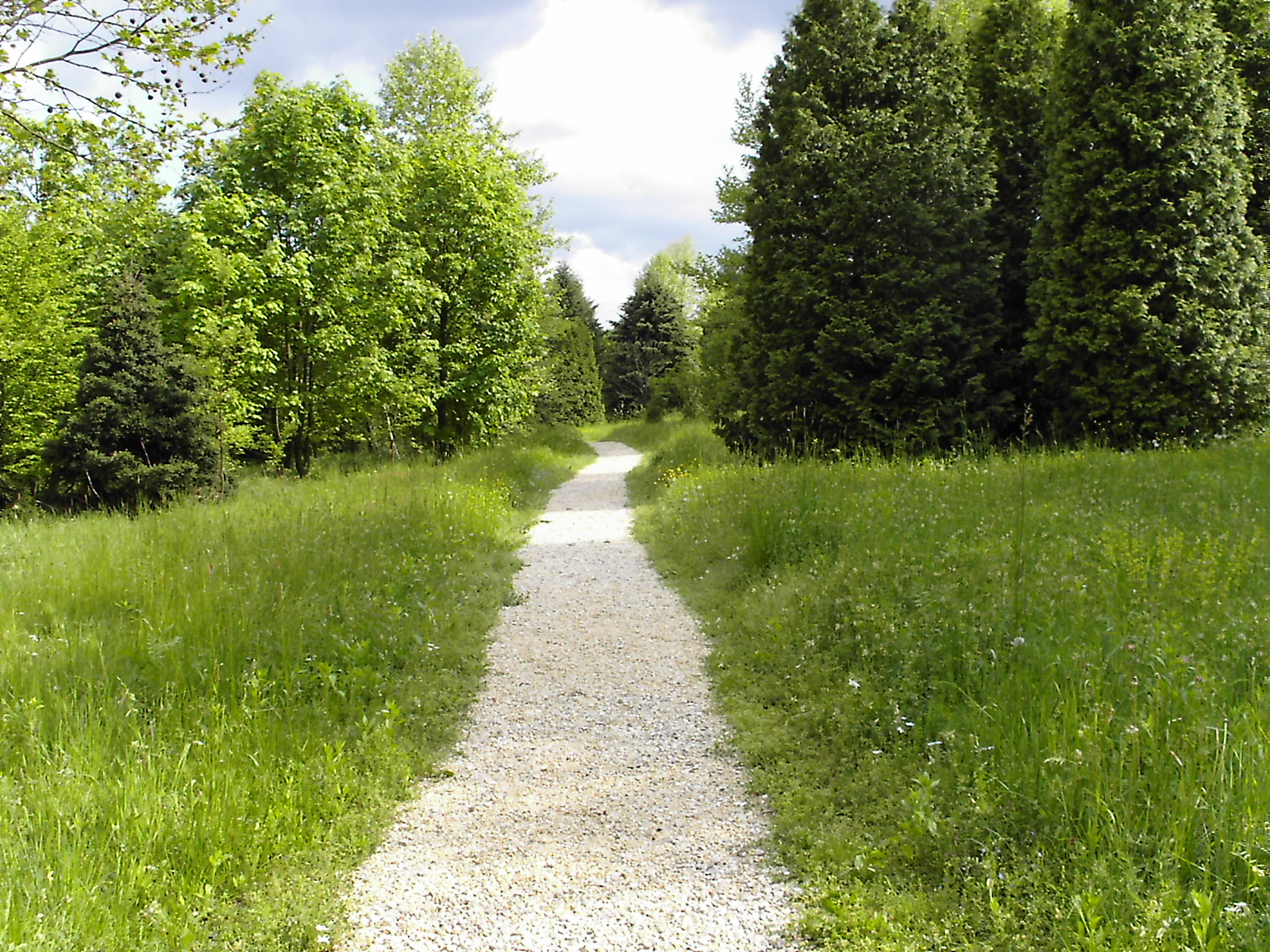
Path in the park in Mezőcsokonya

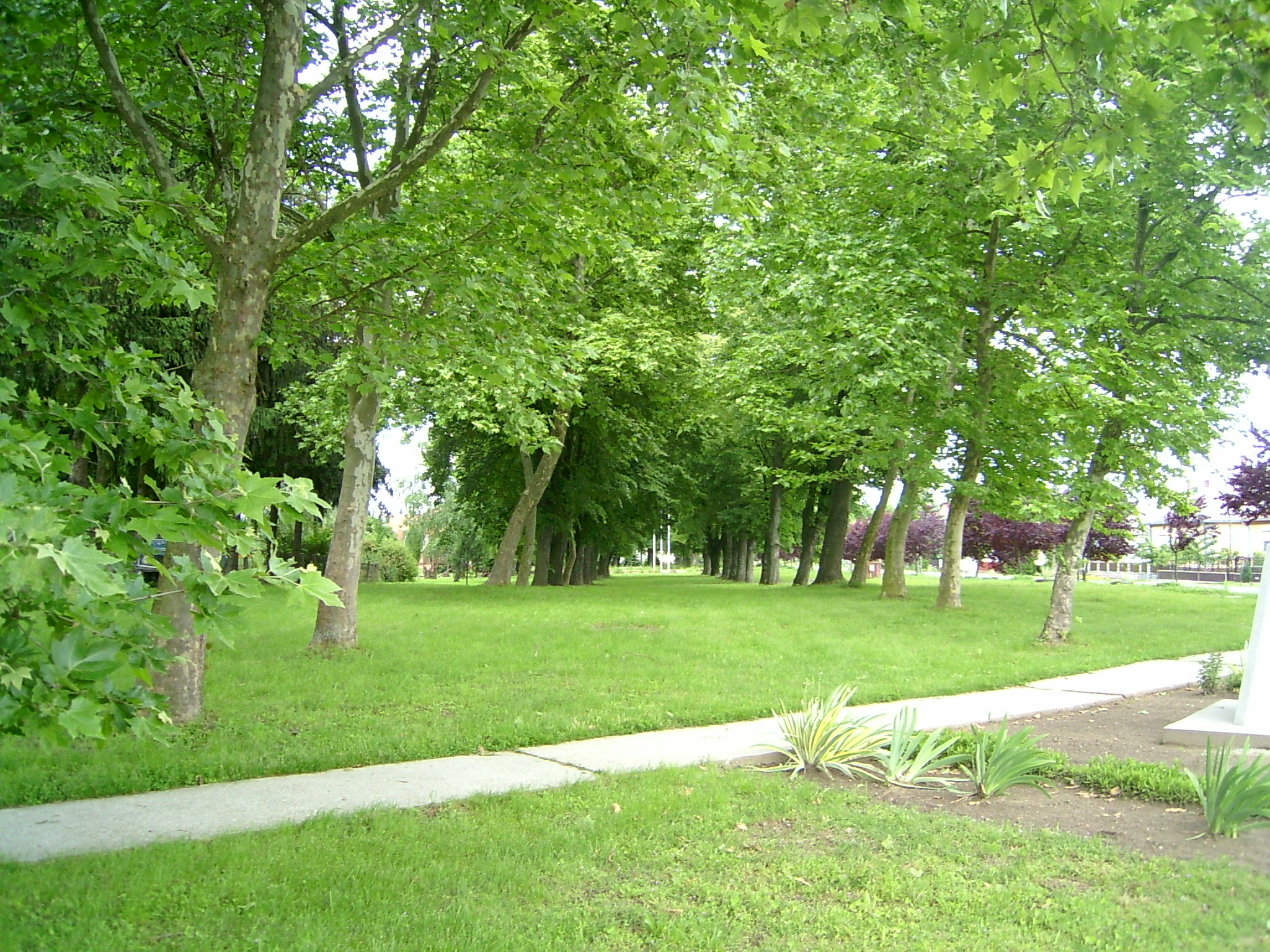
Park in Mezőcsokonya
