= Gyugy =

- Village
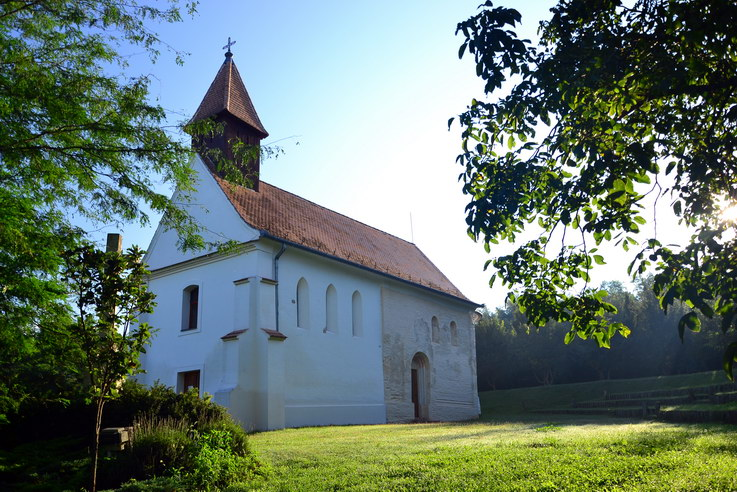
- Church of Gyugy from the Árpád era

- Coat of arms

- Location of Somogy county in Hungary

- Location of Gyugy
- Coordinates: 46.69164°N 17.68353°E
- Country: Hungary
- Region: Southern Transdanubia
- County: Somogy
- District: Fonyód
- RC Diocese: Kaposvár

Area
  - Total: 15.31 km^{2} (5.91 sq mi)

Population (2017)
  - Total: 294
  - Density: 19.2/km^{2} (49.7/sq mi)
- Demonym: gyugyi
- Time zone: UTC+1 (CET)
  - Summer (DST): UTC+2 (CEST)
- Postal code: 8692
- Area code: (+36) 85
- NUTS 3 code: HU232
- MP: József Attila Móring (KDNP)
- Website: Gyugy Online

Gyugy is a village in Somogy county, Hungary.

The settlement is part of the Balatonboglár wine region.

== Sightseeings ==
Beautiful memorial of the village is the Árpád age church on the southern hills. It was renewed after an archaeological and architectural investigation in the last years. This church is a gem of the Somogy-side, southern Balaton side.
