= Kölked =

Village in Baranya, Hungary

Kölked Altinum (in Latin)
- Village
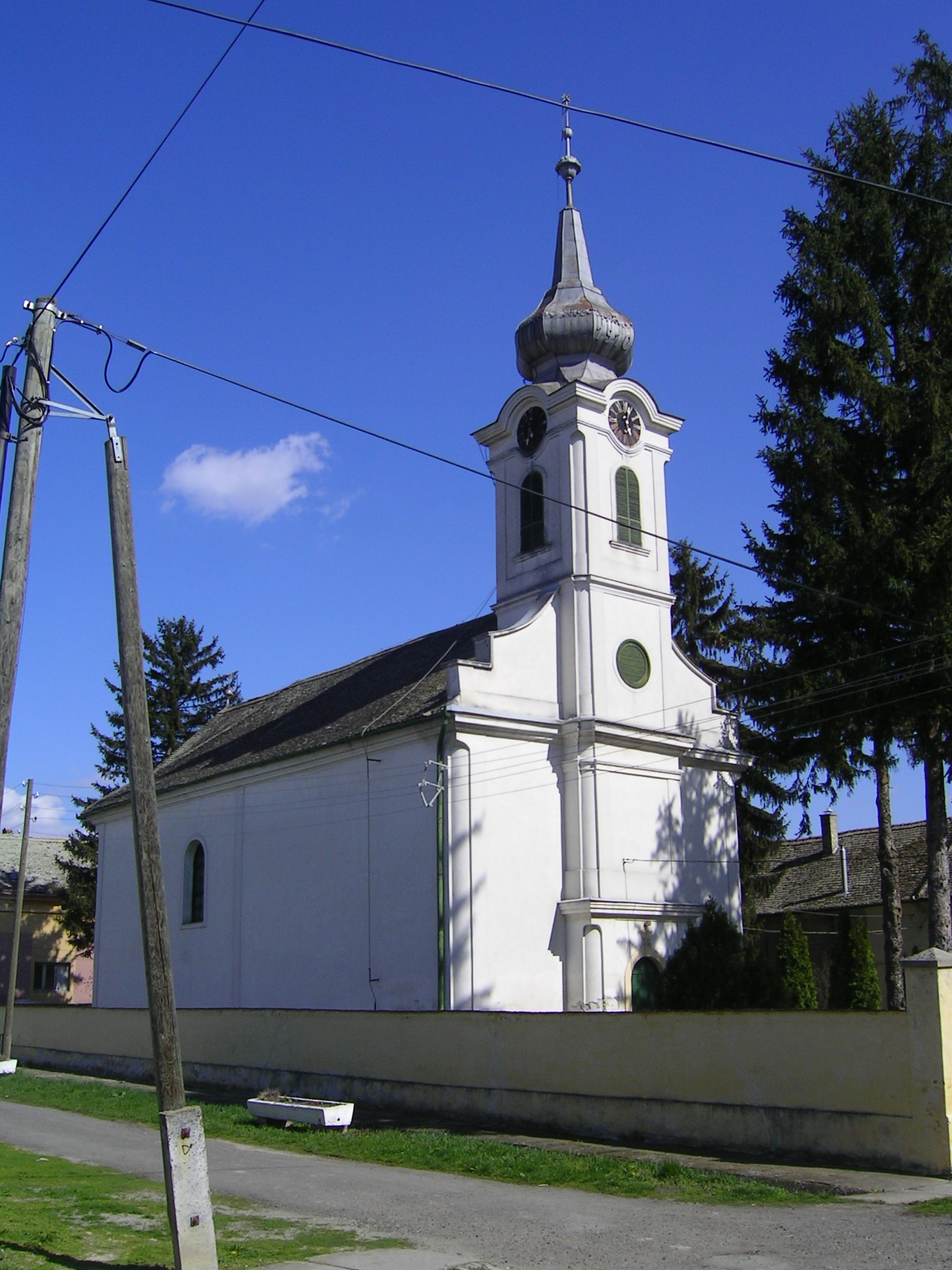
- Kölked ref
- Interactive map of Kölked
- Coordinates: 45°57′N 18°42′E
- Country: Hungary
- County: Baranya
- Time zone: UTC+1 (CET)
  - Summer (DST): UTC+2 (CEST)

Kölked is a village in Baranya county, Hungary. Until the end of World War II, the inhabitants were Danube Swabians. Most of the former German settlers were expelled to Germany and Austria in 1945–1948, as a result of the Potsdam Agreement. Only a few Germans of Hungary live there, the majority today are the descendants of Hungarians from the Czechoslovak–Hungarian population exchange.

== Demographics ==
In 2001, the population of Baranya county numbered 407,448 inhabitants, including:

- Hungarians = 375,611 (92.19%)
- Germans = 22,720 (5.58%)
- Romani = 10,623 (2.61%)
- Croats = 7,294 (1.79%)
- others.
