= Türje (genus) =

Genus (gens) Türje
- Country: Kingdom of Hungary
- Founded: late 12th century (?)
- Founder: Gecse I
- Cadet branches: a, Szentgrót branch: House of Szentgróti; b, Bér branch: House of Béri; House of Orbonai

Türje (Tyürje or Türgye) was the name of a gens (Latin for "clan"; nemzetség in Hungarian) in the Kingdom of Hungary. The Szentgróti (Szentgiróti), Orbonay and Zalabéry families belong to this genus.

The village of Türje was first mentioned in 1234. The monastery of the premontre monks was founded at the beginning of the 13th century. In this time, the namesake kindred was the landowner of the village and the neighboring villages, including Zalaszentgrót too.

== History ==
The Türje (also Gurle or Jurle) kindred was one of the most significant clans in Zala County, beside the Atyusz and Hahót families, centered around the namesake village Türje. The earliest known member of the kindred was Gecse (I), who is known only by name. His sons were Joachim and Gecse (II). Historians János Karácsonyi and, consequently, Pál Engel considered that Denis (II), the most powerful member of the clan, was also the son of Gecse (I). However, his father was Denis (I), who was possibly the brother of Gecse (I).

=== Rise ===
Joachim was a faithful soldier of Andrew II of Hungary. Around 1210, he served as the first known Count of Hermannstadt (or Szeben; Hungarian: szebeni ispán), and in this capacity, he was the head of the Transylvanian Saxons living in the wider region of Hermannstadt (now Sibiu in Romania). In this capacity, Joachim led an army of Saxons, Vlachs, Székelys and Pechenegs across the Carpathian Mountains to fight for Boril of Bulgaria against the rebellious Cumans, according to a royal charter issued in 1250. Joachim's four relatives were killed during the campaign. He also participated in Andrew's military campaign against the Principality of Galicia in 1211. For his military service and merits, Joachim was granted lands in Slanje in Križevci County (today in Croatia), which belonged to the fort of Zala prior to that.

His brother Gecse (II) served as ispán of Zala County in 1225 and as ispán of Bars County from 1236 to 1240. He entered the service of the young duke Béla, the eldest son and heir of King Andrew II. It is possible that he acquired several landholdings in Bars County during his term as ispán, due to the future properties of his kindred there. Béla IV donated the villages Csoma and Gortva in Gömör County (present-day Čamovce and Gortva in Slovakia, respectively) to Gecse in 1240, after the monarch confiscated both landholdings from Bánk Bár-Kalán.

=== Peak ===
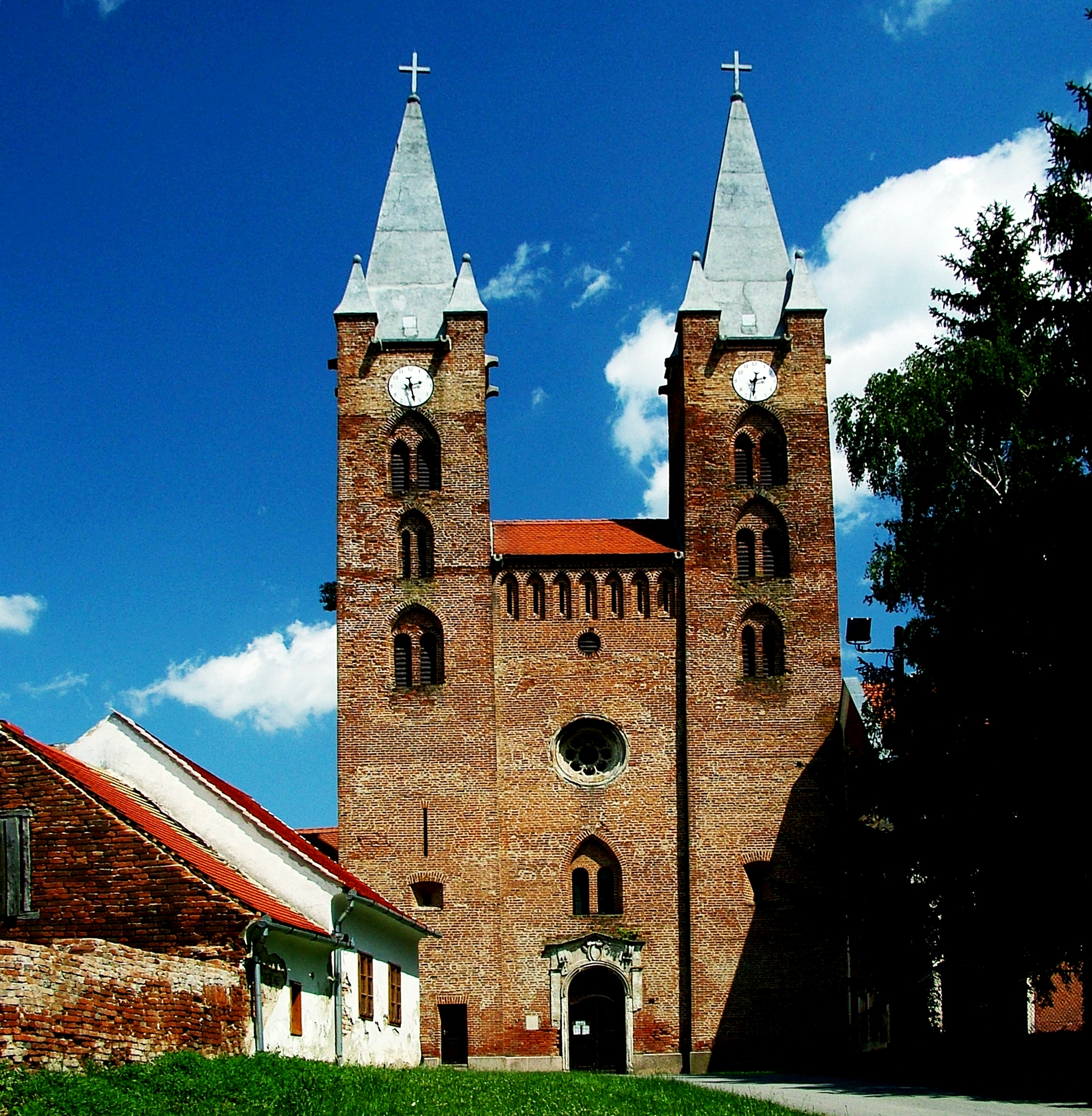
Premonstratensian church of Türje, erected by Denis Türje around 1234

Their cousin, Denis (II), born in the 1200s, was a childhood friend and companion of Duke Béla. He distinguished himself militarily in various campaigns of the duke in the period between 1228 and 1233 (in Bulgaria, Halych and Austria). Under Béla's duchy, Denis served as Voivode of Transylvania from 1233 to 1235. After Béla IV ascended the Hungarian throne in September 1235, Denis was made Master of the horse. He served in this capacity at least until September 1241. Beside that he also functioned as ispán (count) of the stablemen in 1235 and ispán of Temes County in 1240. For his loyalty and military service during Béla's ducal years, Denis was granted the lordship Tapolcsány (present-day Topoľčany, Slovakia) with the surrounding villages – Tavarnok (Tovarníky), Jalovec and Racsic (Račice, borough of Nitrica) in Nyitra County in 1235. Denis participated in the Battle of Mohi on 11 April 1241, when the advanced Mongols defeated the Hungarians. He was among the accompaniment of Béla IV, who fled the battlefield and was pursued as far as the Dalmatian Coast. Around September 1241, Béla appointed him Ban of Slavonia. After 1242, he also adopted the title "Ban of Maritime Provinces", which covered the area of Dalmatian coastal cities. He held the dignity at least until November 1244. In this capacity, he became a central figure of Béla's Dalmatian policy. In 1245, Denis – at the height of his career – was appointed Palatine of Hungary, the second-highest secular office after the king and held the position until 1246. Beside that he also functioned as ispán of Somogy County. He served as Master of the treasury in 1247. In addition, he also functioned as ispán of Pozsony County from 1247 to 1248. He was appointed palatine for the second time in 1248. Denis served as ispán of Szolnok County between 1251 and 1255, until his death.

Since the early 1240s, Denis further increased his wealth, acquiring possessions. For his services during the Mongol invasion and the subsequent Dalmatian years, Denis was granted Orbona (Obrovnica), Haraszt and Cerova-Brda (near present-day Marinovec) in Križevci County from Béla IV in 1244. He bought Barlabáshida in Zala County for 40 silver marks in 1246 (a year later, Denis donated the land to the Türje monastery). Denis was also an owner of two lands neighboring Csoma and Gortva in Gömör County. Since the second half of the 1240s, Denis held his permanent residence in Szentgrót. It is plausible that Denis or his relative Thomas (I) erected the local fort. Béla also donated the village Bonyha (today Bahnea, Romania) to Denis, while he served as ispán of Szolnok County.

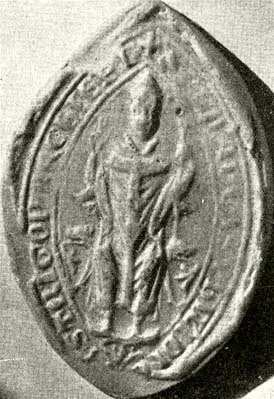
The seal of Archbishop Philip (I) Türje, 1272

Prior to 1234, Denis (II) founded a Premonstratensian provostry in Türje dedicated to Blessed Virgin Mary. Belonging to the Diocese of Veszprém, he invited canons regular from the abbey of Csorna. Soon, the Türje Abbey became an important place of authentication. Denis' involvement in the foundation not entirely clear. According to a later, 18th-century tradition within the Order of Premonstratensians, the provostry was established in 1184, which was previously even announced by an epigraph on the wall of the monastery and attributed the foundation a certain comes Lampert. A non-authentic letter of donation in the name of Béla IV refers to 1241 or 1242 as date of the foundation by Denis. According to the Catalogus Ninivensis, which contains a list of Premonstratensian churches in present-day Hungary and Transylvania (Circaria Hungariae) in 1234, the Provostry of Türje was already stood. Pope Alexander IV referred to Denis Türje as founder and benefactor of the monastery in 1260. It is possible that Denis re-founded the monastery after its destruction during the First Mongol invasion of Hungary. During and after the foundation, Denis handed over several landholdings of the Türje kindred to the newly erected monastery. For instance, in 1247, Denis donated the estates Barlabáshida (today a borough of Pakod), Vitenyéd (present-day Bagod), four portions, two mills and half of the river duty in Szentgrót to the provostry. He also granted the land Apatovec in Križevci County to the Premonstratensians in 1249. Some of his relatives followed his example with land donations. For instance, his sister (widow of a certain Ákos) handed over her estate in Batyk to the provostry in 1251. Following his death in 1255, some family members attempted to recover these estates citing that Denis donated those without their consent. The lawsuit lasted until 1322.

Denis (II) died without male descendants, his acquisitions were inherited by the descendants of Joachim and Gecse (II), from whom the Szentgrót and Bér branches originated, respectively. Among them, Thomas (I) and Philip (I), the sons of Joachim, maintained prominence in the royal court. Thomas fought in the Battle of Mohi too and later served in Dalmatia under Denis (II). He was styled as ispán of the royal castle district of Karakó located in Vas County from 1250 to 1263. His younger brother Philip (I) entered ecclesiastical career: he was provost of Dömös (1246–1248), Bishop of Zagreb (1248–1262) and Archbishop of Esztergom (1262–1272) and faithfully served King Béla IV and Queen Maria Laskarina throughout his career. For their merits and faithful royal service, Béla IV returned the land Slanje to Philip and Thomas in 1248, since King Andrew's royal donation for their father Joachim was overturned at the beginning of Béla's reign in 1236–1237. Béla IV granted the land Prodaviz in Križevci County (present-day Virje, Croatia) to Thomas in 1267. Beside his ecclesiastical positions, Philip (I) was a skilled diplomat of Béla IV. He also mediated the peace between the king and his rebellious son Duke Stephen after their brief civil wars in 1262 and 1265. Philip began the first steps towards the canonization of Saint Margaret. In comparison to them, their cousins Pousa (I) and Gecse (III) – the sons of Gecse (II) - remained marginal nobles. Pousa held his residence in Bér, becoming ancestor of the Béri family, by 1254, when he contributed to the donation of Batyk to the Türje monastery.

=== Marginalization ===
Following the death of Philip (I), the Türje kindred gradually lost its political influence. The Szentgrót branch consisted of the three sons of Thomas (I) – Denis (III), Philip (II) and Thomas (II). They first appear in contemporary records in September 1270, when the newly crowned Stephen V of Hungary confirmed and transcribed his father's aforementioned donation of letter regarding Prodaviz and its tax privileges to the brothers. As a young noble, Denis was styled as Chancellor of the Cupbearers in 1270, while Philip served as ispán of Győr and Vas counties in the early 1270s. From the second half of the 1270s onwards, Philip was eliminated from the Hungarian elite due to the anarchy that increasingly dominated the kingdom, through which the powerful oligarchic families continued to expand their authority. In Transdanubia, the Kőszegis established a coherent province throughout the decades.

Prior to 1279, the brothers concluded a property distribution agreement with their relative Pousa (I) from the clan's Bér branch, who thus acquired the clan's lands beyond the Drava, while Denis, Philip and Thomas retained the possessions in Zala County. In 1279, Pousa (I) and Gecse (III) requested King Ladislaus IV of Hungary to exempt their estates Orbona, Cerova-Brda and Racina from the jurisdiction of the ispán of Križevci County and to place them under the direct authority of the Ban of Slavonia. The Türje clan was driven out from Upper Hungary by the late 1270s; Matthew II Csák acquired the lordship Tapolcsány with the surrounding villages from them. Following the death of his elder brother Denis, Philip became head of the family's Szentgrót branch. The fort of Szentgrót became permanent residence of the emerging Szentgróti family. All living members of the clan agreed to Lawrence and Peregrine (I) to sell Dabronc in 1281. In addition to the Szentgrót and Bér branches, the document lists certain Alexander, Peter, sons of John, Blaise, son of Iknár, Berceus (II), son of Berceus (I), and Stephen, Gregory, Matthias and Herbord (II), the sons of Herbord (I). In 1284, the members of the Bér branch pledged their lordship Racina to Ivan Kőszegi.

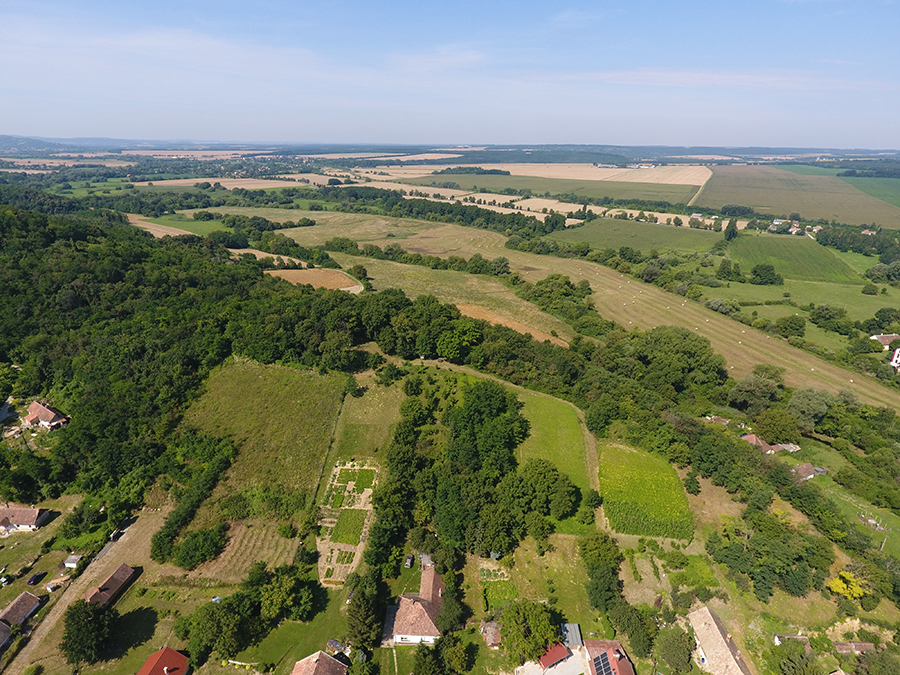
The remains of the fort of Zalabér

The members of the Türje kindred divided their possessions among themselves for the second time in 1299. The Szentgrót branch, consisted of Philip, Thomas (II) and Desiderius (I), reached an agreement with the clan's Bér branch. Given their very close kinship, the parties forgave each other for all hostility, strife, murder, destruction, arson, robbery and other injustices. The document narrates that Philip and Thomas unlawfully seized Batyk in Zala County, despite the first division agreement and against the will of the sons of the late Pousa (I). In accordance with the 1299 treaty, Philip and his branch were granted the castle of Szentgrót with its four villages Szentgrót, Zsid, Bárba and Udvarnok (present-day boroughs of Zalaszentgrót). The Bér branch, i.e. John, Pousa (II) and Mark – sons of Pousa (I) – were granted most of the lands laid beyond the Drava, including Orbona, Cerova-Brda (Zalaburda), in addition to the estates Bér, Batyk and Hídvég in Zala County, and Püspöki along the river Tisza in Szolnok County. Initially, Pousa (II) also laid claim to the portion in Türje once possessed by the late Denis (III), who had earlier violent conflicts with the clan's Bér branch over the boundaries of the ancestral seat. Pousa eventually relinquished this claim in favor of the orphan Desiderius (I), son of Denis. Pousa (II) was archdeacon of Zala, then provost of Veszprém, while John and Mark were progenitors of the Béri and Orbonai noble families, respectively.

In 1306, both the Szentgrót and Bér branches agreed to let their relative Peregrine (I) donate the lands Barlabáshida (present-day a borough of Pakod) and Vitenyéd (present-day a borough of Bagod) in Zala County to the clan's monastery, the Premonstratensian church of Türje. In an undated charter, another family member Nicholas, son of Moses bequeathed his estate Öcse and vineyards in Tekenye to Peregrine (I) and his sons in addition to the usufruct right of his wife. In 1308, Peregrine (II) sold his remaining portion Barlabáshida to John and Mark from the clan's Bér branch.

By the beginning of the 14th century, Philip was either forced to enter or voluntarily joined the service of Matthew III Csák, the most prominent oligarch during the era of interregnum, becoming his familiaris. Historian Gyula Kristó considered that Philip was forced to swear loyalty, when Matthew Csák expanded his influence over Nógrád and Gömör counties around 1308 or 1309. In contrast, Virág Varga argued the Csáks had already extended their authority to the members of the family decades earlier, and Philip served them at least since the early 1280s. He represented his lord in the national diet in November 1308, where Charles of Anjou was elected and proclaimed king of Hungary. On behalf of Matthew Csák, he also attended the second coronation of Charles I on 15 June 1309 in Buda. Philip possessed Vígvár (present-day Veselé, Slovakia) which Matthew Csák perhaps bestowed upon him for his services. Sometime in the second half of the 1310s, Philip left the allegiance of Matthew Csák and swore loyalty to Charles I who then waged war against the oligarchic domains. Perhaps this covenant was sealed by his marriage with Clara, whose brother rector Ladislaus was a strong confidant of the king. Thereafter, his sons – Nicholas (I) and Ladislaus (I) – served in the royal court; the former entered the service of Nicholas Hahót, Ban of Slavonia while the latter was a courtly knight. Philip is last mentioned as a living person in March 1335, when he and his three elder sons donated the estate Besenyő in Somogy County (present-day Balatonszentgyörgy) to the Türje monastery.

== Notable members ==
- Joachim, ispán (comes) of Szeben County (1210), ancestor of the Szentgróti family
- Gecse, ispán of Zala (1225) and Bars Counties (1236–1240)
- Denis (d. 1255), voivode of Transylvania (1233–1234), ban of Slavonia (1241–1244/5), palatine (1245–1246; 1248)
- Philip (d. 1272), bishop of Zagreb (1248–1262), chancellor (1262–1270; 1272), archbishop of Esztergom (1262–1272), first perpetual ispán of Esztergom County (1270–1272)

== Family tree ==
- Gecse I
  - Joachim (fl. 1210–1214)
    - Thomas I (fl. 1241–1267) --> Szentgrót branch
      - Denis III (fl. 1270)
        - Desiderius (fl. 1281–1306)
      - Philip II (fl. 1270–1335) ∞ Clara, sister of Ladislaus, son of Werner
        - Szentgróti family
      - Thomas II (fl. 1270–1306)
    - Philip I (fl. 1241–1272†)
    - a daughter ∞ Demetrius Zselizi
  - Gecse II (fl. 1225–1240) --> Bér branch
    - Pousa I (fl. 1254–1279)
      - Nicholas (fl. 1281–1284)
      - John (fl. 1281–1308)
        - Stephen (fl. 1322–1328)
        - Béri family
      - Pousa II (fl. 1281–1323)
      - Mark (fl. 1281–1332)
        - Orbonai family
    - Gecse III (fl. 1276–1279)
- Denis I
  - Denis II (fl. 1217–1255†)
  - a daughter (fl. 1251) ∞ Ákos N (d. before 1251)

== Sources ==
- Engel, Pál (1996). Magyarország világi archontológiája, 1301–1457, I. [Secular Archontology of Hungary, 1301–1457, Volume I] (in Hungarian). História, MTA Történettudományi Intézete. ISBN 963-8312-44-0.
- Karácsonyi, János (1900). A magyar nemzetségek a XIV. század közepéig. [The Hungarian genera until the middle of the 14th century] (in Hungarian). Hungarian Academy of Sciences.
- Kovács, Imre (1991). A türjei Premontrei Prépostság története [The History of the Premonstratensian Provostry of Türje] (in Hungarian). Zalai Gyűjtemény 32., Zala Megyei Levéltár. ISBN 963-7226-08-7.
- Varga, Virág (2024). "A Türje nembeli Szentgrótiak a 13. században és a 14. század első felében [The Szentgróti Family of the Türje Kindred in the 13th Century and the First Half of 14th Century]". In Hunyadi, Sándor; et al. (eds.). Micae Mediaevales XIII (in Hungarian). Eötvös Loránd University. pp. 121–149. ISSN 2062-2198.
- Zsoldos, Attila (2011). Magyarország világi archontológiája, 1000–1301 [Secular Archontology of Hungary, 1000–1301] (in Hungarian). História, MTA Történettudományi Intézete. ISBN 978-963-9627-38-3.
