= Denis Türje =

Hungarian baron and landowner

Denis (II) Türje
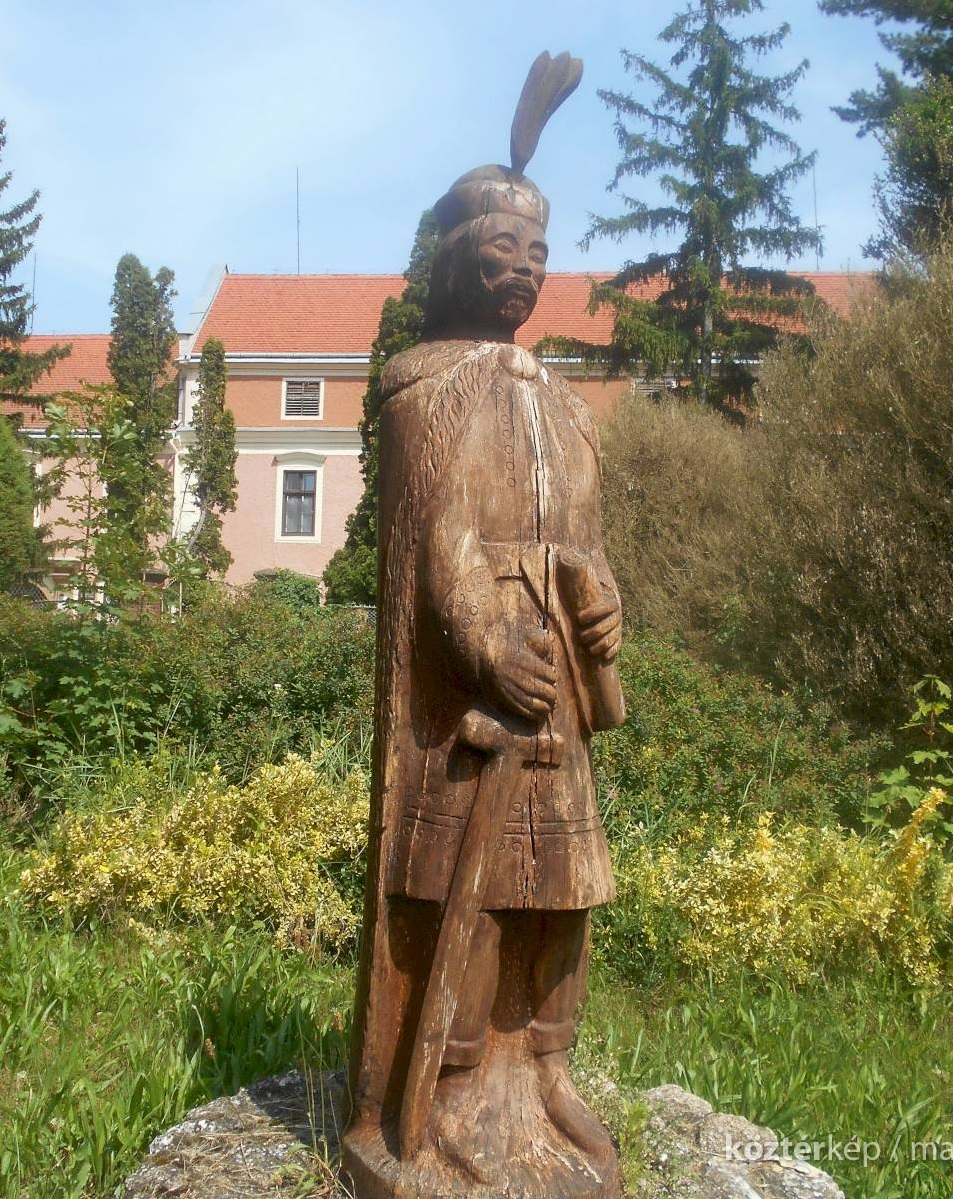
- Wooden sculpture of Denis Türje in Türje by József Rőti (2002)

Palatine of Hungary
- Reign: 1245–1246; 1248
- Predecessor: Ladislaus Kán (1st term); Stephen Gutkeled (2nd term)
- Successor: Stephen Gutkeled (1st term); Roland Rátót (2nd term)
- Born: 1200s
- Died: 1255
- Buried: Premonstratensian Church of Türje
- Noble family: gens Türje
- Father: Denis I

Denis (II) from the kindred Türje (Hungarian: Türje nembeli (II.) Dénes) or nicknamed Denis the Big-nosed (Hungarian: Nagyorrú Dénes; Latin: cum magno nasu; died 1255) was a powerful Hungarian baron, landowner and military leader in the first half of the 13th century, who held several secular positions during the reign of kings Andrew II and Béla IV. Denis was a childhood friend and staunch supporter of the latter throughout his life. He was the most notable member of the gens Türje.

== Family and monastery ==
Denis (II) was born into the Szentgrót branch of the gens Türje from Zala County as the son of Denis (I). He had an unidentified sister. In the old charters, the village of Türje, eponymous estate of the kindred, was first mentioned in 1234. In this time, the namesake kindred was the landowner of the village and the neighboring villages too. Formerly, historian János Karácsonyi incorrectly assumed that Denis (II) was the son of Gecse (I) and made a difference between him and Denis, who served as master of the horse. It is possible that Gecse (I) and Denis (I) were brothers.

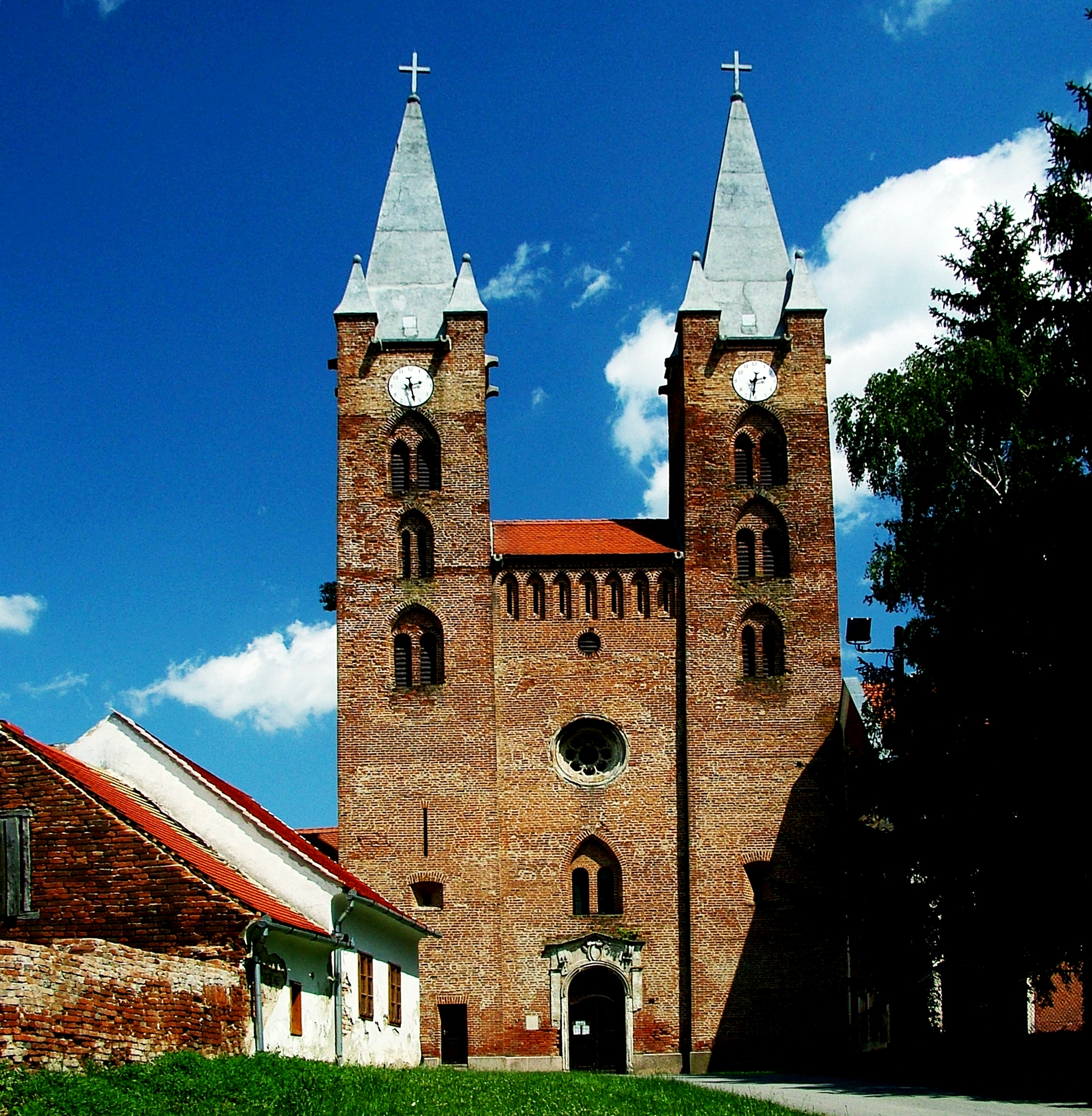
Premonstratensian church of Türje, erected by Denis Türje around 1234

One of his uncles (or cousins) was Joachim, the first known Count of Hermannstadt. His cousins (or first cousins once removed) were the influential prelate Philip and Thomas, progenitor of the Szentgróti family. Denis had no known descendants and died without male issue. A certain Denis the Bald from the same kindred is mentioned by a charter during a lawsuit from 1236. It is possible this family member is identical with the powerful baron (the Big-nosed). Virág Varga, however, rejected this identification between the two persons.

Prior to 1234, Denis Türje founded a Premonstratensian provostry in Türje dedicated to Blessed Virgin Mary. Belonging to the Diocese of Veszprém, he invited canons regular from the abbey of Csorna. Soon, the Türje Abbey became an important place of authentication. Denis' involvement in the foundation is not entirely clear. According to a later, 18th-century tradition within the Order of Premonstratensians, the provostry was established in 1184, which was previously even announced by an epigraph on the wall of the monastery and attributed the foundation a certain comes Lampert. A non-authentic letter of donation in the name of Béla IV refers to 1241 or 1242 as date of the foundation by Denis. According to the Catalogus Ninivensis, which contains a list of Premonstratensian churches in present-day Hungary and Transylvania (Circaria Hungariae) in 1234, the Provostry of Türje was already stood. Pope Alexander IV referred to Denis Türje as founder and benefactor of the monastery in 1260.

During and after the foundation, Denis handed over several landholdings of the Türje kindred to the newly erected monastery. For instance, in 1247, Denis donated the estates Barlabáshida (today a borough of Pakod), Vitenyéd (present-day Bagod), four portions, two mills and half of the river duty in Szentgrót to the provostry. He also granted the land Apatovec in Križevci County to the Premonstratensians in 1249. Some of his relatives followed his example with land donations. For instance, his sister (widow of a certain Ákos) handed over her estate in Batyk to the provostry in 1251. Following his death in 1255, some family members attempted to recover these estates citing that Denis donated those without their consent. The lawsuit lasted until 1322.

== Early life ==
Master of the horse Denis, son of Denis, who has been attached to us since Our childhood together, deservedly graced Us with his kind love and pleasant company; he followed Us everywhere in the realm and even outside the realm. [...] Ultimately passing the years of childhood, during which he grew up together with Us, when he reached his blooming youth, piling virtue upon virtue, he steadfastly stood by his long-vowed loyalty like a solid pillar, not failing to give countless signs of his persistence, in the light of which he often shone before the eyes of Our Majesty, ceaselessly and tirelessly. Admirably standing by Us in favorable and unfavorable circumstances, such as life in this world has in store, he did not shy away from exposing his property and person more and more often to the uncertain chances of fortune.

— King Béla's Charter of 1235 to Denis, Master of the Horse

Denis was born in the first decade of the 13th century, and himself was a childhood friend and companion of Duke Béla, who was born in 1206. They grew up together in the ducal court, which implies that Denis' father and his kindred had court influence during the early reign of Andrew II. Before launching the Fifth Crusade in 1217, Andrew II entrusted his eldest son and heir, the 11-year-old Béla to his brother-in-law Archbishop Berthold of Kalocsa, who took his nephew, Béla to the castle of Stahin, i.e. Steyr in the Duchy of Austria or Kamnik (Stein) in the March of Carniola. The young Denis of similar age accompanied Béla abroad. They returned to Hungary in the next year.

For the upcoming decades, Denis remained a strong pillar of Duke Béla's domain in Slavonia (1220–1226), then Transylvania (1226–1235). The duke had tense relationship with his father Andrew II, criticizing the king's reform economic policy called "new arrangements" and the large-scale grants of royal lands. In this context, Denis was politically committed to the duke, which also meant that he could not count on significant positions in the royal court until Béla's ascension to the Hungarian throne. Denis started his political career as royal servant ("reginal youth") of Béla's wife Maria Laskarina in the early 1220s.

== Early military career ==
The king's son [Andrew of Halych] and Sudislav summoned Dijaniš [Denis Türje] against Danilo [Romanovich]. But Danilo went to Kiev and brought the Polovcians [Cumans] [...] against him [...] and marched against Dijaniš. From [Halych] the king's son Andrew and Dijaniš with their Hungarians went to Peremil' and fought Volodimer [Vladimir IV Rurikovich] and Danilo for the possession of the bridge [leading to the city]. But [Danilo and Volodimer] repulsed them and the Hungarians turned back to Halych, leaving their catapults behind. [...] He [Danilo] distributed towns to his boyars and voyevodas, and they all had an abundance of food, while the king's son, Dijaniš, and Sudislav were dying of hunger in [Halych].

— Galician–Volhynian Chronicle (1233)

Denis distinguished himself militarily in various campaigns of Duke Béla in the period between 1228 and 1233. He belonged to the group of so-called "royal youth" (iuvenes aulae), who were already full-fledged warriors. His pre-1235 military career is narrated in detail by a single charter of Béla IV, who issued the document shortly after his ascension to the Hungarian throne in the autumn of 1235. Accordingly, Denis took part in various campaigns of Duke Béla, who initiated wars abroad, sometimes even independently of his father Andrew II. Béla invaded Bulgaria and besieged Vidin in 1228, because Emperor Ivan Asen II attempted to hinder the conversion of Cumans into Roman Catholicism in the northernmost part of his realm along the border with Hungary (the Bulgarian historiography claim the brief war occurred in the spring of 1232). According to the document, when the Bulgarians broke out of the castle, Denis was one of the first to fight them and the Hungarians forced them back into the fortress. Denis also fought against the army of Alexander, the younger brother of Ivan Asen, who plundered the surrounding region and tried to block the supply routes of the Hungarian army.

Danylo Romanovych launched a military campaign against Andrew of Hungary, Prince of Halych, expel him from the principality by March 1230. Béla decided to help his younger brother Andrew to regain his throne. He crossed the Carpathian Mountains and laid siege to Halych together with his Cuman allies in 1230 (the Galician–Volhynian Chronicle incorrectly put the year of attack to 1229). Denis fought alongside his lord. He was present at the siege of Halych, where he killed a soldier with a spear, who broke out from the castle, and later he defeated a small unit near the fort of Kremenets (Kuzmech). He captured a boyar and famous knight called Matthew. Thereafter, Denis led an army into Volhynia (Lodomeria), which successfully laid siege to the castle of Lutsk (Luchuchku). Nevertheless, Duke Béla could not seize Halych and withdrew his troops still in 1230. Ukrainian historian Mykhailo Hrushevsky claimed this narration referred to the 1226 royal campaign of Andrew II against Halych.

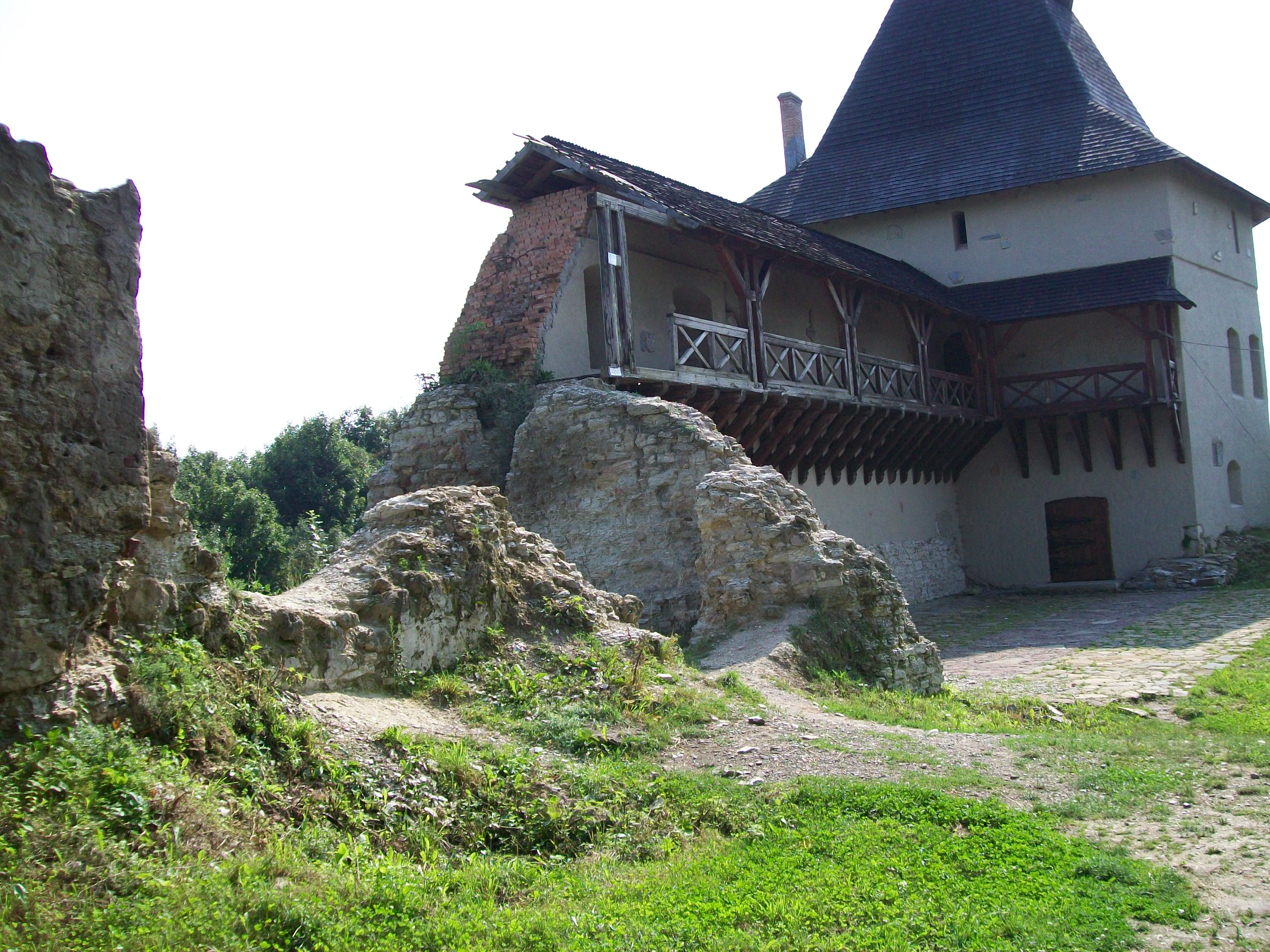
Ruins of the fortress of Halych

Shortly after succeeding his father as Duke of Austria, Frederick the Quarrelsome pillaged and raid the Austro-Hungarian borderland in 1230. Returning Hungary, Denis – whose landholdings laid in the region – was among those barons, who repelled the "German" incursion during an open battle along the border. Denis captured Hartnid von Pettau, the brother of Frederick IV, the lord of Pettau (today Ptuj, Slovenia). He presented the fettered prisoner in the ducal court of Béla. Austrian historian Hans Pirchegger placed the date of the conflict to the year 1233. In the second half of 1231, Andrew II and Béla jointly launched a war against Danylo Romanovych and invaded Halych in order to restore his youngest son, Andrew, to the Galician throne. Denis, who participated in the campaign, was seriously injured during the siege of Yaroslavl (present-day Jarosław, Poland), when stones fired from the castle hit him.

Duke Béla appointed Denis Türje as Voivode of Transylvania in 1233 (former historiography incorrectly attributed this position to Denis Tomaj). In this capacity, Denis escorted Béla to the forest of Bereg on 22 August 1233, where the duke and his prominent partisans, including Denis, swore to the agreement between Andrew II and the Holy See, took place two days before. By that time, both Andrew II and Béla prepared for another war against Halych in order to support the younger Andrew, who was embroiled in conflict with Vladimir IV Rurikovich, Grand Prince of Kiev and Danylo Romanovych. The prince requested reinforcements from Hungary. Because of the internal conflict with the church and Frederick of Austria's renewing raids in the western borderland hindered the royal family's active participation in Halych and they could send only a small relief army led by Denis Türje, which arrived to the province in the early autumn of 1233. However, the Hungarians were routed by Vladimir Rurikovich and his Cuman allies led by Köten near Peremil in Volhynia. Denis retreated to the fort of Halych with his remaining soldiers. Prince Andrew lost the support of boyars completely. Taking advantage of the situation, Danylo Romanovych seized all of Halych–Volhynia, excluding the capital Halych, which remained under Hungarian control. During a nine-week siege, the defenders were starved out and the Hungarian king was unable to launch another campaign due to the Austrian situation. According to the Galician–Volhynian Chronicle, Andrew of Halych starved to death at the very beginning of 1234, which closed the conflict and King Andrew II's series of attempts to seize Halych–Volhynia for the Hungarian Crown. Denis Türje survived the siege and was released from captivity shortly after. He returned to Hungary in that year. Japanese–Hungarian historian Toru Senga questioned the identification between Denis Türje and "Dijaniš" of the Galician–Volhynian Chronicle. Slovak historian Angelika Herucová considered the name refers to Denis Tomaj, who disappears from Hungarian sources from 1231 until late 1234 or early 1235. Denis Türje held the dignity of voivode at least until 1234.

== King Béla's faithful partisan ==
After Béla IV ascended the Hungarian throne in September 1235, Denis was made Master of the horse. He served in this capacity at least until September 1241. Beside that he also functioned as ispán (count) of the stablemen (Hungarian: lovászispán; Latin: comes agasonum) in 1235 and ispán of Temes County in 1240. For his loyalty and military service during Béla's ducal years, Denis was granted the lordship Tapolcsány (present-day Topoľčany, Slovakia) with the surrounding villages – Tavarnok (Tovarníky), Jalovec and Racsic (Račice, borough of Nitrica) in Nyitra County in 1235. With the donation, Denis became involved in a conflict of interest with the Knights Hospitaller of Esztergom, who claimed the property for themselves citing the last will of the previous owner Torda. The case was settled out of court; the knights were compensated with another estate from the late Torda's wealth, while Denis recovered and paid the dowry of 100 marks to the widow.

Denis Türje participated in the Battle of Mohi on 11 April 1241, when the advanced Mongols defeated the Hungarians. According to Thomas the Archdeacon's Historia Salonitana, Denis was among the accompaniment of Béla IV, who fled the battlefield and was pursued as far as the Dalmatian Coast. Around September 1241, Béla appointed him Ban of Slavonia (briefly also retaining the dignity of Master of the horse). Subsequently, he held the title of "Ban and Duke of Slavonia" (Latin: banus et dux totius Sclavonie) after 1242, later he also adopted the title "Ban of Maritime Provinces" (Croatian: Primorje, Hungarian: Tengermellék), which covered the area of Dalmatian coastal cities. He held the dignity at least until November 1244. According to a non-authentic charter he functioned as ban still in April 1245 too. Denis was the first non-royal Hungarian lord, who was styled with the title of "dux", when administered the province of Slavonia and Croatia. He was entrusted to protect the boundaries of the duchy, which was in a difficult situation after the death of Duke Coloman, according to a royal charter from 1242. In his letters to the coastal cities, Denis Türje styled himself "dei gracia dux et banus", imitating the royal addresses. It is plausible that his title of dux reflects his prominent military role and mandate in the province.

But after some eight or ten days had passed [after the Venetians laid siege to Zadar], it [the defenders' advantage] chanced that Ban Denys [Denis Türje] was lightly wounded by an arrow. The king [Béla IV] had sent him to help the people of Zadar as leader and standard-bearer of the army. He was terrified by his wound and ordered the soldiers to carry him outside the city. When the Zaratins saw this, fear and bewilderment overcame them. They thought that the ban was dead, and they had no confidence that they could resist the Venetian attack any further without the support of the Hungarians. Because of this, they immediately abandoned the fight, and turned to flight.

— Thomas the Archdeacon: History of the Bishops of Salona and Split

For the following years, Denis Türje became a central figure of Béla's Dalmatian policy. The Hungarian king seized Zadar (or Zara) from the Republic of Venice in 1242. In response, the Venetians launched a campaign and laid siege to the coastal city in 1243, prompting Béla to send Denis to provide assistance to the citizens of Zadar. The Hungarians were unable to relieve the defenders and Denis himself was also injured by an arrow. The citizens of Zadar surrendered and fled before the fleet of Venice. In January 1244, Hungary and Venice concluded a peace. Béla surrendered his supremacy over the city, while the Venetians withdrew their support from the pretender Stephen the Posthumous. The Hungarians retained the one third of the Dalmatian city's revenues of customs.

[...] they [Trogir] sent an embassy to the king [Béla IV] relating to him the whole story of what had been done in their lands by the ban [Matej Ninoslav] in company with the Spalatins [Split]. The king was extremely angry when he heard all this. He immediately summoned a duke of his by the name of Denys [Denis Türje] a powerful man who was ban of all Slavonia and Dalmatia, and sent him together with Bartholomew [le Gros] the bishop of the church of Pécs, a certain Count Michael [Hahót] and many other leading men of Hungary, commanding them strictly that on coming to Dalmatia they should exact harsh retribution on the Spalatins, using all means possible. He also sent another army to avenge the reckless acts of the ban of Bosnia. [...] Indeed, not fully two weeks had elapsed before Duke Denys descended in company with the aforementioned leaders, and having gathered together a large army of Hungarians, Dalmatians and Slavs he came and set up camp at Solin. [...] In the year of our Lord 1244, on the fourth day before the Ides of July a great battle took place in the suburb of Split, and the entire army arrayed in battle order began the fight around the earthworks.

— Thomas the Archdeacon: History of the Bishops of Salona and Split

Denis was also involved in the conflict between the cities Trogir (Trau) and Split (Spalato). Béla, who took refugee in the well-fortified Trogir during the Mongol invasion, was grateful to the city, granted it lands near Split, causing a lasting conflict between the two Dalmatian cities. The citizens of Split elected Matej Ninoslav as their prince. Split launched an attack from the Adriatic Sea then mainland in the spring of 1244, but they could not take Trogir, they only destroyed the surrounding countryside. Béla was outraged by the action, and – after a request from the patricians of Trogir – entrusted Denis to lead an army against Split, while himself prepared for a war against Ninoslav in Bosnia. Within Denis' army, other prominent Hungarian barons and prelates – Bartholomew le Gros, the Bishop of Pécs, Michael Hahót, the ispán of Varaždin County and File Miskolc, the provost of Zagreb commanded their own troops. According to Thomas the Archdeacon, the citizens of Split sent a peace delegation before the arriving army. Denis would have been willing to abandon the siege in exchange for guarantors and sum of money, but the citizens emphasized their royal privileges. Denis' army, also strengthened by the troops of the Fortress of Klis, set about the siege on 12 July 1244. Following a week-long clash inside the walls of Split, the prefects of the city asked for peace from Denis Türje on 19 July. In accordance with the peace conditions, the citizens and the cathedral chapter swore loyalty to the Hungarian king, and reparations were paid for the damages. Shortly after Ugrin Csák was elected Archbishop of Split.

== Last years ==
In 1245, Denis – at the height of his career – was appointed Palatine of Hungary, the second-highest secular office after the king and held the position until 1246. Beside that he also functioned as ispán of Somogy County. As palatine, Denis judged over lawsuits in Szántó in Zala County and Ládony in Sopron County. He served as master of the treasury in 1247, according to László Markó, he held that office between 1246 and 1248. In addition, he also functioned as ispán of Pozsony County from 1247 to 1248. He was appointed palatine for the second time in 1248. Two of his judgments have survived: lawsuits involved Szántó in Zala County and Karcsa in Pozsony County (today Kračany, Slovakia).

Since the early 1240s, Denis further increased his wealth, acquiring possessions. For his services during the Mongol invasion and the subsequent Dalmatian years, Denis was granted Obrovnica (Orbona), Haraszt and Cerova-Borda (near present-day Marinovec) in Križevci County from Béla IV in 1244. He bought Barlabáshida in Zala County for 40 silver marks in 1246 (a year later, Denis donated the land to the Türje monastery). Denis was also an owner of two lands – Csoma and Gortva – in Gömör County. Since the second half of the 1240s, Denis held his permanent residence in Szentgrót. It is plausible that Denis or his cousin Thomas erected the local fort.

Denis served as ispán of Szolnok County between 1251 and 1255, until his death. Beside the position, Béla donated the village Bonyha (today Bahnea, Romania) to Denis. He also acquired the estate Püspöki along the river Tisza during his tenure as ispán. He last appears as a living person in February 1255, when he resided in Radkersburg in the Duchy of Styria (which was then under Hungarian rule) and acted as a co-judge beside Roland Rátót. Another charter from the same year refers to Denis as a deceased person. Denis Türje was buried in the Premonstratensian provostry of Türje, founded by himself, near its altar. His original grave site was excavated by archaeologists during renovation works of the church in the period between 2018 and 2020. Unfortunately, no trace of his remains has been found, as subsequent burials occurred on top of the grave in the 18th century.

== Sources ==
=== Primary sources ===
- The Hypatian Codex II: The Galician-Volynian Chronicle (An annotated translation by George A. Perfecky) (1973). Wilhelm Fink Verlag. LCCN 72-79463.
- Archdeacon Thomas of Split: History of the Bishops of Salona and Split (Latin text by Olga Perić, edited, translated and annotated by Damir Karbić, Mirjana Matijević Sokol and James Ross Sweeney) (2006). CEU Press. ISBN 963-7326-59-6.

=== Secondary sources ===
- Cselenkó, Borbála (2006). Szerzetesrendek az Árpád-kori Zala megyében [Monasteries in Zala County of the Era of the Árpáds] (in Hungarian). Zalai Kismonográfiák 9., Zala Megyei Múzeumok Igazgatósága. ISBN 963-7205-43-8.
- Engel, Pál (1996). Magyarország világi archontológiája, 1301–1457, I. [Secular Archontology of Hungary, 1301–1457, Volume I] (in Hungarian). História, MTA Történettudományi Intézete. ISBN 963-8312-44-0.
- F. Romhányi, Beatrix (2000). Kolostorok és társaskáptalanok a középkori Magyarországon: Katalógus [Monasteries and Collegiate Chapters in Medieval Hungary: A Catalogue] (in Hungarian). Pytheas. ISBN 963-7483-07-1.
- Font, Márta (2021). The Kings of the House of Árpád and the Rurikid Princes. Cooperation and conflict in medieval Hungary and Kievan Rus'. Arpadiana VIII., Research Centre for the Humanities. ISBN 978-963-416-278-0.
- Gál, Judit (2020). Dalmatia and the Exercise of Royal Authority in the Árpád-Era Kingdom of Hungary. Arpadiana III., Research Centre for the Humanities. ISBN 978-963-416-227-8.
- Herucová, Angelika (2016). "Dionýz de Türje ‒ priateľ a spolubojovník Bela IV. [Denis Türje: A Friend and Comrade-in-arms of Béla IV]". In Dzurikaninová, Nikoleta (ed.). Vojenksé konflikty v dejinách Európy. Stretnutie mladých historikov V (in Slovak). Pavol Jozef Šafárik University. pp. 36–48. ISBN 978-80-8152-402-8.
- Karácsonyi, János (1901). A magyar nemzetségek a XIV. század közepéig. III. kötet [The Hungarian genera until the middle of the 14th century, Vol. 3] (in Hungarian). Hungarian Academy of Sciences.
- Kristó, Gyula (1979). A feudális széttagolódás Magyarországon [Feudal Anarchy in Hungary] (in Hungarian). Akadémiai Kiadó. ISBN 963-05-1595-4.
- Kristó, Gyula, ed. (2000). Középkori históriák oklevelekben (1002–1410) [Medieval Stories in Charters (1002–1410)] (in Hungarian). Szegedi Középkorász Műhely. ISBN 963-482-423-4.
- Markó, László (2006). A magyar állam főméltóságai Szent Istvántól napjainkig: Életrajzi Lexikon [Great Officers of State in Hungary from King Saint Stephen to Our Days: A Biographical Encyclopedia] (in Hungarian). Helikon Kiadó. ISBN 963-208-970-7.
- Senga, Toru (1988). "Béla királyfi bolgár, halicsi és osztrák hadjárataihoz [On the Military Campaigns of Prince Béla led to Bulgaria, Galicia and Austria]". Századok (in Hungarian). 122 (1–2). Magyar Történelmi Társulat: 36–51. ISSN 0039-8098.
- Szőcs, Tibor (2014). A nádori intézmény korai története, 1000–1342 [An Early History of the Palatinal Institution: 1000–1342] (in Hungarian). Magyar Tudományos Akadémia Támogatott Kutatások Irodája. ISBN 978-963-508-697-9.
- Varga, Virág (2026). "IV. Béla egy hű bárója: Türje nembeli Szentgróti Dénes pályafutása [A Loyal Baron of King Béla IV: The Carrier of Denis of Szentgrót of the Türje Kindred]". Belvedere Meridionale (in Hungarian). 38 (2): 62–84. doi:10.14232/belv.2026.2.3. ISSN 1419-0222.
- Zsoldos, Attila (2005). Az Árpádok és asszonyaik. A királynéi intézmény az Árpádok korában [The Árpáds and their Women: The Institution of Queenship in the Era of the Árpáds] (in Hungarian). MTA Történettudományi Intézete. ISBN 963-8312-98-X.
- Zsoldos, Attila (2011). Magyarország világi archontológiája, 1000–1301 [Secular Archontology of Hungary, 1000–1301] (in Hungarian). História, MTA Történettudományi Intézete. ISBN 978-963-9627-38-3.

Denis II Genus Türje Born: 1200s Died: 1255
Political offices
Preceded by Julius Rátót	Voivode of Transylvania; 1233–1234	Succeeded by Andrew, son of Serafin
Preceded by Alexander Hont-Pázmány	Master of the horse 1235–1241	Succeeded by William of Saint Omer
Preceded by Nicholas Gutkeled	Ban of Slavonia; 1241–1244/5	Succeeded by Ladislaus Kán
Preceded by Ladislaus Kán	Palatine of Hungary; 1245–1246	Succeeded by Stephen Gutkeled
Preceded by Osl Osl	Master of the treasury 1247	Succeeded by Csák Hahót
Preceded by Stephen Gutkeled	Palatine of Hungary; 1248	Succeeded by Roland Rátót
