= Pousa Türje =

Hungarian cleric

- Provost of Veszprém
- Installed: 1312
- Term ended: 1323
- Predecessor: Stephen Kéki
- Successor: John
- Other post: Archdeacon of Zala

Personal details
- Died: 1323 or 1324
- Denomination: Roman Catholic
- Parents: Pousa I Türje

Pousa (II) from the kindred Türje (Hungarian: Türje nembeli (II.) Pósa; died 1323 or 1324) was a Hungarian cleric at the turn of the 13th and 14th centuries, who served as Provost of Veszprém from 1312 until his death.

== Family ==
Pousa (II) was born into the Bér branch of the gens (clan) Türje, which originated from Zala County and possessed landholdings mostly in Transdanubia. His father was Pousa (I), who held his permanent residence in Bér. He had three brothers, Nicholas, John and Mark. The latter two were ancestors of the Béri and Orbonai noble families, respectively.

== Career ==
Pousa entered ecclesiastical career. His name first appears in contemporary records in 1281, when he agreed to sell Dabronc, along with several other members of the kindred. Pousa served as archdeacon of Zala from 1299 to 1306. Together with his two living brothers, John and Mark, he took part in the division process of the clan's estates with the Szentgrót branch of the gens Türje in 1299. Accordingly, Pousa and his brothers were granted most of the lands laid beyond the Drava, including Orbona (Vrbona; near present-day Obrovnica, Croatia) and Cerova-Brda (Zalaburda), in addition to the estates Bér, Batyk and Hídvég in Zala County, and Püspöki along the river Tisza in Szolnok County. Initially, Pousa also laid claim to the portion in Türje once possessed by the late Denis (III), who had earlier violent conflicts with the clan's Bér branch over the boundaries of the ancestral seat. Pousa eventually relinquished this claim in favor of the orphan Desiderius (I), son of Denis. In 1306, Pousa and his brothers, among others, agreed to let their relative Peregrine (I) donate the lands Barlabáshida (present-day a borough of Pakod) and Vitenyéd (present-day a borough of Bagod) in Zala County to the clan's monastery, the Premonstratensian church of Türje.

Pousa served as Provost of Veszprém at least from 1312 to 1323. He died sometime between December 1323 and September 1324.

== Sources ==
- Karlinszky, Balázs (2014). "A veszprémi nagyprépostok archontológiája, 1079–1543 – Három prépost portréjával [Archontology of the Grand Provosts of Veszprém, 1079–1543 – With Portraits of Three Provosts]". Turul (in Hungarian). 87 (3). Magyar Heraldikai és Genealógiai Társaság: 93–103. ISSN 1216-7258.
- Varga, Virág (2024). "A Türje nembeli Szentgrótiak a 13. században és a 14. század első felében [The Szentgróti Family of the Türje Kindred in the 13th Century and the First Half of 14th Century]". In Hunyadi, Sándor; et al. (eds.). Micae Mediaevales XIII (in Hungarian). Eötvös Loránd University. pp. 121–149. ISSN 2062-2198.

Pousa II Genus Türje Born: ? Died: 1323 or 1324
Catholic Church titles
| Preceded by Stephen Kéki | Provost of Veszprém; 1312–1323 | Succeeded by John |
