= Philip Szentgróti =

Ispán of Vas
- Reign: 1274–1275
- Predecessor: Gregory Monoszló
- Successor: Herrand Héder
- Died: after 1335
- Noble family: House of Szentgróti
- Spouses: 1, unknown 2, Clara, daughter of Werner
- Issue: (1) Nicholas I (1) Desiderius (1) Ladislaus I (2) Nicholas II
- Father: Thomas Türje

Philip Szentgróti (Hungarian: Szentgróti Fülöp; died after 1335) was a Hungarian nobleman in the 13–14th centuries, who was founder of the Szentgróti family. He served as ispán of Győr County in 1272 and as ispán of Vas County from 1274 to 1275.

== Family ==
Philip (II) was born into the Szentgrót branch of the gens (clan) Türje, which originated from Zala County. He was the second son of Thomas (I) and his unidentified wife. He had two brothers, Denis (III) – who served as Chancellor of the Cupbearers in 1270 – and Thomas (II).

Philip and his first unidentified wife had three sons – Nicholas (I), Desiderius and Ladislaus (I). Prior to 1323, the elderly Philip married Clara, who came from a bourgeois family. Both her father Werner and brother Ladislaus served as rectors of Buda. Her first husband was Julius (III) Rátót, who died sometime between 1315 and 1317. The marriage of Philip and Clara produced a son Nicholas (II), who became provost of Eger by 1346. Historian Pál Engel incorrectly referred to him as Michael. The Szentgróti family which flourished until the late 15th century, descended from Nicholas (I) and Ladislaus.

== Career ==
The young Philip entered court service upon the courtesy of his father Thomas and his uncle Philip Türje, who was Archbishop of Esztergom. Philip first appears in contemporary records in September 1270, when the newly crowned Stephen V of Hungary confirmed and transcribed his father's donation of letter regarding Prodaviz in Križevci County (present-day Virje, Croatia) and its tax privileges to Philip and his brothers, i.e. the three sons of the late Thomas (I). During the early reign of the minor Ladislaus IV of Hungary, Philip was styled as ispán of Győr County by a single royal charter in November 1272. He served as ispán of Vas County from the autumn of 1274 to the spring of 1275; however this position was highly nominal because the powerful Kőszegi family established a de facto sovereign oligarchic province there over the county by that time. As a confidant of the Csák baronial group and a member of their local opposition in Western Transdanubia, Philip was appointed to administer the county following the death of Henry I Kőszegi and the temporary regression of his kinship after the death of Battle of Föveny. He was replaced as ispán by Herrand Héder in May 1273 at the latest, who was another confidant of the Csáks. A non-authentic royal charter with the date 1275 refers to Philip as count (head) of the queenly court of Isabella of Sicily, Ladislaus' consort.

From the second half of the 1270s onwards, Philip was eliminated from the Hungarian elite after the death of his powerful kin and due to the anarchy that increasingly dominated the kingdom, through which the powerful oligarchic families continued to expand their authority. In Transdanubia, the Kőszegis established a coherent province throughout the decades. Prior to 1279, Philip and his brothers concluded a property distribution agreement with their relative Pousa (I) from the clan's Bér branch, who thus acquired the clan's lands beyond the Drava, while Denis, Philip and Thomas retained the possessions in Zala County. The Türje clan was driven out from Upper Hungary by the late 1270s; Matthew II Csák acquired the lordship Tapolcsány (present-day Topoľčany, Slovakia) with the surrounding villages from Philip and his brothers. Following the death of his elder brother Denis, Philip became head of the family's Szentgrót branch. Along with his brother Thomas and nephew Desiderius, he agreed to sell Dabronc in 1281. The fort of Szentgrót in Zala County, erected possibly by their father Thomas, became permanent residence of the emerging Szentgróti family.

The members of the Türje kindred divided their possessions among themselves for the second time in 1299. The Szentgrót branch, consisted of Philip, Thomas (II) and Desiderius (I), reached an agreement with the clan's Bér branch. Given their very close kinship, the parties forgave each other for all hostility, strife, murder, destruction, arson, robbery and other injustices. The document narrates that Philip and Thomas unlawfully seized Batyk in Zala County, despite the first division agreement and against the will of the sons of the late Pousa (I). In accordance with the 1299 treaty, Philip and his branch were granted the castle of Szentgrót with its four villages Szentgrót, Zsid, Bárba and Udvarnok (present-day boroughs of Zalaszentgrót). In 1306, Philip, together with his brother Thomas and nephew Desiderius, agreed to let their relative Peregrine (I) donate the lands Barlabáshida (present-day a borough of Pakod) and Vitenyéd (present-day a borough of Bagod) in Zala County to the clan's monastery, the Premonstratensian church of Türje.

By the beginning of the 14th century, Philip was either forced to enter or voluntarily joined the service of Matthew III Csák, the most prominent oligarch during the era of interregnum, becoming his familiaris. Historian Gyula Kristó considered that Philip was forced to swear loyalty, when Matthew Csák expanded his influence over Nógrád and Gömör counties around 1308 or 1309. In contrast, Virág Varga argued the Csáks had already extended their authority to the members of the family decades earlier, and Philip served them at least since the early 1280s. He represented his lord in the national diet in November 1308, where Charles of Anjou was elected and proclaimed king of Hungary. On behalf of Matthew Csák, he also attended the second coronation of Charles I on 15 June 1309 in Buda. Philip possessed Vígvár (present-day Veselé, Slovakia) which Matthew Csák perhaps bestowed upon him for his services.

Sometime in the second half of the 1310s, Philip left the allegiance of Matthew Csák and swore loyalty to Charles I who then waged war against the oligarchic domains. Perhaps this covenant was sealed by his marriage with Clara, whose brother rector Ladislaus was a strong confidant of the king. Thereafter, his sons – Nicholas (I) and Ladislaus (I) – served in the royal court; the former entered the service of Nicholas Hahót, Ban of Slavonia while the latter was a courtly knight. Philip is last mentioned as a living person in March 1335, when he and his three elder sons donated the estate Besenyő in Somogy County (present-day Balatonszentgyörgy) to the Türje monastery.

== Sources ==
- Karácsonyi, János (1900). A magyar nemzetségek a XIV. század közepéig. [The Hungarian genera until the middle of the 14th century] (in Hungarian). Hungarian Academy of Sciences.
- Varga, Virág (2024). "A Türje nembeli Szentgrótiak a 13. században és a 14. század első felében [The Szentgróti Family of the Türje Kindred in the 13th Century and the First Half of 14th Century]". In Hunyadi, Sándor; et al. (eds.). Micae Mediaevales XIII (in Hungarian). Eötvös Loránd University. pp. 121–149. ISSN 2062-2198.
- Zsoldos, Attila (2011). Magyarország világi archontológiája, 1000–1301 [Secular Archontology of Hungary, 1000–1301] (in Hungarian). História, MTA Történettudományi Intézete. ISBN 978-963-9627-38-3.

Philip House of Szentgróti Born: ? Died: after 1335
Political offices
Preceded by Selke	Ispán of Győr; 1272	Succeeded by James Bána
Preceded by Gregory Monoszló	Ispán of Vas; 1274–1275	Succeeded by Herrand Héder
