= Thomas Türje =

Thomas (I) Türje

Ispán of Karakó
- Reign: 1250–1263
- Predecessor: Sal Atyusz (1205)
- Successor: Amadeus Aba (1299)
- Born: 1210s
- Died: 1267/1270
- Noble family: gens Türje
- Issue: Denis III; Philip II; Thomas II
- Father: Joachim

Thomas (I) from the kindred Türje (Hungarian: Türje nembeli (I.) Tamás; died after 1267) was a Hungarian nobleman and soldier in the 13th century, who served as ispán of Karakó ispánate from 1250 to 1263.

== Family ==
Thomas was born in the early 1210s into the gens (clan) Türje, which originated from Zala County. His father was Joachim, a skilled military general of King Andrew II of Hungary. He had a brother Philip (I), who entered ecclesiastical career and served as Archbishop of Esztergom from 1262 to 1272. Their unidentified sister married Demetrius Zselizi, a nobleman from Bars County.

Thomas had three sons from his marriage with an unidentified noblewoman: Denis (III), Philip (II) and Thomas (II). The Szentgróti family, which flourished until the late 15th century, ascended from Philip, who married Clara, the daughter of Werner, rector of Buda.

== Career ==
As a young nobleman, Thomas initially belonged to the household of Coloman, Duke of Slavonia, who was the younger brother of King Béla IV of Hungary. Under the banner of the duke, Thomas fought against the invading Mongols in the Battle of Mohi on 11 April 1241, where he was seriously injured in his right arm and could barely escape after the defeat. When the Mongols pursued the fleeing King Béla IV, Thomas' estates in Transdanubia along their route were plundered and destroyed. His lord Coloman died of his wounds in May 1241. Thereafter, Thomas entered the service of his relative Denis Türje, who was made Ban of Slavonia and was sent to Dalmatia to restore royal power there after the withdrawal of the Mongols. In this capacity, Thomas fought against the Venetians during the siege of Zadar in 1243.

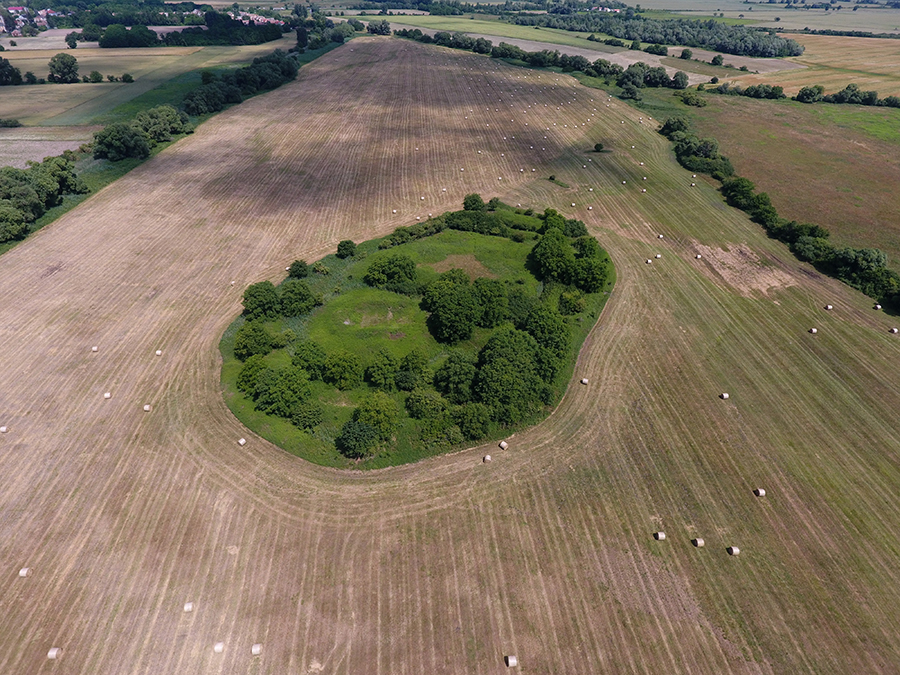
The ruins of the royal castle of Karakó

For their merits and faithful royal service, Béla IV returned the land Slanje in Zala County (present-day in Croatia) to Philip and Thomas in 1248. Formerly, the land was granted to their late father Joachim by Andrew II, but later this royal donation was overturned at the beginning of Béla's reign in 1236–1237. Béla IV renewed his father's charter regarding the land donation of Slanje to the Türje brothers in June 1250. Béla also entrusted Felician, the provost of Kalocsa to determine the estate's borders. By that time, Thomas was made ispán of the royal castle district of Karakó located in Vas County. Karakó lay northeast of Türje, the ancestral seat of his kindred, thus Thomas, during his active years, did not remain in Slavonia, but rather stayed on the family estates around Türje in Zala County, and he administered the Karakó ispánate from there. Thomas held the dignity at least until August 1263.

He was only styled as comes Thomas in July 1267, when Béla IV donated the land Prodaviz in Križevci County (present-day Virje, Croatia) to him, with the consent of Queen Maria Laskarina and their son Béla, Duke of Slavonia. Béla IV also exempted the land from paying all taxes (including marturina) and burdens. Prior to that, the king confiscated the aforementioned estate from Styrian ministerialis Conrad von Treun for his betrayal. Under unclear circumstances, Thomas' right of ownership over Prodaviz was questioned during the time of Duke Béla, but he or his sons recovered the estate after the duke's death in 1269. Thomas died sometime between 1267 and 1270; in September of the latter year, the new monarch Stephen V of Hungary confirmed and transcribed his father's donation of letter regarding Prodaviz and its tax privileges to Thomas' three sons.

== Sources ==
- Karácsonyi, János (1900). A magyar nemzetségek a XIV. század közepéig. [The Hungarian genera until the middle of the 14th century] (in Hungarian). Hungarian Academy of Sciences.
- Varga, Virág (2024). "A Türje nembeli Szentgrótiak a 13. században és a 14. század első felében [The Szentgróti Family of the Türje Kindred in the 13th Century and the First Half of 14th Century]". In Hunyadi, Sándor; et al. (eds.). Micae Mediaevales XIII (in Hungarian). Eötvös Loránd University. pp. 121–149. ISSN 2062-2198.
- Zsoldos, Attila (2011). Magyarország világi archontológiája, 1000–1301 [Secular Archontology of Hungary, 1000–1301] (in Hungarian). História, MTA Történettudományi Intézete. ISBN 978-963-9627-38-3.

Thomas I Genus Türje Born: ? Died: after 1267
Political offices
Preceded by Sal Atyusz (?)	Ispán of Karakó; 1250–1263	Succeeded by Amadeus Aba (?)
