= Gecse Türje =

Gecse (II) Türje

Ispán of Zala
- Reign: 1225
- Predecessor: Solomon Atyusz
- Successor: Nicholas Gutkeled
- Died: after 1240
- Noble family: gens Türje
- Issue: Pousa I Gecse III
- Father: Gecse I

Gecse (II) from the kindred Türje (Hungarian: Türje nembeli (II.) Gecse; died after 1240) was a Hungarian nobleman in the first half of the 13th century, who served as ispán of Zala County in 1225 and as ispán of Bars County from 1236 to 1240.

== Family ==
Gecse (II) was born into the gens (clan) Türje, which originated from Zala County. His father Gecse (I). His elder brother was the skilled military general Joachim. From his marriage with an unidentified noblewoman, Gecse had two sons, Pousa (I) and Gecse (III). Through Pousa, Gecse (II) was progenitor of the Béri (later Zalabéri) and Orbonai noble families.

== Career ==
Similarly to other members of the kindred, Gecse entered the service of the young duke Béla, the eldest son and heir of King Andrew II of Hungary. Gecse was styled as ispán of Zala County in 1225, which then belonged to the realm of Béla, who was Duke of Slavonia during that time. When Andrew II transferred his son to the dukedom of Transylvania, Gecse left his court and remained in Transdanubia.

After Béla IV ascended the Hungarian throne, Gecse administered Bars County at least from 1236 to 1240. As a local nobleman in Zala County, he acted as a testifier in a lawsuit over Szántó in 1236. It is possible he acquired several landholdings in Bars County during his term as ispán, due to the future properties of his kindred there. Béla IV donated the villages Csoma and Gortva in Gömör County (present-day Čamovce and Gortva in Slovakia, respectively) to Gecse in 1240, after the monarch confiscated both landholdings from Bánk Bár-Kalán. Gecse's cousin Denis Türje was a neighbor of both villages.

== Sources ==
- Karácsonyi, János (1900). A magyar nemzetségek a XIV. század közepéig. [The Hungarian genera until the middle of the 14th century] (in Hungarian). Hungarian Academy of Sciences.
- Varga, Virág (2024). "A Türje nembeli Szentgrótiak a 13. században és a 14. század első felében [The Szentgróti Family of the Türje Kindred in the 13th Century and the First Half of 14th Century]". In Hunyadi, Sándor; et al. (eds.). Micae Mediaevales XIII (in Hungarian). Eötvös Loránd University. pp. 121–149. ISSN 2062-2198.
- Zsoldos, Attila (2011). Magyarország világi archontológiája, 1000–1301 [Secular Archontology of Hungary, 1000–1301] (in Hungarian). História, MTA Történettudományi Intézete. ISBN 978-963-9627-38-3.
- Zsoldos, Attila (2022). Az Aranybulla királya [The King of the Golden Bull] (in Hungarian). Városi Levéltár és Kutatóintézet. ISBN 978-963-8406-26-2.

Gecse II Genus Türje Born: ? Died: after 1240
Political offices
Preceded by Solomon Atyusz	Ispán of Zala; 1225	Succeeded by Nicholas Gutkeled
Preceded by Lucas Péc	Ispán of Bars; 1236–1240	Succeeded by Werner
