= Joachim Türje =

Hungarian nobleman and soldier

Count of Hermannstadt
- Reign: c. 1210
- Predecessor: first known
- Successor: Dominic Csák (in 1266)
- Noble family: gens Türje
- Issue: Thomas; Philip a daughter
- Father: Gecse I

Joachim from the kindred Türje (Hungarian: Türje nembeli Joachim, also Ivachin or Iwachin) was a Hungarian nobleman and soldier in the first half of the 13th century. He served as the first known Count of Hermannstadt around 1210. Joachim was the forefather of the Szentgróti noble family.

== Family ==
Joachim was born into the illustrious gens Türje, which originated from Zala County. His father Gecse I, was the first known member of the kindred. He had at least three siblings: Denis I, the father of the powerful baron Denis II, Gecse II, who served as ispán of Zala (1225) and Bars counties (1236–1240). An unidentified sister was also mentioned in 1251, when she was widow of a deceased male member of the gens Ákos. Joachim had two sons from his unidentified wife: Thomas participated in the Battle of Mohi, and later functioned as the ispán of Karakó ispánate. The Szentgróti family descended from him. Joachim's younger son was Philip, an influential prelate in the second half of the 13th century, who served as Bishop of Zagreb from 1247 or 1248 to 1262, and as Archbishop of Esztergom from 1262 until his death, and was a strong confidant of the Hungarian royal family. Joachim also had a daughter, who married Demetrius Zselizi.

== Military career ==
Joachim was a faithful soldier of Andrew II of Hungary. Around 1210, he served as the first known Count of Hermannstadt (or Szeben; Hungarian: szebeni ispán), and in this capacity, he was the head of the Transylvanian Saxons living in the wider region of Hermannstadt (now Sibiu in Romania). When an uprising broke out in Vidin against Boril of Bulgaria in that year, the Bulgarian ruler was unable to suppress the rebellion without external assistance and turned to Andrew II, reminding him "their reliable friendship". In response, the Hungarian king sent Joachim to lead an army of Saxons, Vlachs, Székelys and Pechenegs across the Carpathian Mountains to fight for Boril of Bulgaria against three rebellious Cuman chieftains, according to a royal charter issued in 1250. The record suggests that the four ethnic groups were subjected to the Counts of Hermannstadt in the early 13th century. Joachim first routed the three Cuman chieftains who tried to halt his invasion, killing two of them in the battlefield, while the third one Karas was captured and sent to the Hungarian royal court as a prisoner. Following that Joachim's army marched along the Danube to Vidin, and besieged the castle. According to the 1250 charter, the Hungarian troops set fire to two gates of the fort and "fought valiantly". Joachim himself was gravely wounded in the skirmish, but Vidin was successfully captured and was given back to Boril, suppressing the rebellion against him. Joachim's four relatives were killed during the campaign. There is no consensus in historiography regarding the date of the uprising against Boril and Joachim's campaign, took place sometime between 1210 and 1214.

For his military service and merits, Joachim was granted lands in Slanje (today in Croatia) and Varaždin County. Four decades later, Béla IV of Hungary issued a royal charter in Győr on 23 June 1250, which became the only source of information on Joachim's military campaign. In the document, the king confirmed Thomas and Philip, the sons of the late Joachim, in their inherited paternal land possessions, describing the merits of the three members of the Türje kindred. Joachim also participated in Andrew's military campaign against the Principality of Galicia in 1211. He acted as a pristaldus (royal commissioner or "bailiff") in 1214, when comes Nicholas was inducted into the ownership of the land of Lendva (present-day Lendava, Slovenia).

== Sources ==
- Karácsonyi, János (1901). A magyar nemzetségek a XIV. század közepéig. III. kötet [The Hungarian genera until the middle of the 14th century, Vol. 3] (in Hungarian). Hungarian Academy of Sciences.
- Varga, Virág (2024). "A Türje nembeli Szentgrótiak a 13. században és a 14. század első felében [The Szentgróti Family of the Türje Kindred in the 13th Century and the First Half of 14th Century]". In Hunyadi, Sándor; et al. (eds.). Micae Mediaevales XIII (in Hungarian). Eötvös Loránd University. pp. 121–149. ISSN 2062-2198.
- Vásáry, István (2005). Cumans and Tatars: Oriental Military in the Pre-Ottoman Balkans, 1185–1365. Cambridge University Press. ISBN 0-521-83756-1.
- Zsoldos, Attila (2011). Magyarország világi archontológiája, 1000–1301 [Secular Archontology of Hungary, 1000–1301] (in Hungarian). História, MTA Történettudományi Intézete. ISBN 978-963-9627-38-3.

Joachim Genus Türje Born: ? Died: ?
Political offices
Preceded by first known	Count of Hermannstadt; 1210	Succeeded by Dominic Csák (1266)
