= Philip Türje =

Hungarian prelate

- Archbishop of Esztergom
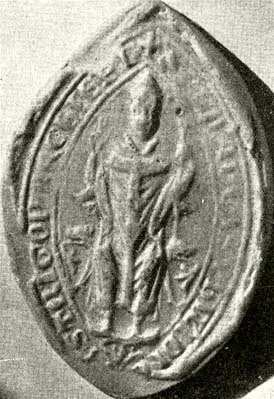
- Seal of Archbishop Philip, 1272
- Installed: 1262
- Term ended: 18 December 1272
- Predecessor: Benedict
- Successor: Nicholas Kán elected
- Other post: Bishop of Zagreb

Personal details
- Born: c. 1218
- Died: 18 December 1272
- Denomination: Roman Catholic
- Parents: Joachim Türje

Philip from the kindred Türje (Hungarian: Türje nembeli Fülöp, Croatian: Filip; c. 1218 – 18 December 1272), also known as, albeit incorrectly, Philip of Szentgrót (Hungarian: Szentgróti Fülöp) was a Hungarian prelate in the 13th century, who served as Bishop of Zagreb from 1247 or 1248 to 1262, and as Archbishop of Esztergom from 1262 until his death.

== Early life ==
Philip was born around 1218 and raised in the royal court. He belonged to the influential gens (clan) Türje, which originated from Zala County. His father was Joachim (or Ivachin), who functioned as Count of Hermannstadt around 1210. In this capacity, he commanded an army of Saxons, Vlachs, Székelys and Pechenegs to assist Boril of Bulgaria's fight against three rebellious Cuman chieftains in that year. Philip's cousin was the powerful baron and soldier Denis Türje, Palatine of Hungary in the 1240s. Philip had a brother Thomas, the ispán of Karakó ispánate and forefather of the Szentgróti family. He also had an unidentified sister, who married Demetrius Zselizi. Under the courtesy of Philip, his two nephews, Joachim and Seraphin attended the University of Bologna in 1269. Seraphin later served as provost of Pressburg from 1294 to 1311.

As a canon of Veszprém, Philip attended the University of Padua. In July 1241, he was mentioned among Roman law students. As a young novice, Philip fled together with king Béla IV and the royal court to the Dalmatian coast after the disastrous Battle of Mohi and stayed there until the withdrawal of the Mongols from Hungary in 1242. He was first referred as provost of Dömös in 1246. Additionally, he also functioned as chancellor and confessor for Queen consort Maria Laskarina, holding both offices until 1248. As chancellor, he participated in reparcelling process of lands beyond the Drava. He also judged in favour of the Bakonybél Abbey during a lawsuit, when refused to recognize the social status of abbey's servants as church serfs and maintained their status of udvornici. The narration of a 1250 royal charter recounts that Philip was already commissioned to take part in a diplomatic mission to the Kingdom of Bohemia, when he was provost. Historian Veronika Rudolf considered that it occurred in 1237 when Béla IV, through Philip, mediated between Wenceslaus I of Bohemia and his rebellious brother Přemysl, Margrave of Moravia. Philip also escorted Béla's daughter Elizabeth to the Duchy of Bavaria in about 1244, where she later married to Henry XIII, Duke of Bavaria.

== Bishop of Zagreb ==
Philip was elected Bishop of Zagreb in 1248, but a sole charter suggests that he held the dignity already since 1247. As he was under the minimum age for a bishop (30 years), a certain Albert, archdeacon and one of the canons of the Zagreb Chapter, challenged his election to Benedict, Archbishop of Kalocsa, who, however, maintained the decision. Following that he petitioned to the Holy See. Albert also argued the chapter had no right to elect the new bishop since at that time it operated under the burden of excommunication. Pope Innocent IV ordered Bulcsú Lád, Bishop of Csanád and two other clergymen to investigate the circumstances of the election and Philip's aptitude. After they have sent the report to the Roman Curia, Pope Innocent confirmed his election on 26 October 1248. According to some reports the king deployed his influence and actively campaigned in favour of his protege through royal envoys in Rome. Béla IV renewed his father's charter regarding the land donation of Slanje (today Croatia) to the living members of the gens Türje, Philip and his brother Thomas.

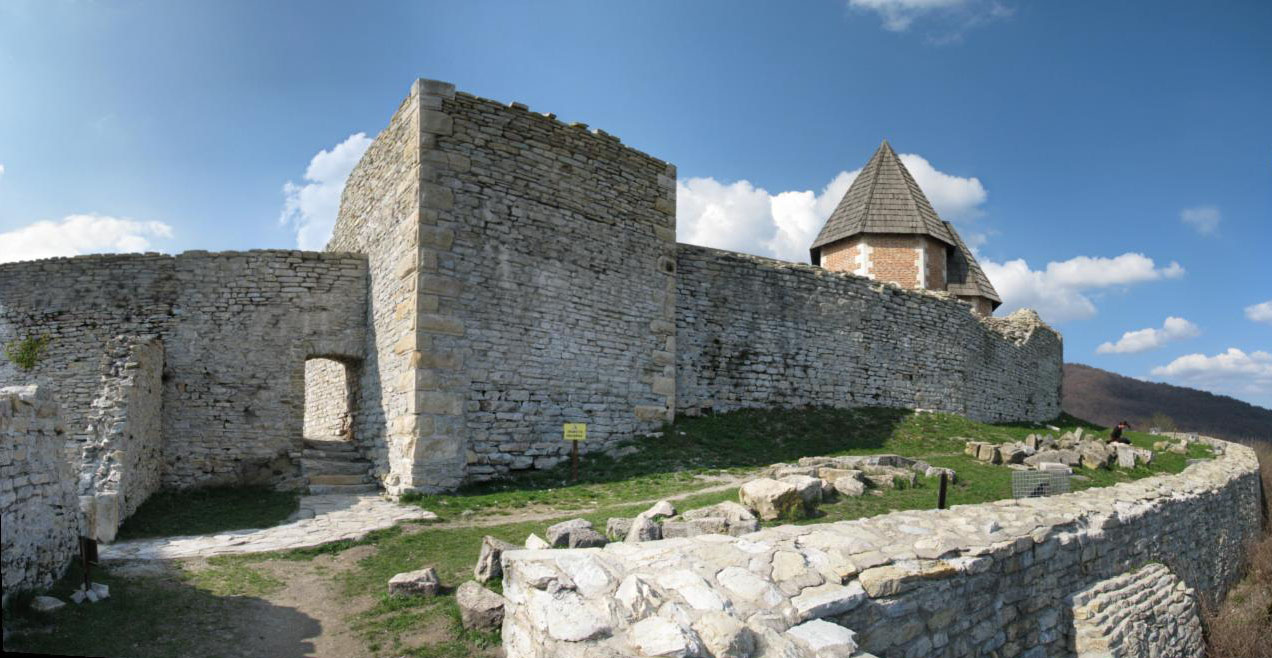
The fortress of Medvedgrad, built by Philip Türje

The two strongest supporters of Béla in Croatia, Bishop Philip and Stephen Gutkeled, Ban of Slavonia took their positions in the same year. Following the Mongol invasion, the province of Slavonia and Croatia had an important function of border defence, as a result Stephen built several castles (including Jablanac) along the borders as part of Béla's radical reforms introduced. The city of Zagreb was destroyed and burned to the ground. This prompted the building of Medvedgrad (lit. "bear-fort"; Hungarian: Medvevár). Also encouraged by Pope Innocent IV, Philip built the fortress between 1249 and 1254. During the implementation of Béla's land reform in the first half of the 1250s, Stephen Gutkeled and Philip Türje frequently acted as co-judges in various lawsuits and border determinations beyond the Drava river.

As bishop, Philip remained a skilled diplomat of Béla IV. Following the first war broke out between the Hungarian monarch and Ottokar II of Bohemia, Philip traveled to Rome regarding a peace agreement in 1253. There he represented Béla's interests. Philip and his companion Ecce, a Franciscan friar reported to Pope Innocent that Béla is ready to retreat and entrust the castles he has captured to papal legates, provided that Ottokar is willing to do the same. Thereafter, Philip also negotiated with Conrad IV of Germany in Naples. Pope Innocent IV mediated a peace treaty, which was signed in Pressburg (present-day Bratislava, Slovakia) on 1 May 1254. In accordance with the treaty, Ottokar ceded Styria to Béla. In recognition of his diplomatic activity in Rome, he was relieved of the summoning for a period of one year by the pope. Béla IV recalled his diplomatic service in July 1267, when praised Philip, who, "in important missions to the Roman Curia and the remote parts of Italy, and in many other countries at his own expense, exposed to weather, sea and road hazards and other inconveniences, he managed all of our cases with success..." and "raising the honor of Our Crown, he has faithfully and cleverly dealt with all the matters entrusted to him". Philip and his episcopal army participated in the Battle of Kressenbrunn in July 1260, where Ottokar defeated the Hungarians and thus Béla was forced to renounce the Duchy of Styria. Despite Philip's loyalty, when the relationship between Béla IV and his eldest son Duke Stephen became tense in the early 1260s, the king, when visited the Slavonian province in the company of his wife Maria in the spring of 1262, Béla confiscated Medvedgrad from Philip to transfer the crown jewels and royal treasures from Székesfehérvár to there for safekeeping, protecting from Stephen. Nominally, the couple's youngest and favorite son Béla ruled the province as duke since 1260. Medvedgrad was never returned to the Diocese of Zagreb, it administered by the bans of Slavonia thereafter.

Returning from Rome in 1254, Philip acquired the land of Waska and the surrounding village Szentmárton for the Bishopric of Zagreb. He had a long-lasting conflict with the citizens of Petrinja, who enjoyed wide privileges since the Mongol invasion. The town refused to pay tithe for the Diocese of Zagreb. As a result, Philip excommunicated the burghers and their elected magistrate, while placed Petrinja under interdict. It has not achieved success, as a result, Philip contributed in 1253 to Petrinja paying the tax in kind. He lifted the excommunication and interdict against the town in 1255. Philip intended to rebuild the Zagreb Cathedral, which was destroyed by the Mongols in 1242. He gained the contribution of Pope Alexander IV too in May 1258, but the construction works have begun only the episcopate of Timothy following the late 1260s.

== Archbishop of Esztergom ==
=== Mediator and conciliator ===
Benedict of Esztergom died in the second half of 1261. Pope Urban IV appointed Philip as Apostolic Administrator of the metropolitan see on 11 January 1262. Pope Urban also invited him to Rome. He was styled as postulated (nominated) archbishop of Esztergom and bishop of Zagreb simultaneously on 7 March 1262. His papal confirmation took place by 8 May. Concurrently with his ecclesiastical dignity, Béla IV appointed him royal chancellor. Philip held the office until the monarch's death in May 1270.

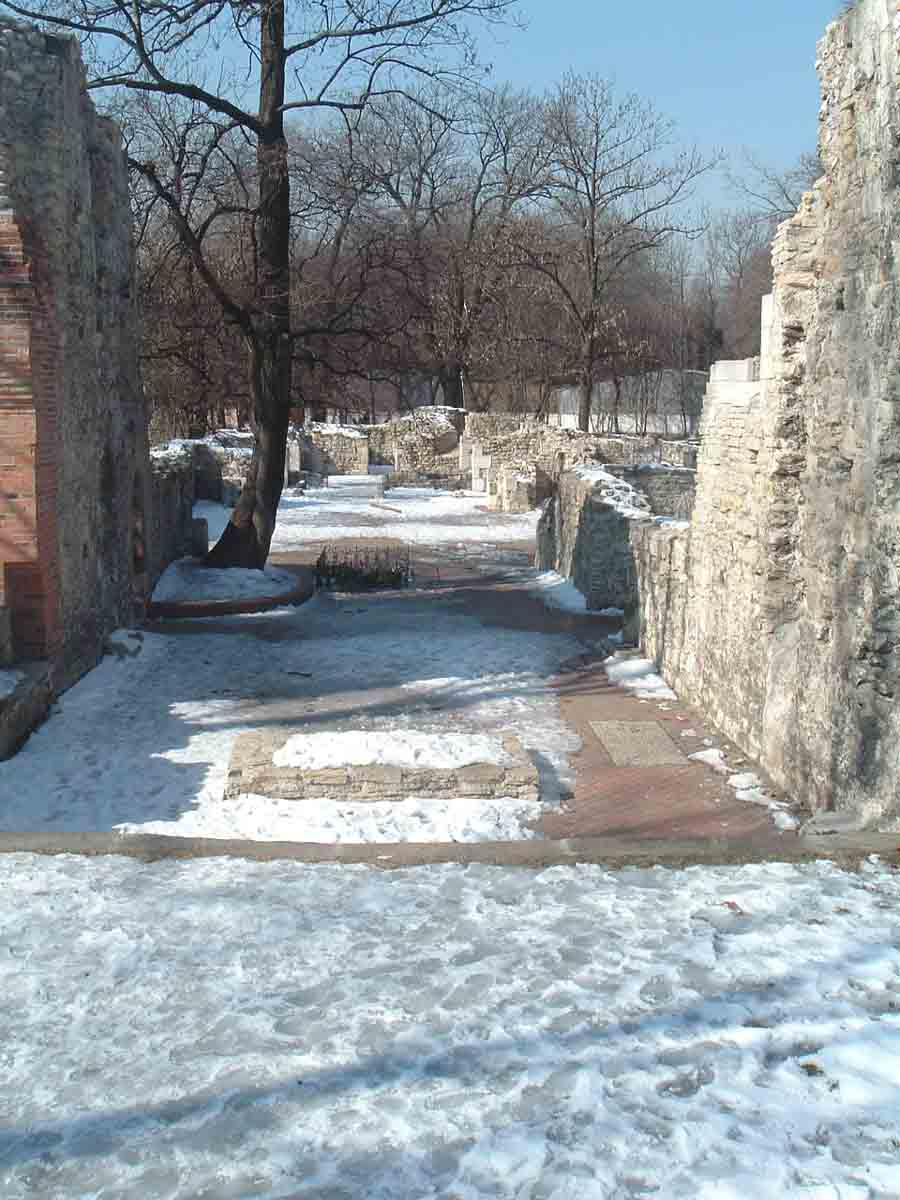
Ruins of the Dominican monastery on Margaret Island, where Philip mediated between Béla IV and his son Stephen

Almost immediately, Philip had to make serious efforts to avoid a bloody civil war in Hungary. Although some clashes took place in the autumn between the royal troops and Stephen's forces, a lasting civil war was avoided through the mediation of the Archbishops Philip and Smaragd of Kalocsa who persuaded Béla and his son to make a compromise. According to the Peace of Pressburg, which was concluded in the autumn of 1262, the two divided the country along the Danube: the lands to the west of the river remained under the direct rule of Béla, and the government of the eastern territories was taken over by Stephen, who also adopted the title junior king. However the truce, in the long term, could not prevent the outbreak of the civil war. After Stephen routed his father's army in the decisive Battle of Isaszeg in March 1265, the two archbishops – Philip and Smaragd – conducted new negotiations between Béla and his son. Their agreement was signed in the Dominican Monastery of the Blessed Virgin on Rabbits' Island on 23 March 1266. The new treaty confirmed the division of the country along the Danube. A later document issued by Béla in July 1267, remembers Philip's efforts with a warm heart, "in order to make the crown's brighter state and to serve our country's integrity and gladness, [Philip acted] as a mediator, even as a shield and a barrier to create inner peace [...], exposed himself to heavy spending, dangers and tribulation". In addition to the peace treaty, Béla entrusted Philip and Smaragd to warn the baptized Cumans – who fought on Stephen's side in the war – to keep their faith, otherwise expel them from the kingdom. Simultaneously, Pope Clement IV authorized the two archbishops to lead troops against the Mongols and other pagans.

After his appointment, Philip established his own court and chancellery in Esztergom, consisting with highly educated canon jurists and notaries. For instance, one of his chancellors was the illustrious diplomat Sixtus from 1264 to 1268. In late 1262, Béla IV confirmed the privileges of the Archdiocese of Esztergom on the occasion of Philip's appointment. At the request of the archbishop, the monarch widened the granted privileges on several occasions; for example, the Saxon hospes of Lipcse (today Partizánska Ľupča, Slovakia), who were subjects of the archbishopric, were granted tax exemption, in addition to the parishes in Korpona and Selmecbánya (present-day Krupina and Banská Štiavnica, respectively), which had to pay the tithe to the Esztergom chapter, instead of the royal treasury. In 1263, Béla also donated the right of patronage to Philip and his successors over the St. Pantleon monastery, which laid in an island on the Danube (today ruins in Dunaújváros). The archdiocese was also granted the annual tithe from the chamber's profit (lucrum camerae) beyond the Dráva river in March 1272. The parish of Szentistván (named after martyr Saint Stephen) and St. Anne chapel in Örmény (former boroughs of Esztergom) were established during Philip's episcopate.

During his episcopate, Pope Clement IV confirmed the privileges of the provostry of Titel and the Tihany Abbey in 1268, and assigned them under the supervision of the Archdiocese of Esztergom. Philip was trying to protect his privileges against his suffragan bishops during his 10-year term. For instance, in the 1263 Synod of Buda, he emphasized his exclusive right to wear of pallium, after Job Záh, Bishop of Pécs declared that he was not only entitled to wear the pallium, but his diocese was also independent of the see of Esztergom. For this, Philip and his successors regarded Job as being excommunicated for ignoring their authority. According to a document from 1264, Philip protected the rights of the provostry of Szeben (today Sibiu, Romania), which then belonged to Esztergom, even against Gallus, Bishop of Transylvania and his efforts. Philip also bought several lands in Esztergom and Komárom counties to expand the agricultural and economic estate of the archbishopric. He was involved in numerous border conflicts with the provostry of Dömös, and several secular authorities, including Dominic, ispán of Sáros County. Stephen V himself acted as a mediator and conciliator in the two cases mentioned.

Philip had also conflict with the abbey of Garamszentbenedek. According to a complaint by abbot Martin in 1276, Philip had seized some possessions of the Benedictine monastery and he did not return all of these, for instance, portions in Kakat (present-day Štúrovo, Slovakia), Udvard (present-day Dvory nad Žitavou, Slovakia) along with the abbot's mansion, in addition to the estates Nempti, Szöllős, Csejkő and Berzence in Bars County (present-day Tekovské Nemce, Rybník, Čajkov and Tekovská Breznica in Slovakia, respectively). Between 1265 and 1268, Philip bought several portions in Udvard, along with its river duty and two nearby estates, Örs and Vért in Örs. It is possible that he intended to establish an economic centre of his ecclesiastical lordship in Udvard, but because of the objections of the abbey, he decided not to do so. Thereafter, he transferred his lordship centre to Naszvad (present-day Nesvady, Slovakia) by 1269. Philip bought the estates Szalatna, Zellő és Verbenye in Nógrád County for the archdiocese from local nobles in 1265; this purchase legalized the unlawful occupation of these lands by a previous archbishop Stephen I Báncsa. He also acquired Baracs (today Bardoňovo, Slovakia) in Bars County from Dominic Csák for 40 marks in 1269. Philip was involved in a lawsuit with Dominic Balassa, the ispán of Sáros County, before the court of junior king Stephen in 1270; there was an island in the middle of the Sajó river between their estates Püspöki and Pogony in Gömör County. As a result of the verdict, Philip bought the island for 5 marks. In several cases, Philip's officialis was a certain Levos Sárói, who owned a land in Bars County. He could only sell his land in 1271 on the condition that the buyer would be an ecclesiastical noble of the archdiocese.

=== Last years ===
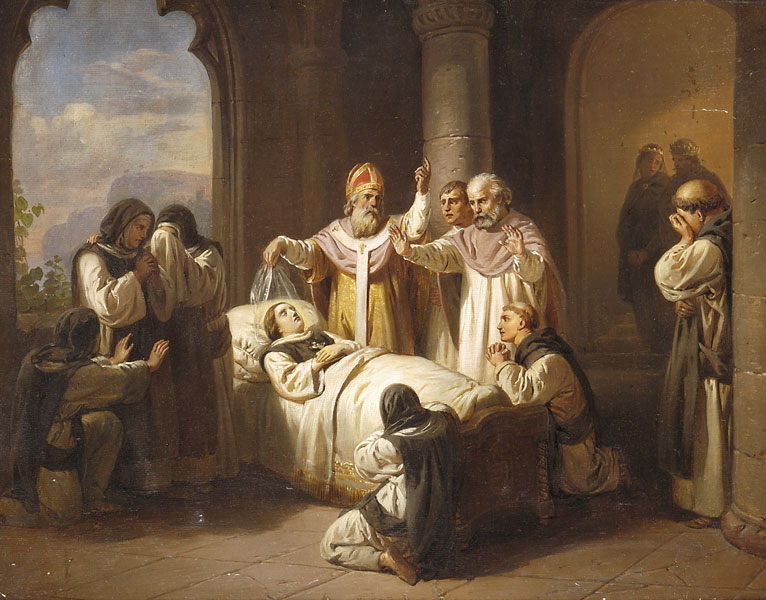
Philip Türje was present at the death of St. Margaret in January 1270, a painting by József Molnár (1857)

Béla IV died on 3 May 1270 after 35 years of reign. According to his last will and testament, he was buried in the church of the Conventual Franciscans in Esztergom, next to his youngest son Béla, who predeceased him. However, as 15th-century historian Antonio Bonfini recorded, Philip had his corpse transferred to the Esztergom Cathedral and reburied him amid bright ceremony. Upon the intervention of the Holy See, the Minorites only succeeded in regaining Béla's remains after a long lawsuit. After Béla's death, his daughter, Anna, seized the royal treasury and fled to Bohemia, while other lords rebelled against the rightful heir. Arriving from his province in Eastern Hungary, Duke Stephen immediately left Székesfehérvár for Esztergom to ensure the safety of coronation jewelry. Following that Duke Stephen and Archbishop Philip jointly returned to Székesfehérvár, where Philip crowned him in early June 1270. Although Philip was replaced as royal chancellor by Stephen V's loyal prelate Stephen II Báncsa, the ispánate of Esztergom was granted to the Archdiocese of Esztergom on 18 May 1270, thus Philip became the first perpetual count (or ispán) ever in Hungarian history. Since then the archbishops were simultaneously also styled as ispáns of Esztergom County with some minor interruptions until the 20th century. Philip was involved in the peace attempts between Stephen and Ottokar in the summer of 1270. He sent his chancellor Anthony (also a legal scholar and archdeacon of Sasvár) to escort Stephen's envoys to the Bohemian court.

Stephen's sister, the Dominican nun Margaret died on 18 January 1270, Philip was present at her deathbed. Steps were taken to procure her canonization shortly after her death, at the request of her brother. Upon Stephen's intercession, Pope Gregory X commissioned Philip to investigate her miracles, but the church committee suspended its work after the death of Philip in late 1272, and resumed investigation process only after a four-year forced break. Archbishop Philip supported Stephen V in his war against Ottokar II and his domestic supporters. When Stephen V and the Bohemian king reached an agreement in Pressburg on 2 July 1271 after their brief war, Stephen V stated in the document, if he breaks the treaty, archbishops Philip Türje and Stephen Báncsa will be given the mandate for excommunication. Philip Türje and Bruno von Schauenburg, Bishop of Olomouc were mandated to discuss and resolve the possible issues concerning national borders between Hungary and Bohemia. Although Philip initially actively supported the peace process, he remained absent from official negotiations and drafting of the document, and he did not even explain his absence in a letter, which unsettled Ottokar at one point. The reason for Philip's absence is unknown. The barons of the realm, as they wrote in their letter to Ottokar, could not convince Philip to change his position. The newly crowned Pope Gregory X, who confirmed the treaty in May 1272, instructed prelates Philip of Esztergom, Philip of Vác, Bruno of Olomouc and John of Prague to do everything possible to preserve peace and to comply with the terms of the treaty.

The king died suddenly in August 1272. His death marked the beginning of the era of feudal anarchy, when many groupings of barons fought against each other for supreme power. Ensuring the order of succession and continuity of the strong royal power, Philip crowned the 10-year-old Ladislaus IV king in Székesfehérvár on about 3 September. Before that heavy clashes occurred near the town between the rival baronial groups, during which the arriving Philip and his escort were also insulted, robbed and physically abused, causing a damage of 400 marks for the archdiocese. The minor king, in theory, ruled under his mother's regency, but in fact, baronial parties administered the kingdom. However, the elderly Philip distanced himself from the conflict, and was unable to prevent the spread of anarchy. A few days before his death, Philip was reinstated as royal chancellor. He died on 18 December 1272. His death gave rise to an effective 7-year period of vacancy in the episcopal see of Esztergom.

== Sources ==
- Beke, Margit (2003). "Türje nembeli Szentgróti Fülöp [Philip of Szentgrót from the kindred Türje]". In Beke, Margit (ed.). Esztergomi érsekek 1001–2003 [Archbishops of Esztergom 1001–2003] (in Hungarian). Szent István Társulat. pp. 115–121. ISBN 963-361-472-4.
- Dobronić, Lelja (1995). "Filip [Philip]". In Franko, Mirošević (ed.). Zagrebački biskupi i nadbiskupi [Bishops and Archbishops of Zagreb] (in Croatian). Školska knjiga. pp. 47–59. ISBN 953-0-60597-8.
- Haraszti Szabó, Péter; Kelényi, Borbála (2019). Magyarországi diákok francia, angol, itáliai és német egyetemeken a középkorban, 1100–1526 [Students from Hungary at the Universities of France, England, Italy and Germany in the Middle Ages 1100–1526] (in Hungarian). ELTE Egyetemi Könyvtár és Levéltár; MTA ELTE Egyetemtörténeti Kutatócsoport. ISBN 978-963-489-098-0.
- Kis, Péter (2000). "Az esztergomi érsekek uradalomszervezése a XIII. század második felében [The Organization of Lordships by the Archbishops of Esztergom in the Second Half of the 13th Century]". In Piti, Ferenc; Szabados, György (eds.). "Magyaroknak eleiről". Ünnepi tanulmányok a hatvan esztendős Makk Ferenc tiszteletére (in Hungarian). Szegedi Középkorász Műhely. pp. 225–248. ISBN 963-482-500-1.
- Markó, László (2006). A magyar állam főméltóságai Szent Istvántól napjainkig: Életrajzi Lexikon [Great Officers of State in Hungary from King Saint Stephen to Our Days: A Biographical Encyclopedia] (in Hungarian). Helikon Kiadó. ISBN 963-208-970-7.
- Rudolf, Veronika (2023). Közép-Európa a hosszú 13. században [Central Europe in the Long 13th Century] (in Hungarian). Arpadiana XV., Research Centre for the Humanities. ISBN 978-963-416-406-7.
- Szűcs, Jenő (1978). "A kereszténység belső politikuma a XIII. század derekán. IV. Béla király és az egyház [The Inner Politics of Christendom in the Middle of the 13th Century: King Béla IV and the Church]". Történelmi Szemle (in Hungarian). 21 (1). Hungarian Academy of Sciences: 158–181. ISSN 0040-9634.
- Thoroczkay, Gábor (2012). "A dömösi prépostság története alapításától I. Károly uralkodásának végéig [The History of the Provostry of Dömös from Its Foundation Until the End of the Reign of Charles I]". Fons (in Hungarian). 19 (4). Szentpétery Imre Történettudományi Alapítvány: 409–433. ISSN 1217-8020.
- Varga, Virág (2024). "A Türje nembeli Szentgrótiak a 13. században és a 14. század első felében [The Szentgróti Family of the Türje Kindred in the 13th Century and the First Half of 14th Century]". In Hunyadi, Sándor; et al. (eds.). Micae Mediaevales XIII (in Hungarian). Eötvös Loránd University. pp. 121–149. ISSN 2062-2198.
- Zsoldos, Attila (2007). Családi ügy: IV. Béla és István ifjabb király viszálya az 1260-as években [A family affair: The Conflict between Béla IV and Junior King Stephen in the 1260s] (in Hungarian). História, MTA Történettudományi Intézete. ISBN 978-963-9627-15-4.
- Zsoldos, Attila (2011). Magyarország világi archontológiája, 1000–1301 [Secular Archontology of Hungary, 1000–1301] (in Hungarian). História, MTA Történettudományi Intézete. ISBN 978-963-9627-38-3.

Philip Genus Türje Born: c. 1218 Died: 18 December 1272
Political offices
Preceded by Zlaudus Ják (?)	Chancellor of the Queen; 1246–1248	Succeeded by Ákos
Preceded by Benedict	Chancellor; 1262–1270	Succeeded by Stephen Báncsa
Preceded by Cosmas	Ispán of Esztergom; 1270–1272	Succeeded by Nicholas Kán
Preceded by Paul Balog	Chancellor; 1272	Succeeded by Paul Balog
Catholic Church titles
Preceded by Stephen	Bishop of Zagreb; 1247/8–1262	Succeeded by Farkas Bejc (elected)
Preceded by Benedict	Archbishop of Esztergom; 1262–1272	Succeeded by Nicholas Kán (elected)
