= Denis Türje (chancellor) =

Hungarian courtier in the 13th century,

Denis (III) Türje

Chancellor of the Cupbearers
- Reign: 1270
- Died: 1270/1281
- Noble family: gens Türje
- Issue: Desiderius
- Father: Thomas I

Denis (III) from the kindred Türje (Hungarian: Türje nembeli (III.) Dénes; died after 1270) was a Hungarian courtier in the 13th century, who served as Chancellor of the Cupbearers in 1270.

== Career ==
Denis (III) was born into the Szentgrót branch of the gens (clan) Türje, which originated from Zala County. He was the eldest son of Thomas (I) and his unidentified wife. He had two brothers, Philip (II) – the progenitor of the Szentgróti family – and Thomas (II). The marriage of Denis with an unidentified noblewoman produced a son Desiderius, who had no known descendants.

Denis started his career as a "royal servant" (Latin: serviens domine regine) of the court of Queen Maria Laskarina; several members of the kindred were faithful confidants of both Béla IV and Maria. His father Thomas died sometime between 1267 and 1270. Béla, Duke of Slavonia confiscated their inherited land Prodaviz in Križevci County (present-day Virje, Croatia) from Denis and his brothers around 1268. After the duke's death in 1269, King Béla IV recovered the estate to them. After Stephen V of Hungary ascended the Hungarian throne, he confirmed and transcribed his father's donation of letter regarding Prodaviz and its tax privileges to Denis and his brothers in September 1270. The document refers to Denis as Chancellor of the Cupbearers (Latin: cancellarius pincernarum) which is the only mention of the existence of that minor dignity in the royal court.

Prior to 1279, Denis and his brothers concluded a property distribution agreement with their relative Pousa (I) from the clan's Bér branch. According to the second division contract from 1299, Denis had violent conflicts with the clan's Bér branch over the boundaries of the ancestral seat Türje. Denis died prior to 1281, when his son Desiderius agreed to sell Dabronc.

== Sources ==
- Varga, Virág (2024). "A Türje nembeli Szentgrótiak a 13. században és a 14. század első felében [The Szentgróti Family of the Türje Kindred in the 13th Century and the First Half of 14th Century]". In Hunyadi, Sándor; et al. (eds.). Micae Mediaevales XIII (in Hungarian). Eötvös Loránd University. pp. 121–149. ISSN 2062-2198.
- Zsoldos, Attila (2011). Magyarország világi archontológiája, 1000–1301 [Secular Archontology of Hungary, 1000–1301] (in Hungarian). História, MTA Történettudományi Intézete. ISBN 978-963-9627-38-3.
