= Tompaládony =

- Coat of arms

- Location of Tompaládony in Hungary
- Coordinates: 47°22′45.70″N 16°52′52.39″E
- Country: Hungary
- Region: Western Transdanubia
- County: Vas
- Subregion: Csepregi
- Rank: Village

Area
  - Total: 9.44 km^{2} (3.64 sq mi)

Population (1 January 2008)
  - Total: 316
  - Density: 33.5/km^{2} (86.7/sq mi)
- Time zone: UTC+1 (CET)
  - Summer (DST): UTC+2 (CEST)
- Postal code: 9662
- Area code: +36 94
- KSH code: 12335

Tompaládony is a village in Vas county, Hungary.
