= Jalovec, Prievidza District =

Jalovec
- Municipality
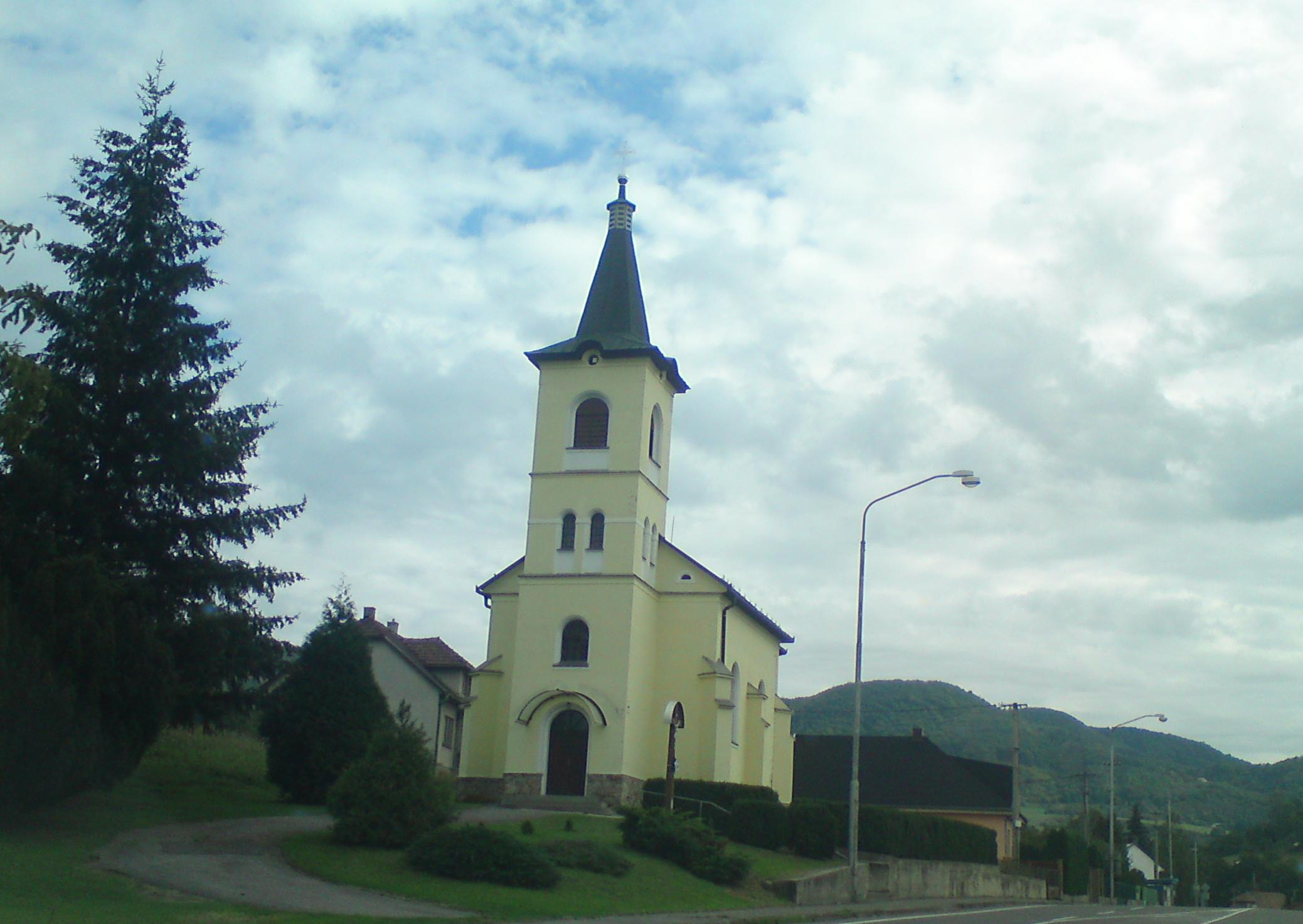

- Flag

- Location of Jalovec in the Trenčín Region Location of Jalovec in Slovakia
- Coordinates: 48.7717°N 18.7745°E
- Country: Slovakia
- Region: Trenčín Region
- District: Prievidza District
- First mentioned: 1430

Area
  - Total: 6.02 km^{2} (2.32 sq mi)
- Elevation: 348 m (1,142 ft)

Population (2025)
  - Total: 586
- Time zone: UTC+1 (CET)
  - Summer (DST): UTC+2 (CEST)
- Postal code: 972 31
- Area code: +421 46
- Vehicle registration plate (until 2022): PD
- Website: www.jalovec.eu

Jalovec (Hungarian: Parlag) is a village and municipality in the Prievidza District in the Trenčín Region of western Slovakia.

== History ==
In historical records the village was first mentioned in 1430.

== Geography ==
The municipality lies at an altitude of 348 metres (1,142 ft) and covers an area of 6.02 km^{2} (2.32 sq mi) (2025).

== Population ==
Population statistic (10 years)
Year	1995	2005	2015	2025
Count	528	560	572	586
Difference		+6.06%	+2.14%	+2.44%

Population statistic
Year	2024	2025
Count	591	586
Difference		−0.84%

It has a population of 586 people (31 December 2025).

=== Ethnicity ===
Census 2021 (1+ %)
Ethnicity	Number	Fraction
Slovak	550	97.17%
Not found out	14	2.47%
Total	566	

In year 2021 was 566 people by ethnicity 550 as Slovak, 14 as Not found out, 4 as Czech, 3 as German, 2 as Hungarian and 2 as Other.

Note on population: The difference values of population numbers in the table "Population statistic" and in the sections "Ethnicity" & "Religion" is caused by the use of various statistical methods.

=== Religion ===
Census 2021 (1+ %)
Religion	Number	Fraction
Roman Catholic Church	301	53.18%
None	228	40.28%
Not found out	11	1.94%
Evangelical Church	8	1.41%
Total	566	

In year 2021 was 566 people by religion 301 from Roman Catholic Church, 228 from None, 11 from Not found out, 8 from Evangelical Church, 5 from Other and not ascertained christian church, 3 from Greek Catholic Church, 3 from Ad hoc movements, 2 from Christian Congregations in Slovakia, 2 from Buddhism, 1 from Other, 1 from Hinduism and 1 from Baptists Church.

== Genealogical resources ==
The records for genealogical research are available at the state archive "Statny Archiv in Nitra, Slovakia"

- Roman Catholic church records (births/marriages/deaths): 1698-1929 (parish B)

== See also ==
- List of municipalities and towns in Slovakia
