= Veselé, Slovakia =

Veselé
- Municipality
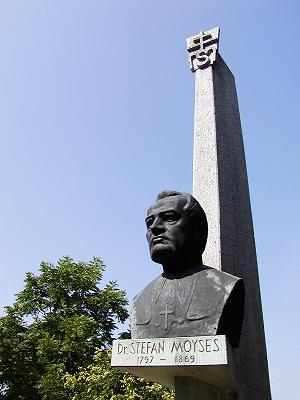

- Flag

- Location of Veselé in the Trnava Region Location of Veselé in Slovakia
- Coordinates: 48°32′49″N 17°44′07″E
- Country: Slovakia
- Region: Trnava Region
- District: Piešťany District
- First mentioned: 1390

Area
  - Total: 13.86 km^{2} (5.35 sq mi)
- Elevation: 157 m (515 ft)

Population (2025)
  - Total: 1,234
- Time zone: UTC+1 (CET)
  - Summer (DST): UTC+2 (CEST)
- Postal code: 922 08
- Area code: +421 33
- Vehicle registration plate (until 2022): PN
- Website: www.vesele.sk

Veselé (Hungarian: Vígvár) is a village and municipality in Piešťany District in the Trnava Region of western Slovakia.

== Geography ==
The municipality lies at an altitude of 157 metres (515 ft) and covers an area of 13.86 km^{2} (5.35 sq mi) (2025).

== History ==
In historical records the village was first mentioned in 1390.

== Population ==
Population statistic (10 years)
Year	1995	2005	2015	2025
Count	1093	1127	1197	1234
Difference		+3.11%	+6.21%	+3.09%

Population statistic
Year	2024	2025
Count	1246	1234
Difference		−0.96%

It has a population of 1234 people (31 December 2025).

=== Ethnicity ===
Census 2021 (1+ %)
Ethnicity	Number	Fraction
Slovak	1159	94.68%
Not found out	57	4.65%
Total	1224	

In year 2021 was 1224 people by ethnicity 1159 as Slovak, 57 as Not found out, 10 as Czech, 2 as Rusyn, 2 as Russian, 2 as Hungarian, 2 as Croatian, 1 as Ukrainian, 1 as Serbian, 1 as Romani, 1 as Austrian, 1 as German and 1 as Other.

Note on population: The difference values of population numbers in the table "Population statistic" and in the sections "Ethnicity" & "Religion" is caused by the use of various statistical methods.

=== Religion ===
Census 2021 (1+ %)
Religion	Number	Fraction
Roman Catholic Church	903	73.77%
None	208	16.99%
Not found out	63	5.15%
Evangelical Church	21	1.72%
Total	1224	

In year 2021 was 1224 people by religion 903 from Roman Catholic Church, 208 from None, 63 from Not found out, 21 from Evangelical Church, 6 from Paganism and natural spirituality, 5 from Church of the Brethren, 4 from Greek Catholic Church, 4 from Buddhism, 3 from Jehovah's Witnesses, 2 from Eastern Orthodox Church, 2 from Other, 1 from Calvinist Church, 1 from Islam and 1 from Ad hoc movements.
