= Čamovce =

Čamovce Csomatelke
- Municipality
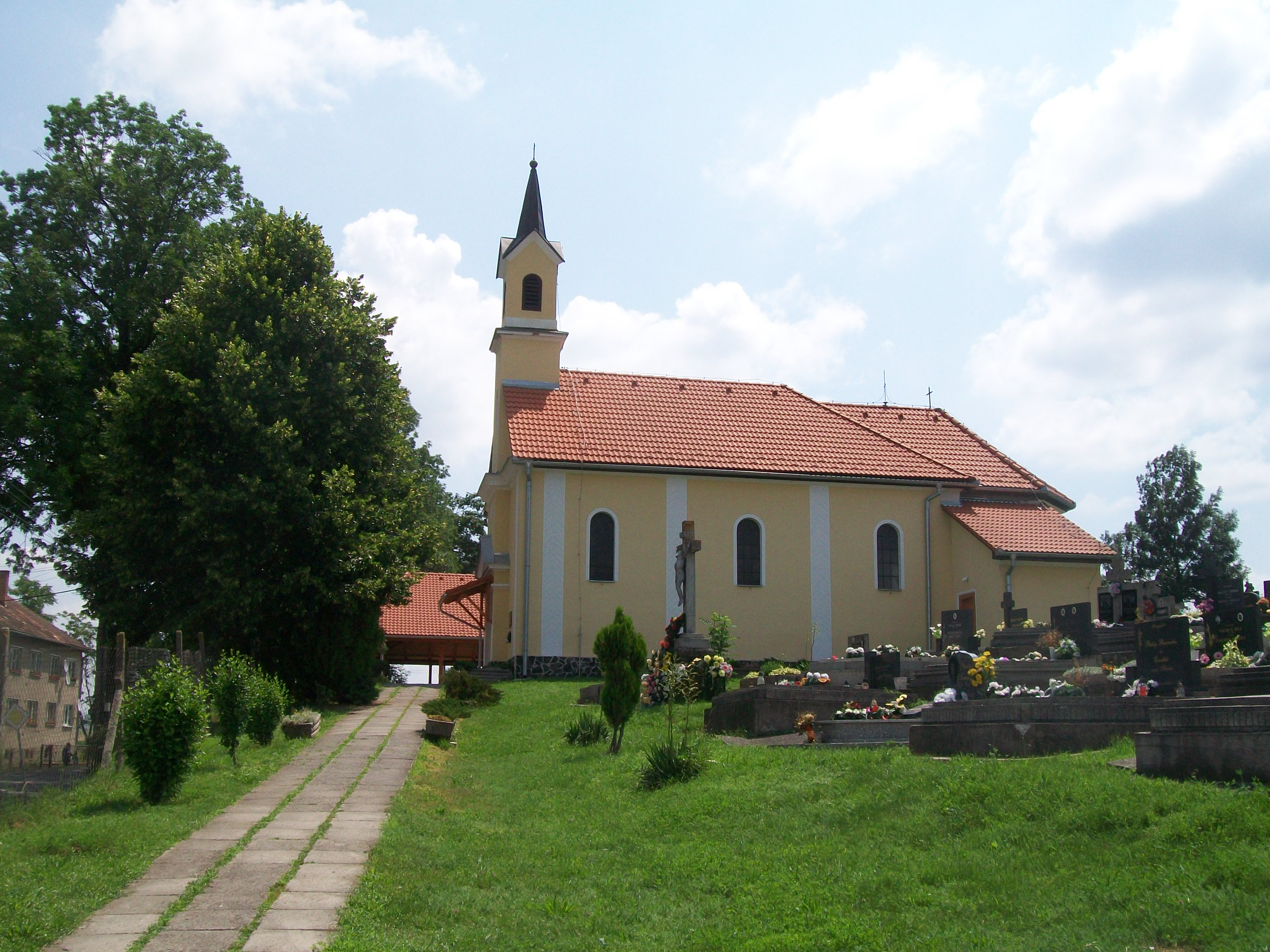

- Flag

- Location of Čamovce in the Banská Bystrica Region Location of Čamovce in Slovakia
- Coordinates: 48.25°N 19.88°E
- Country: Slovakia
- Region: Banská Bystrica Region
- District: Lučenec District
- First mentioned: 1240

Area
  - Total: 12.61 km^{2} (4.87 sq mi)
- Elevation: 207 m (679 ft)

Population (2025)
  - Total: 565
- Time zone: UTC+1 (CET)
  - Summer (DST): UTC+2 (CEST)
- Postal code: 986 01
- Area code: +421 47
- Vehicle registration plate (until 2022): LC
- Website: camovce.webnode.sk

Čamovce (before 1948: Čoma; Hungarian: Csomatelke, earlier: Csoma) is a village and municipality in the Lučenec District in the Banská Bystrica Region of Slovakia.

== Geography ==
The municipality lies at an altitude of 207 metres (679 ft) and covers an area of 12.61 km^{2} (4.87 sq mi) (2025).

== History ==
The village arose in the 12th century. It was first mentioned in 1240 (Chama) . It belonged to Hajnáčka and, successively, to the families Feledyi, Lorantfy, Vecsény and Vay. It suffered under Turkish attacks; the Turks imposed to the village to pay taxes in the form of wood and horseshoes. Turkish incursion ended only in 1683, when the Turks burned the village down. From 1938 to 1944 it briefly returned to Hungary under the First Vienna Award.

== Population ==
Population statistic (10 years)
| Year | 1995 | 2005 | 2015 | 2025 |
|---|---|---|---|---|
| Count | 511 | 508 | 619 | 565 |
| Difference | | −0.58% | +21.85% | −8.72% |

Population statistic
| Year | 2024 | 2025 |
|---|---|---|
| Count | 569 | 565 |
| Difference | | −0.70% |

It has a population of 565 people (31 December 2025).

=== Ethnicity ===
Census 2021 (1+ %)
| Ethnicity | Number | Fraction |
|---|---|---|
| Hungarian | 394 | 67.81% |
| Slovak | 125 | 21.51% |
| Romani | 71 | 12.22% |
| Not found out | 40 | 6.88% |
| Total | 581 | |

In year 2021 was 581 people by ethnicity 394 as Hungarian, 125 as Slovak, 71 as Romani and 40 as Not found out.

Note on population: The difference values of population numbers in the table "Population statistic" and in the sections "Ethnicity" & "Religion" is caused by the use of various statistical methods.

=== Religion ===
Census 2021 (1+ %)
| Religion | Number | Fraction |
|---|---|---|
| Roman Catholic Church | 489 | 84.17% |
| None | 45 | 7.75% |
| Not found out | 35 | 6.02% |
| Total | 581 | |

In year 2021 was 581 people by religion 489 from Roman Catholic Church, 45 from None, 35 from Not found out, 4 from Greek Catholic Church, 3 from Calvinist Church, 3 from Christian Congregations in Slovakia and 2 from Evangelical Church.

== Genealogical resources ==
The records for genealogical research are available at the state archive "Statny Archiv in Banska Bystrica, Slovakia"

- Roman Catholic church records (births/marriages/deaths): 1787-1898 (parish B)

== See also ==
- List of municipalities and towns in Slovakia
