= Zalabér =

- Village
- Flag Coat of arms

- Location of Zalabér
- Coordinates: 46.973661°N 17.029581°E
- Country: Hungary
- Region: Western Transdanubia
- County: Zala
- District: Zalaszentgrót

Area
  - Total: 12.78 km^{2} (4.93 sq mi)

Population (1 January 2026)
  - Total: 652
  - Density: 51.0/km^{2} (132/sq mi)
- Time zone: UTC+1 (CET)
  - Summer (DST): UTC+2 (CEST)
- Postal code: 8798
- Area code: (+36) 83
- Website: zalaber.hu

Zalabér is a village in Zala County, Hungary.
