= Nitrica =

- Municipality
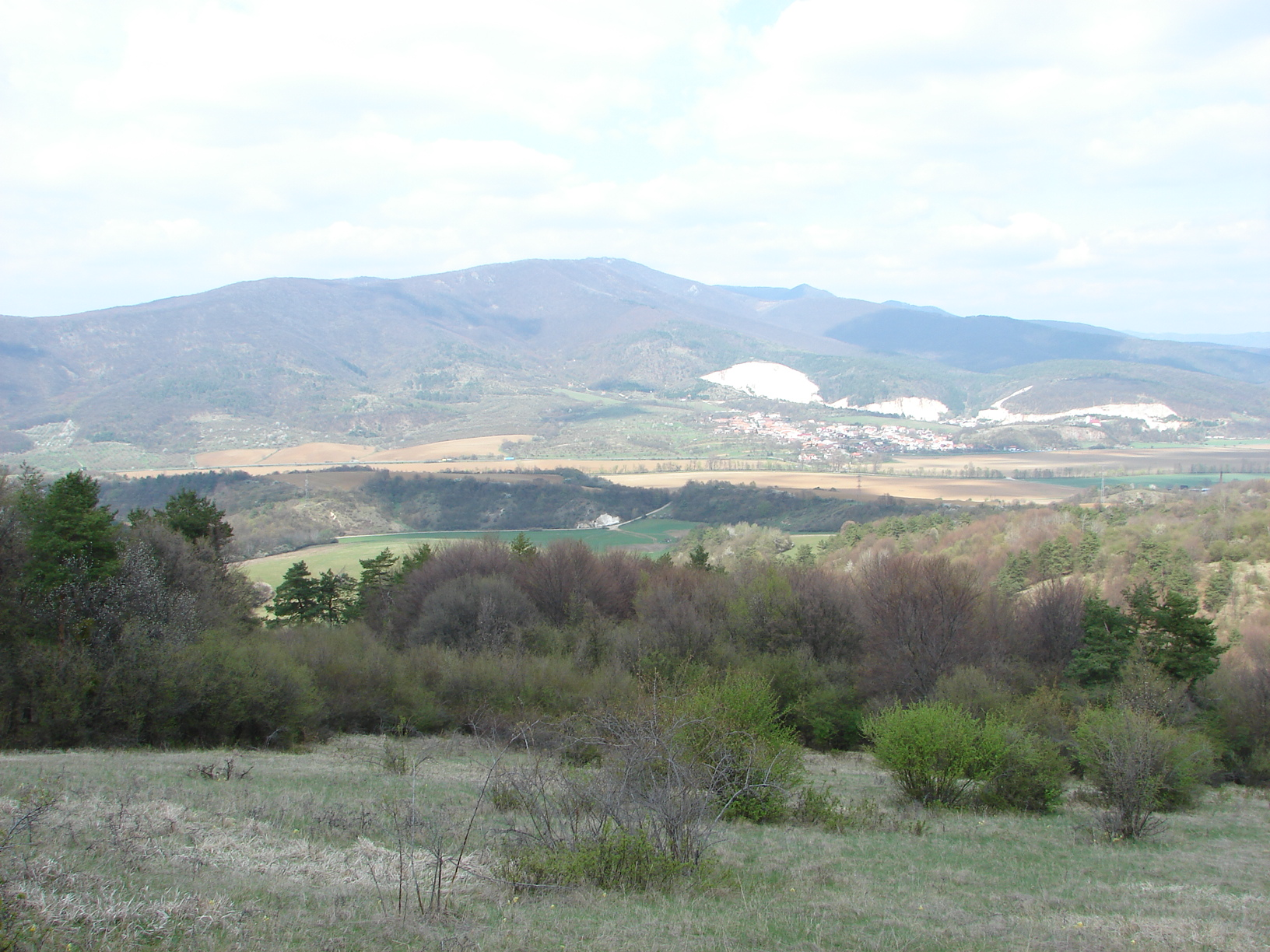

- Flag

- Location of Nitrica in the Trenčín Region Location of Nitrica in Slovakia
- Coordinates: 48.70°N 18.45°E
- Country: Slovakia
- Region: Trenčín Region
- District: Prievidza District
- First mentioned: 1113

Area
  - Total: 24.03 km^{2} (9.28 sq mi)
- Elevation: 243 m (797 ft)

Population (2025)
  - Total: 1,141
- Time zone: UTC+1 (CET)
  - Summer (DST): UTC+2 (CEST)
- Postal code: 972 22
- Area code: +421 46
- Vehicle registration plate (until 2022): PD
- Website: www.obecnitrica.sk

Nitrica (Hungarian: Rákosvölgyudvarnok) is a village and municipality in Prievidza District in the Trenčín Region of western Slovakia.

== History ==
The first written mention of the village dates back to 1113, when the upper part of the village called Račice was mentioned, which today forms the upper part of the current village. Dvorníky are already mentioned in the Zoborská listina in 1249. By merging both parts of the village in 1960, the current village of Nitrica was created.

No written reports have been preserved about the development of the village. It is known from the oral narratives of older people that the inhabitants here were engaged in agriculture, small-scale trade and selling fruit, and in the earliest times also selling clay vessels that they made themselves. The main source of livelihood for the local population was fruit growing associated with trade. After the first merchants from Račíce and Dvorník, the local nickname "korenári" (root-salesmen) is used to this day - after the merchants who traded in spices, mainly saffron.

== Monuments and sights ==
A new church dedicated to St. Michael was built in the village in 2013, and there is a chapel dedicated to the Divine Heart of Jesus, which was built in 1919 by Michal Šramka and his wife Karolína in memory of their two sons who died in the World War on the Russian battlefield.

== Geography ==
The municipality lies at an altitude of 243 metres (797 ft) and covers an area of 24.03 km^{2} (9.28 sq mi) (2025).

== Population ==
Population statistic (10 years)
Year	1995	2005	2015	2025
Count	1217	1262	1217	1141
Difference		+3.69%	−3.56%	−6.24%

Population statistic
Year	2024	2025
Count	1151	1141
Difference		−0.86%

It has a population of 1141 people (31 December 2025).

=== Ethnicity ===
Census 2021 (1+ %)
Ethnicity	Number	Fraction
Slovak	1160	98.13%
Not found out	18	1.52%
Total	1182	

In year 2021 was 1182 people by ethnicity 1160 as Slovak, 18 as Not found out, 7 as Czech, 3 as Hungarian, 1 as Italian, 1 as Romani, 1 as Austrian, 1 as German, 1 as Moravian and 1 as Other.

Note on population: The difference values of population numbers in the table "Population statistic" and in the sections "Ethnicity" & "Religion" is caused by the use of various statistical methods.

=== Religion ===
Census 2021 (1+ %)
Religion	Number	Fraction
Roman Catholic Church	924	78.17%
None	212	17.94%
Not found out	20	1.69%
Total	1182	

In year 2021 was 1182 people by religion 924 from Roman Catholic Church, 212 from None, 20 from Not found out, 5 from Christian Congregations in Slovakia, 3 from Greek Catholic Church, 3 from Evangelical Church, 3 from Buddhism, 3 from Ad hoc movements, 2 from Paganism and natural spirituality, 2 from Jehovah's Witnesses, 1 from Old Catholic Church, 1 from Calvinist Church, 1 from Eastern Orthodox Church, 1 from Other and 1 from Baptists Church.
