= Gortva =

Municipality of Slovakia

Gortva Gortvakisfalud
- Municipality
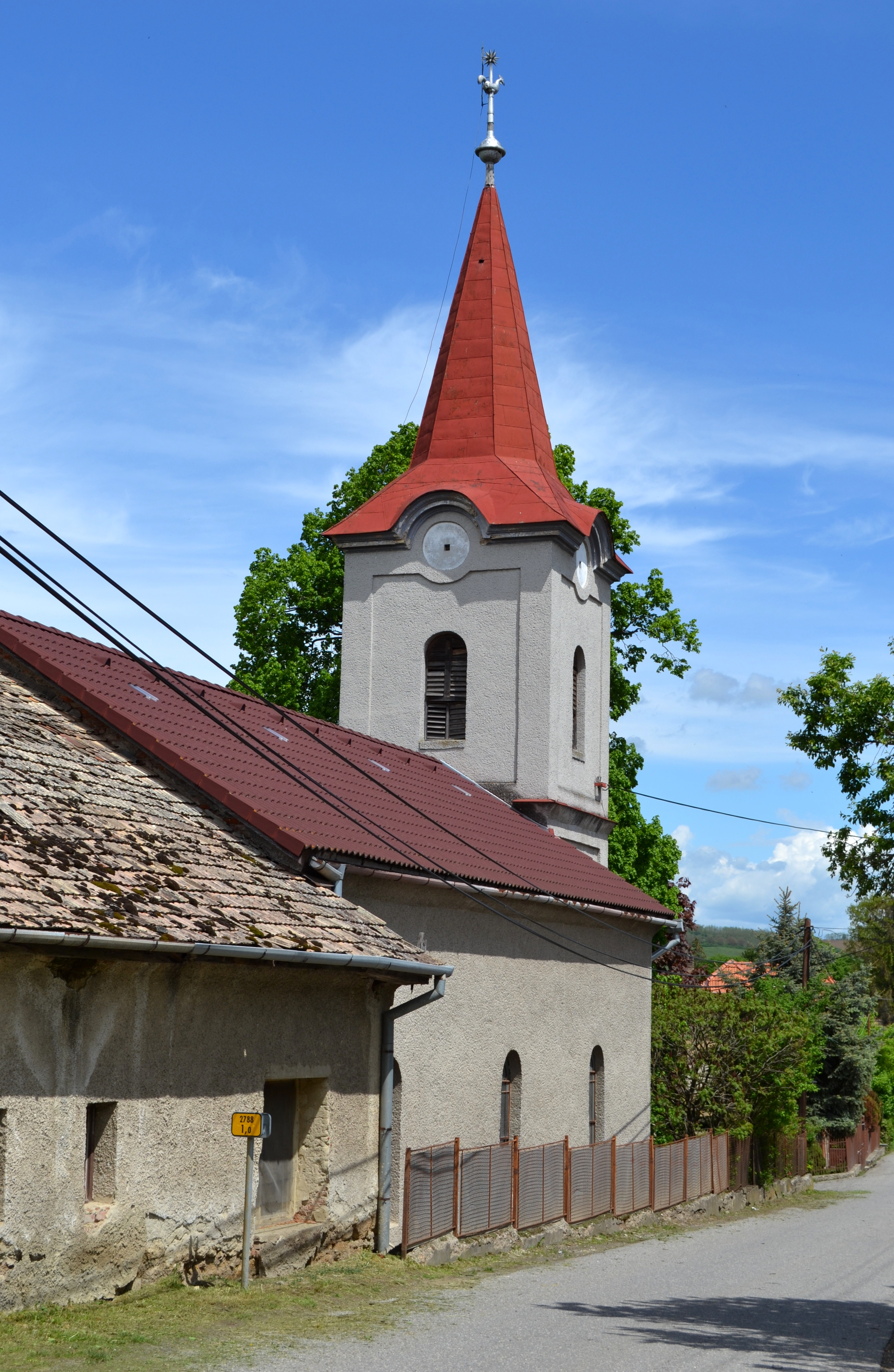

- Flag

- Location of Gortva in the Banská Bystrica Region Location of Gortva in Slovakia
- Coordinates: 48.30°N 20.02°E
- Country: Slovakia
- Region: Banská Bystrica Region
- District: Rimavská Sobota District
- First mentioned: 1326

Area
  - Total: 9.63 km^{2} (3.72 sq mi)
- Elevation: 187 m (614 ft)

Population (2025)
  - Total: 474
- Time zone: UTC+1 (CET)
  - Summer (DST): UTC+2 (CEST)
- Postal code: 980 33
- Area code: +421 47
- Vehicle registration plate (until 2022): RS
- Website: www.gortva.sk

Gortva (Hungarian: Gortvakisfalud) is a village and municipality in the Rimavská Sobota District of the Banská Bystrica Region of southern Slovakia.

== Geography ==
The municipality lies at an altitude of 187 metres (614 ft) and covers an area of 9.63 km^{2} (3.72 sq mi) (2025).

== History ==
In historical records, the village was first mentioned in 1326 (1326 Gurtuatu, 1383 Kisfalud), when it belonged to Feledy feudatories. In the 16th century, it suffered Turkish devastations. From 1938 to 1944, it was annexed by Hungary.

== Population ==
Population statistic (10 years)
Year	1995	2005	2015	2025
Count	426	517	531	474
Difference		+21.36%	+2.70%	−10.73%

Population statistic
Year	2024	2025
Count	472	474
Difference		+0.42%

It has a population of 474 people (31 December 2025).

=== Ethnicity ===
Census 2021 (1+ %)
Ethnicity	Number	Fraction
Hungarian	347	72.59%
Slovak	126	26.35%
Romani	65	13.59%
Not found out	17	3.55%
Total	478	

In year 2021 was 478 people by ethnicity 347 as Hungarian, 126 as Slovak, 65 as Romani, 17 as Not found out, 4 as Czech, 1 as Ukrainian, 1 as Other and 1 as French.

Note on population: The difference values of population numbers in the table "Population statistic" and in the sections "Ethnicity" & "Religion" is caused by the use of various statistical methods.

=== Religion ===
Census 2021 (1+ %)
Religion	Number	Fraction
Roman Catholic Church	341	71.34%
None	87	18.2%
Not found out	28	5.86%
Calvinist Church	12	2.51%
Total	478	

In year 2021 was 478 people by religion 341 from Roman Catholic Church, 87 from None, 28 from Not found out, 12 from Calvinist Church, 3 from Evangelical Church, 2 from Greek Catholic Church, 1 from Old Catholic Church, 1 from Eastern Orthodox Church, 1 from Jehovah's Witnesses, 1 from Buddhism and 1 from Ad hoc movements.

== Genealogical resources ==
The records for genealogical research are available at the state archive "Statny Archiv in Banska Bystrica, Slovakia"

- Roman Catholic church records (births/marriages/deaths): 1762-1897 (parish B)
- Reformated church records (births/marriages/deaths): 1786-1863 (parish A)

== See also ==
- List of municipalities and towns in Slovakia
