= Apatovec =

Coordinates: 46°09′00″N 16°34′20″E

- Village
- Interactive map of Apatovec
- Country: Croatia
- County: Koprivnica-Križevci
- Municipality: Križevci

Area
  - Total: 12.4 km^{2} (4.8 sq mi)

Population (2021)
  - Total: 287
  - Density: 23.1/km^{2} (59.9/sq mi)
- Time zone: UTC+1 (CET)
  - Summer (DST): UTC+2 (CEST)

Apatovec is a village in Croatia.
