= Karakó =

- Coat of arms

- Location of Karakó in Hungary
- Coordinates: 47.11620°N 17.19991°E
- Country: Hungary
- Region: Western Transdanubia
- County: Vas
- Subregion: Celldömölki
- Rank: Village

Area
  - Total: 10.35 km^{2} (4.00 sq mi)

Population (1 January 2008)
  - Total: 202
  - Density: 19.5/km^{2} (50.5/sq mi)
- Time zone: UTC+1 (CET)
  - Summer (DST): UTC+2 (CEST)
- Postal code: 9547
- Area code: +36 95
- KSH code: 10913

Karakó is a village in Vas county, Hungary.

== Etymology ==
The name comes from Slavic Krakov, see also Krakov (Czech Republic), Kraków (Poland) or Krakovany (Slovakia). 1156/1412 in parochia Crocoyensy.
