= Obrovnica =

- Village
- Location within Croatia
- Coordinates: 45.8296098°N 16.8671818°E
- Country: Croatia
- County: Bjelovar-Bilogora County
- Municipality: Bjelovar

Area
  - Total: 1.9 sq mi (4.8 km^{2})

Population (2021)
  - Total: 155
  - Density: 84/sq mi (32/km^{2})
- Time zone: UTC+1 (CET)
  - Summer (DST): UTC+2 (CEST)

Obrovnica is a village in Croatia.

== Demographics ==
According to the 2021 census, its population was 155.
