= Dabronc =

- Flag Coat of arms

- Location of Dabronc in Hungary
- Coordinates: 47.0314°N 17.168°E
- Country: Hungary
- Region: Central Transdanubia
- County: Veszprém

Area
  - Total: 20.27 km^{2} (7.83 sq mi)

Population (2012)
  - Total: 406
  - Density: 20.0/km^{2} (51.9/sq mi)
- Time zone: UTC+1 (CET)
  - Summer (DST): UTC+2 (CEST)
- Postal code: 8345
- Area code: +36 87
- Website: http://dabronc.hu/

Dabronc is a village in Veszprém county, Hungary.
