= Slanje =

- Village
- Location of Slanje in Croatia
- Coordinates: 46°14′N 16°33′E
- Country: Croatia
- County: Varaždin County
- Municipality: Martijanec

Area
  - Total: 18.2 km^{2} (7.0 sq mi)

Population (2021)
  - Total: 397
  - Density: 21.8/km^{2} (56.5/sq mi)
- Time zone: UTC+1 (CET)
  - Summer (DST): UTC+2 (CEST)
- Postal code: 42230 Ludbreg
- Area code: +385 (0)42

Slanje is a village in Croatia. It is connected by the D24 highway.
