= Pakod =

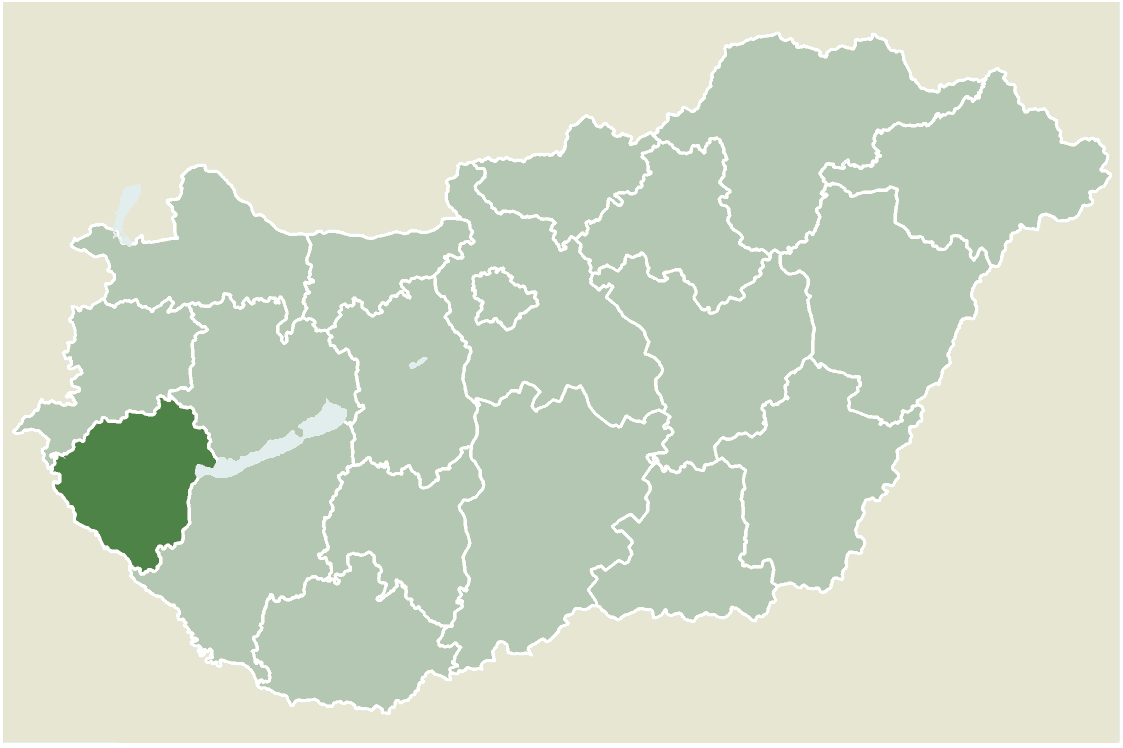
- Location of Zala county in Hungary

- Location of Pakod
- Coordinates: 46.95793°N 17.00032°E
- Country: Hungary
- County: Zala

Area
  - Total: 12.55 km^{2} (4.85 sq mi)

Population (2004)
  - Total: 988
  - Density: 78.72/km^{2} (203.9/sq mi)
- Time zone: UTC+1 (CET)
  - Summer (DST): UTC+2 (CEST)
- Postal code: 8799
- Area code: 83

Pakod is a village in Zala County, Hungary.

The time zone used there is CEST (Central European Standard Time).

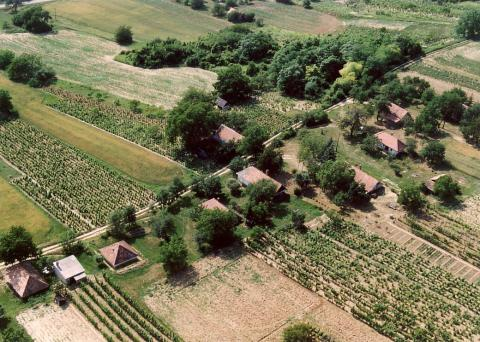
Aerial photography of Pakod
