= Bagod =

- Village
- Flag Coat of arms

- Location of Bagod
- Coordinates: 46.885261°N 16.743939°E
- Country: Hungary
- Region: Western Transdanubia
- County: Zala
- District: Zalaegerszeg

Area
  - Total: 16.39 km^{2} (6.33 sq mi)

Population (1 January 2025)
  - Total: 1,186
  - Density: 72.36/km^{2} (187.4/sq mi)
- Time zone: UTC+1 (CET)
  - Summer (DST): UTC+2 (CEST)
- Postal code: 8992
- Area code: (+36) 92
- Website: bagod.hu

Bagod is a proposed village in Zala County, Hungary.
