= Türje =

- Flag Coat of arms

- Location of Türje in Hungary
- Coordinates: 46°58′55″N 17°6′19″E
- Country: Hungary
- Region: Western Transdanubia
- County: Zala
- Subregion: Zalaszentgróti
- Rank: Village

Area
  - Total: 38.24 km^{2} (14.76 sq mi)

Population (1 January 2008)
  - Total: 1,774
  - Density: 46.39/km^{2} (120.2/sq mi)
- Time zone: UTC+1 (CET)
  - Summer (DST): UTC+2 (CEST)
- Postal code: 8796
- Area code: +36 83
- KSH code: 12609
- Website: www.turje.hu

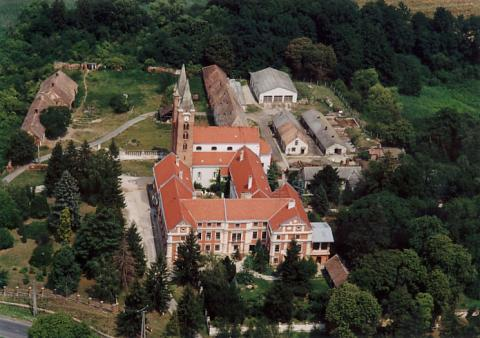
Türje monastery: aerial view

Türje is a village in Zala County, Hungary. The village is located in the North-Eastern part of Zala County, near the great turn of Zala river, between the Keszthelyi Mountains and Kemeneshát Hills. The village has a railway station on the line of the Boba–Őrihodos railway which is connecting the two local centers of Zalaegerszeg and Celldömölk. It is also connected with Zalaszentgrót by bus.

== History ==
The foundation of the village may go back to the 10th century. The monastery of the Premonstratensian monks was founded at the beginning of the 13th century. In the old charters, the village was mentioned in 1234. In this time, the Türje genera was the landowner of the village and the neighboring villages too. The provostry was a basic administrative center between 1268 and 1358. Its role in the economic transportations between Buda and Venezia gave emphasis to the development of the village in the 14th century.

Turks destroyed the village in 1532. Later the village received the status of oppidum, with merchant town rights 1535. In 1566, the troops of Sümeg occupied the monastery and burned the church. The bishop of Veszprém rebuilt the monastery as a fortress against the Turks in the long wars of the 16th century. During the last attack of the Turks against Vienna, Törje become deserted by the Turkish army.

In the rebuilding period of the late 1690s, Türje again received the rights of the oppidium town in 1703. In the Rákóczi freedom fights, Türje was a base for the kuruc (Hungarian) troops. For this reason, the Austrian general Rabutin burned the village again in 1707.

In the years of 1720, the premontre monks returned; however, they were governed from two Austrian monasteries of Pernegg and Hradisch. Finally, the monastery became independent in 1802. In this period, the monastery was the landowner of the village.

The railway construction of the late 19th century gave impetus to the development of the village.

== Tourism ==
The main tourist attractions in Türje are the monastery and the Romanesque church. Türje become famous for the discovery of the medieval murals of the Saint Ladislaus legend on the northern walls of the church. After Tereske, Ócsa, and Vizsoly, this church is the fourth most important place where medieval frescoes can be found.

== Sister towns ==
- Joseni, Romania

== Outer links ==
- Türje Village homepage
- Türje in the Vendégváró homepage
- Aerial photographs of Türje
