= Conrad Szák =

13th-century Hungarian noble

Conrad (I) Szák

Ispán of Győr
- Reign: 1264–1267
- Predecessor: Lawrence, son of Kemény
- Successor: Selke
- Died: after 1269
- Noble family: gens Szák
- Issue: John I Conrad II
- Father: Albeus

Conrad (I) from the kindred Szák (Hungarian: Szák nembeli (I.) Konrád; died after 1269) was a Hungarian noble in the 13th century, who served as ispán of Győr County from 1264 to 1267.

== Family and career ==
Conrad (I) was born into the gens (clan) Szák as the only known son of Albeus. The kindred possessed lands in Central Transdanubia, primarily in Tolna and Komárom counties, centered around the namesake estate Szák. Conrad had two sons, John (I) and Conrad (II). The Várongi noble family, which became extinct in the first third of the 15th century, descended from John.

Conrad is first mentioned by a royal charter of King Béla IV of Hungary in May 1240, when he already served as Cup-bearer of the Queen's Court. The document narrates that when Queen Maria Laskarina gave birth to Stephen, the firstborn son of the royal couple sometime around October 1239, Conrad hurried to the royal court in order to inform Béla IV of the birth of his son. As a result, the king donated the village of Podár in Veszprém County (today a wasteland near Dáka) to Conrad. The land was separated from the royal caste lordship of Sopron. His relative, Herrand Szák (son of Nicholas Szák) died without male descendants sometime before 1250, thus his possessions escheated to the Crown. Béla IV granted three of his former estates – Terjén, Gyalán and Várong – to Conrad in April 1250, with the consent of Queen Maria. Former historiographical works incorrectly claimed that Conrad Szák functioned as Master of the stewards in the queenly court in 1253. In fact, his namesake contemporary, Conrad Győr held this dignity in that year.

He served as ispán of Győr County from around 1264 to 1267. His relative, Pousa Szák bequeathed his estate in Bere (laid in present-day Márkó) in Veszprém County to Conrad in 1269.

== Sources ==
- Karácsonyi, János (1901). A magyar nemzetségek a XIV. század közepéig. III. kötet [The Hungarian genera until the middle of the 14th century, Vol. 3] (in Hungarian). Hungarian Academy of Sciences.
- Zsoldos, Attila (2005). Az Árpádok és asszonyaik. A királynéi intézmény az Árpádok korában [The Árpáds and their Women: The Institution of Queenship in the Era of the Árpáds] (in Hungarian). MTA Történettudományi Intézete. ISBN 963-8312-98-X.
- Zsoldos, Attila (2011). Magyarország világi archontológiája, 1000–1301 [Secular Archontology of Hungary, 1000–1301] (in Hungarian). História, MTA Történettudományi Intézete. ISBN 978-963-9627-38-3.

Conrad I Genus Szák Born: ? Died: after 1269
Political offices
| Preceded by Lawrence | Ispán of Győr; 1264–1267 | Succeeded by Selke |
