= Nicholas Szák =

Hungarian baron

Palatine of Hungary
- Reign: 1219–1222; 1226
- Predecessor: Julius Kán (1st and 2nd term)
- Successor: Theodore Csanád (1st term); Denis, son of Ampud (2nd term)
- Died: March 1241
- Noble family: gens Szák
- Issue: Herrand
- Father: Barc

Nicholas from the kindred Szák (Hungarian: Szák nembeli Miklós; died March 1241) was a powerful Hungarian baron in the first decades of the 13th century. As a confidant of King Andrew II, he served as Palatine of Hungary from 1219 to 1222 and for a brief period in 1226. During his first term, he initiated a comprehensive reform of the judicial system.

He lost political influence when King Béla IV ascended the Hungarian throne in 1235. Nicholas was killed on the eve of the First Mongol invasion of Hungary in March 1241, confronting the Cumans, who decided to leave Hungary and destroyed many villages on their way towards the Balkan Peninsula after the assassination of their khan Köten.

== Early life and career ==
Nicholas was born into the Gyalán branch of the gens (clan) Szák, which possessed lands in Central Transdanubia, primarily in Tolna and Komárom counties, centered around the namesake estate Szák. He was the only known son of Barc. Nicholas' marriage with an unidentified noblewoman produced a son Herrand, who died without male descendants prior to 1250.

His early career is highly uncertain depending on the identification of those contemporary namesake lords, who held court offices around the same period during the reign of Andrew II. Earlier historiographical works – e.g. Mór Wertner – considered Nicholas Szák served as Judge royal from 1208 to 1210 and ispán of Pozsony County from 1211 to 1212, but historian Attila Zsoldos attributed these positions to another Nicholas. Nicholas Szák, in fact, was first referred to as count (or judge) of the court of Queen consort Gertrude of Merania in 1213, shortly before her assassination. Beside that, he also functioned as ispán of Győr County. According to a non-authentic charter, Nicholas held both dignities already in 1212. Nicholas participated in the Fifth Crusade under the command of Andrew II from the summer of 1217. While the majority of the contingent returned to Hungary in early 1218, Nicholas remained in the Holy Land for a while and took part in the Siege of Damietta, along with bishops Peter of Győr and Simon of Várad.

== Palatine of Hungary ==
When he returned to Hungary, Andrew found his kingdom in the state of anarchy, both royal governor John, Archbishop of Esztergom and Palatine Julius Kán proved to be incapable to prevent the spread of looting and chaotic conditions. As a result, Andrew II dismissed Julius Kán from his position. Sometime before June 1219, Nicholas Szák, who returned home by that time, was appointed Palatine of Hungary. He held the dignity until 1222. Beside that, he also functioned as ispán of Sopron County between 1219 and 1224. Thereafter, this county became the place of his activity and aspiration to acquire wealth.

The appointment of Nicholas Szák resulted series of structural reforms in the institutional system of the palatinal court. Historian Tibor Szőcs argued Nicholas Szák professionalized the previously ad-hoc institution, which until then had operated in accordance with the habitus of the incumbent office-holder. It is plausible that, the permanent deputy position, the so-called vice-palatine was created during his term. The earliest charters referring to the palatines' deputies mentioned them under several names, including vicarius palatini (in 1220 and 1221), and vicecomes palatini comitis and viceiudex palatini comitis (in 1221). Nicholas' first deputies were File Szeretvai (possibly), Petus, Maurice Pok and Martin, they plausibly simultaneously held their positions. The same documents, all preserved in the Regestrum Varadinense suggest that the palatine and his deputies administered justice during the same period but in faraway territories: while Palatine Nicholas Szák heard cases in the lands east of the river Tisza (mostly Abaúj, Heves and Szolnok counties), his deputies worked in Transdanubia in 1220. This practice was obviously unpopular, because the Golden Bull of 1222 explicitly stated that the palatine "shall have no deputy judge except for the one at his own court". The Golden Bull of 1231 also stipulated that the palatine could have a single deputy. According to a 1219 verdict, Nicholas judged in the presence of a forum of udvornici in the district Kemej. However it cannot be consider as a precursor of the subsequent palatinal assemblies (Latin: generalis congregatio). Royal udvornici were traditionally administered by the palatine. Nicholas was entrusted to supervise the former royal grants to them in 1220–1221. However, upon the request of Andrew II, Nicholas also judged over ecclesiastical udvornici of Esztergom in 1221. It is plausible that the Pechenegs of Nagyhalom in Fejér County also belonged to his jurisdiction in the same year.

The process of regular issuance of letters of conviction in the palatinal court also began during his term – previously, other institutions, such as the royal chancellery or places of authentication recorded the content of the judicial decision in writing if litigants requested. The first such charter preserved from the year 1219 during a lawsuit in which the litigant Abbot Uros of Pannonhalma requested that the judgment be recorded in writing. Nicholas issued the first surviving palatine diploma in 1220, also containing a verdict which the Pannonhalma Abbey was involved. In the next year, Nicholas also issued a charter regarding the division of lands between the members of the clan Ják. Altogether eleven of Nicholas' charters have survived in total, together with the mention of eight additional charters and letters. The transition is characterized by the fact that permanent scribes did not work under Nicholas at that time: a paleographic examination of his five surviving original charters shows that those are the works of five different clerks. It is presumable that where Nicholas was just judging, a scribe of a nearby place of authentication or monastery issued the "ad hoc" diplomas. In his documents, Nicholas used the method of chirograph. In order to authenticate the documents, Nicholas used regular, double seals and signet ring, but his seal itself has not survived. Still, Nicholas had no permanent professional staff. For instance, in 1226, when it was necessary to establish the authenticity of a diploma, he sought the assistance of Robert, Archbishop of Esztergom and other clergy.

== Confidant of Andrew II ==
By the early 1220s, Nicholas Szák became one of the staunchest confidants of King Andrew II, who adopted "new institutions" and distributed large portions of the royal domain – royal castles and all estates attached to them – as inheritable grants to his supporters. Nicholas was one of the beneficiary courtiers at this time. Sometime around 1220, Nicholas was granted with a right of inheritance the whole territory of the ispánate of Locsmánd (Luchman, today Lutzmannsburg), located in Sopron County along the border with Austria, and its accessories, including the fortified castle of Lánzsér (present-day Landsee, part of Markt Sankt Martin in Austria). There are assumptions that Nicholas Szák built the fortress of Lánzsér based on the crusader castles in the Holy Land. Prior to 1222, Nicholas exchanged his villages Veperd and Kislók (present-day Weppersdorf and Unterfrauenhaid in Austria, respectively) with his king for unidentified landholdings in Sopron County. The monarch donated the two settlements to Pousa Szák in 1222, because of his imprisonment in "Greek land", when hurried before the king returning from the Holy Land in 1218.

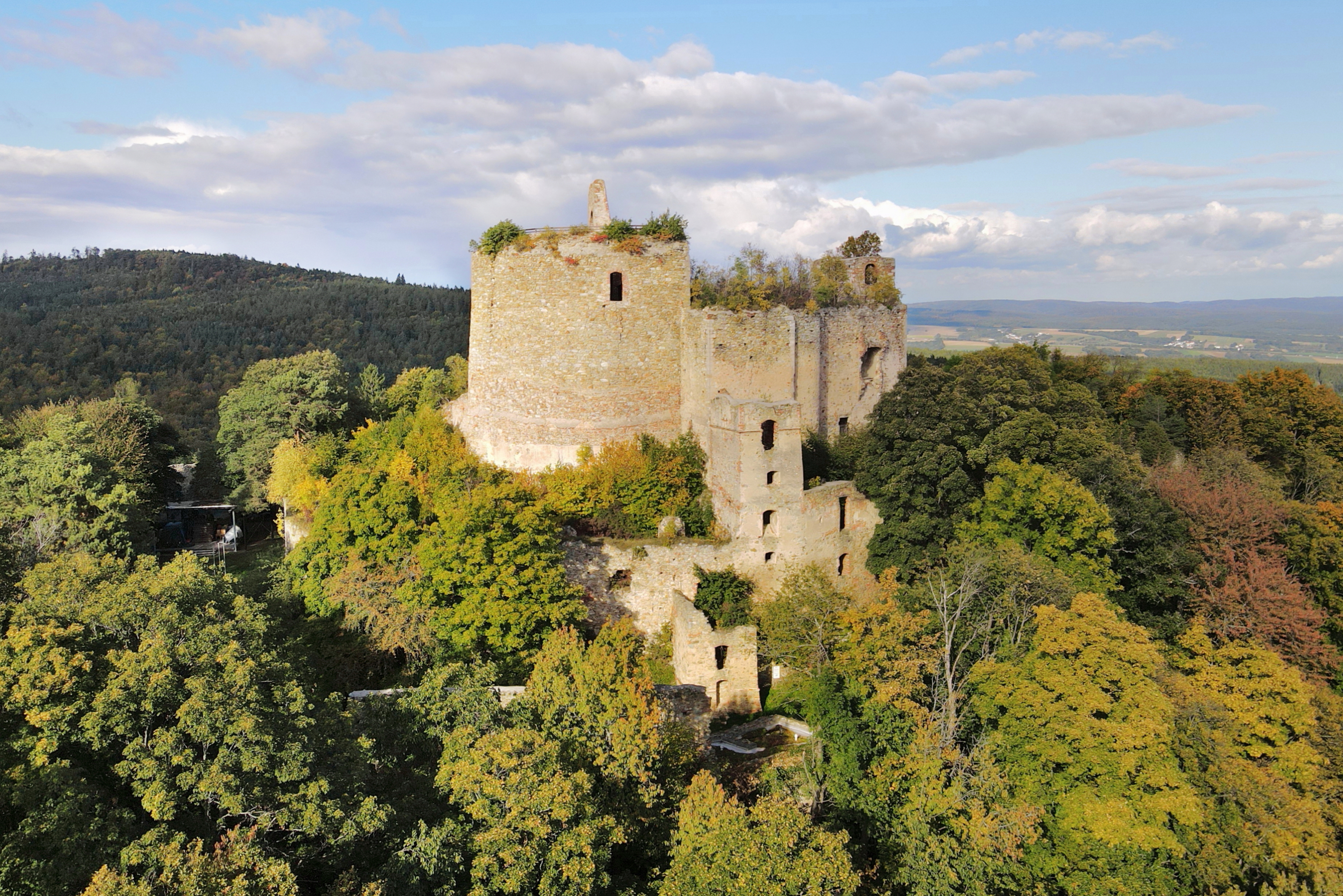
The Burgruine Landsee (Lánzsér), possibly built by Nicholas Szák in the 1220–1230s

The conflict between Andrew II and some powerful magnates had emerged by early 1222. A letter of 1222 of Pope Honorius III reveals that "some wicked men" had forced Andrew II to share his realms with his heir, Duke Béla, who became the internal opposition of his father's rule thereafter. The available data suggest that discontented barons, many of whom had held high offices during Emeric's reign, staged a coup d'état in the spring of 1222. Andrew was forced to dismiss his confidants from the most important courtly positions, including Nicholas Szák, who was replaced as Palatine by Theodore Csanád, a leading figure of the 1222 movement. The monarch was also forced to issue the Golden Bull. Despite Andrew II regained control over the royal council in the second half of 1222, he did not reinstate Nicholas to the position of palatine. It is possible he returned to the Holy Land to fight against the Ayyubid Sultanate, because Pope Honorius instructed Ugrin Csák, Archbishop of Kalocsa to protect his family and wealth in his absence on behalf of the Holy See in December 1223. While retaining his office in Sopron County until 1224, Nicholas became count (judge) of the court of Queen Yolanda of Courtenay from 1222 to 1225, a relatively more insignificant dignity. He also served as ispán of Pozsony County for a brief time in 1224.

Nicholas was again made Palatine of Hungary for a brief time in 1226. Beside that, he administered Sopron County in the same year. This one-year service also reflected a relative frequency of diploma issuance compared to his contemporaries. He judged over a lawsuit concerning Csurgó and Zákány in Somogy County. His permanent pristaldus ("bailiff") was Budimir from the gens Budmér in that period. Nicholas was succeeded as palatine by Denis, son of Ampud in early 1227 at the latest. Nicholas gradually lost influence in the royal court for the remaining part of Andrew's rule, while Julius Kán and Denis dominated the government. It is possible he is identical with that Nicholas, who was styled as Master of the horse between 1228 and 1230. If this assumption is correct, he also functioned as ispán (count) for the stablemen (Hungarian: lovászispán; Latin: comes agasonum) simultaneously from 1228 to 1229, and ispán of Sopron County in 1230. In 1228, Duke Béla's supporters took power in the royal council after another wave of dissatisfaction. Andrew was forced to authorize his son to revise his previous land grants throughout Hungary. According to a charter from 1230, Andrew II delegated Nicholas to that committee composed of Duke Béla and his partisans, which investigated cases in Sopron County. A non-authentic charter refers to Nicholas as count of the queenly court in 1232. He was styled as ispán of Sopron County in 1233. In this capacity, he was entrusted to investigate and supervise possessed inheritable lands "without royal grants" in the county. When Andrew II concluded an agreement with the Holy See in August–September 1233, Nicholas' name was among those of the dignitaries who swore on the document, which is a good indication of his high prestige in the royal court, even though he no longer held court dignity at that time.

== Later life and death ==
However, when Bishop Bulcsú of Csanád and Nicholas son of Barc, together with many noblemen, tried to move their wives, sons, daughters and servants to upper Hungary and then quickly join the king's army, they were confronted by Cumans and fought very hard with them. Unable to resist them, almost all perished by the sword.

— Master Roger's Epistle to the Sorrowful Lament upon the Destruction of the Kingdom of Hungary by the Tatars

After the death of Andrew II, his son Béla IV ascended the Hungarian throne in September 1235. Nicholas became disgraced and completely lost political influence, while some of his landholdings along the border with Austria were confiscated, but he was able to avoid imprisonment or execution, unlike Denis, son of Ampud or Julius Kán. Nevertheless, he was convicted of "high treason". According to a letter of Béla IV to Pope Gregory IX around August 1236, Nicholas – along with former treasurer Nicholas and Mika the Bearded – usurped much of the crown revenues and deposited it with local churches. Nicholas was later pardoned, but his person remained in obscure for the upcoming years.

The Mongols broke through the barricades erected in the Verecke Pass (Veretsky Pass, Ukraine) and invaded the Kingdom of Hungary on 12 March 1241. When the citizens of Pest realized the presence of Cumans in the invading army, mass hysteria emerged. The townsfolk accused their leader Köten and their Cumans of cooperating with the enemy. A riot broke out and the mob massacred Köten and his retinue on 17 March 1241. On hearing about Köten's fate, the Cumans decided to leave Hungary. Nicholas was among those nobles in Transdanubia, who attempted to join the royal army in order to clash with the advancing Mongols. However their troops, led by Bulcsú Lád, the Bishop of Csanád and Nicholas Szák were confronted by the fleeing Cumans, who looted and destroyed many villages on their way towards the Balkan Peninsula. Their army crossed the marauders in the central parts of the kingdom, where the Cumans perished them. Nicholas was killed in the skirmish, while the bishop could narrowly escape.

Following Nicholas' death, his only son Herrand became the lord of Locsmánd. However he died soon without male descendants, prior to 1250 (but most plausibly before 1245). The castle district of Locsmánd escheated to the Crown thereafter. Following a temporary possession by Queen Maria Laskarina, Béla IV granted three of Herrand's former estates – Terjén, Gyalán and Várong – to a distant relative Conrad Szák in April 1250. The Hungarian king granted the lordship of Locsmánd to his confidant Lawrence Aba in 1263.

== Sources ==
=== Primary sources ===
- Master Roger's Epistle to the Sorrowful Lament upon the Destruction of the Kingdom of Hungary by the Tatars (Translated and Annotated by János M. Bak and Martyn Rady) (2010). In: Rady, Martyn; Veszprémy, László; Bak, János M. (2010); Anonymus and Master Roger; CEU Press; ISBN 978-9639776951.

=== Secondary sources ===
- Borosy, András (1996). "A keresztes háborúk és Magyarország, II. rész [The Crusades and the Hungarian Kingdom, Part II]". Hadtörténelmi Közlemények (in Hungarian). 109 (2): 11–54. ISSN 0017-6540.
- Engel, Pál (1996). Magyarország világi archontológiája, 1301–1457, I [Secular Archontology of Hungary, 1301–1457, Volume I] (in Hungarian). História, MTA Történettudományi Intézete. ISBN 963-8312-44-0.
- Kristó, Gyula (1969). "A locsmándi várispánság és felbomlása [The Royal Castle Ispánate of Locsmánd and its Dissolution]". Soproni Szemle (in Hungarian). 23 (2). Soproni Városszépítő Egyesület: 131–144. ISSN 0133-0748.
- Markó, László (2006). A magyar állam főméltóságai Szent Istvántól napjainkig: Életrajzi Lexikon [Great Officers of State in Hungary from King Saint Stephen to Our Days: A Biographical Encyclopedia] (in Hungarian). Helikon Kiadó. ISBN 963-208-970-7.
- Nógrády, Árpád (1995). ""Magistratus et comitatus tenetibus". II. András kormányzati rendszerének kérdéséhez ["Magistratus et comitatus tenetibus". To the Question of Andrew II's System of Government]". Századok (in Hungarian). 129 (1). Magyar Történelmi Társulat: 157–194. ISSN 0039-8098.
- Szőcs, Tibor (2010). "A nádori oklevéladás kezdeti szakasza [The Initial Stage of the Palatinal Diploma]". In Almási, Tibor; Révész, Éva; Szabados, György (eds.). "Fons, skepsis, lex": Ünnepi tanulmányok a 70 esztendős Makk Ferenc tiszteletére (in Hungarian). Szegedi Középkorász Műhely. pp. 429–437. ISBN 978-963-30-6073-5.
- Szőcs, Tibor (2014). A nádori intézmény korai története, 1000–1342 [An Early History of the Palatinal Institution: 1000–1342] (in Hungarian). Magyar Tudományos Akadémia Támogatott Kutatások Irodája. ISBN 978-963-508-697-9.
- Zsoldos, Attila (2011a). Magyarország világi archontológiája, 1000–1301 [Secular Archontology of Hungary, 1000–1301] (in Hungarian). História, MTA Történettudományi Intézete. ISBN 978-963-9627-38-3.
- Zsoldos, Attila (2011b). "II. András Aranybullája [Andrew II's Golden Bull]". Történelmi Szemle (in Hungarian). LIII (1): 1–38. ISSN 0040-9634.

Nicholas Genus Szák Born: ? Died: March 1241
Political offices
| Preceded by Bánk Bár-Kalán | Count of the Queen's Court; 1213 | Succeeded by Atyusz Atyusz |
| Preceded by Julius Kán | Palatine of Hungary; 1219–1222 | Succeeded by Theodore Csanád |
| Preceded by Julius Kán | Count of the Queen's Court; 1222–1225 | Succeeded by Atyusz Atyusz |
| Preceded by Julius Kán | Palatine of Hungary; 1226 | Succeeded by Denis |
| Preceded by Michael Bána | Master of the horse 1228–1230 | Succeeded by Michael Bána |
