= Benedict, son of Korlát =

Hungarian nobleman

- Dux

Voivode of Transylvania
- Reign: 1202–1206; 1208–1209
- Predecessor: Nicholas I (1st term); Smaragd (2nd term)
- Successor: Smaragd (1st term); Michael Kacsics (2nd term)
- Died: after 1221
- Spouse: Tota
- Father: Korlát

Benedict, son of Korlát (Hungarian: Korlát fia Benedek; died after 1221) was a Hungarian nobleman, who served as voivode of Transylvania twice, from 1202 to 1206 and 1208 to 1209. He was styled as "dux" by royal charters – the first one who is not a relative of the royal Árpád dynasty –, which indicated his high social prestige. Due to the lack of sources and the presence of multiple barons named Benedict in the period simultaneously, there are a number of difficulties in drawing and defining his career path.

There are assumptions, he is identical with Benedict "the Antichrist" and/or Benedict "the Bald", who governed the Principality of Halych on behalf of the Hungarian monarch Andrew II in 1209–1210 and 1214–1221, respectively. This governor, considering the two as one person, is also referred to as Benedikt Bor in Russian and Ukrainian historiography. This article, regardless of whether both, or either, or neither can be identified with Benedict, son of Korlát, additionally also deals with the careers of the two governors of Halych based on available data.

== Early career ==
The origin of Benedict is uncertain. His father was Korlát. This name was a Hungarian variant of Conrad. Consequently, historian Menyhért Érdújhelyi considered Benedict was of German origin and migrated to the Kingdom of Hungary from the Holy Roman Empire. According to this theory, Benedict inherited his imperial title of dux from his father. Until the early 19th century, historians incorrectly assumed the identity of the two names Benedict and Bánk (Banco). Therefore, the person of Benedict, son of Korlát was also identified with Bánk Bár-Kalán, a powerful lord and alleged mastermind behind the assassination of Queen Gertrude of Merania in 1213. As a result, playwright and poet József Katona, who wrote the Hungarian historical tragedy Bánk bán in 1819, called Bánk as "the son of Conrad" and modeled his fictional wife Melinda on the "beautiful" court lady Tota. According to historian Márta Font, Benedict belonged to the gens (clan) Bár-Kalán. In the late 19th century, Hungarian historian Antal Pór also identified Benedict, son of Korlát with Bánk Bár-Kalán, but his claim was rejected by several contemporary scholars, including Mór Wertner, Gyula Pauler and János Karácsonyi. Benedict possessed landholdings in the northern counties of Transdanubia.

"In addition, Queen Constance brought with her a girl called Tota, the sister of Count Simon and Count Bertram. She was exceedingly beautiful, so fair, indeed, that scarcely any woman in the world in those days was considered her like. This girl was given in marriage to Duke Benedict, son of Conrad, and her dowry was the town of Martinsdorf, a gift from King Emeric and Queen Constance."
Simon of Kéza: The Deeds of the Hungarians

It is plausible his career started during the last regnal years of Béla III of Hungary. Subsequently, he was a confidant of King Emeric. Presumably, he is identical with that Benedict, who served as ispán of Nyitra County (1198), Ban of Slavonia and ispán of Zala County (1199–1200), according to historian Tamás Kádár. In contrast, Attila Zsoldos considered, that Benedict was made Ban of Slavonia in a fierce political situation during the struggle between Emeric and his younger brother Andrew. In this context, the career of this Benedict did not continue after Andrew's ascension to the Hungarian throne in 1205. Zsoldos attributed this career to other Benedict, who served as Palatine of Hungary from 1202 to 1204. Benedict, son of Korlát was installed Voivode of Transylvania in 1202. Gyula Pauler derived Benedict's title of dux from this dignity, as well as Tamás Kádár. Mór Wertner considered his title was a precursor of those bans of Slavonia, who were also styled as "dukes" during the reign of Béla IV of Hungary.

Around 1201 or 1202, Benedict married Tota, a lady-in-waiting of Queen Constance from Aragon. She arrived to Hungary as a member of the entourage of the queen, who became the wife of Emeric in 1198. Upon the request of Benedict, the king gave his permission to the voivode to bestow his two settlements, Bajót in Esztergom County and Nagymarton/Martinsdorf in Sopron County (today in Burgenland, Austria, by its present–day name Mattersburg) on Tota, as a morning gift or dower. Beside Emeric's permission, Queen Constance succeeded in getting the king to grant the land of Nagymarton an exemption from royal taxes. This is also the earliest extant prenuptial agreement of a nobleman in Hungary. Tota's elder brothers, Simon and Bertrand (Bertram) followed their sister to Hungary during the reign of Andrew II. The prestigious Nagymartoni (also known as Bajóti, and later Fraknói) family – which established its wealth based on Benedict's two domains in Transdanubia – descended from Simon and flourished until the first half of the 15th century. Benedict and Tota had no children. Toru Senga suggested Benedict adopted the honorary title of dux after this marriage. Péter Molnár also argued the dux title is mentioned in this form due to the rhetorical nature of the 1221 diploma, which reflects the informal influence and social esteem of his wife Tota.

== Confidant of Andrew II ==
Benedict retained his influence and the dignity of voivode even after Andrew II ascended the Hungarian throne in 1205. Tamás Kádár considered Benedict swore loyalty to Andrew already in 1204, months before the death of Emeric, and supported the duke's aspirations against the pro-Emeric lords during the nominal reign of the child Ladislaus III. He functioned as Voivode of Transylvania until 1206, when he was replaced by Smaragd. According to Slovak historian Angelika Herucová, it is possible that Benedict is identical with that namesake noble, who served as ispán of Bodrog (1205), Sopron (1206–1208), Újvár (1209), then Ung (1214) counties. Initially, Zsoldos, in contrast, distinguished the two noblemen, considering the involvement of Benedict, son of Korlát in the conspiracy against Andrew II in 1209. Later, he modified his standpoint, accepting identification regarding the post-1209 career of Benedict.

Benedict again served as Voivode of Transylvania from 1208 to 1209. According to a subsequent royal charter of Andrew II from 1223, a territory to the Kerc Abbey (present-day Cârța, Romania) was formerly awarded to the Cistercians by magister Gocelinus through "our loyal and beloved Benedict, former voivode". Kádár expressed his doubts regarding this second term can also be linked to Benedict, son of Korlát, because of the aforementioned charter from 1223, where the king called one former voivode Benedict as his "faithful" partisan, which is in contrast to a statement two years earlier mentioning his exile.

=== "The Antichrist" ===
"Upon learning of the disorder and revolt in Galicia [the Hungarian] King Andrew [II] sent Benedict with an army [there]. Benedict captured [Prince] Roman [Igorevič] as he was bathing in a bath-house and sent him to Hungary. [...] In Galicia there was a very wise bibliophile named Timofej from Kiev. He expressed himself allegorically about this tormentor Benedict: ‚In our time the Antichrist will be known by three names‘ and then fled from him, for [the latter] tortured boyars and citizens alike and was addicted to lechery. [He and his soldiers] defiled married women, nuns, and the wives of priests. And indeed he was the Antichrist for his horrendous deeds bore witness thereof."
Galician–Volhynian Chronicle (1210)

During his reign, Andrew II was intensely interested in the internal affairs of his former principality of Halych. He launched his first campaign to recapture Halych in 1205 or 1206. Taking advantage of a conflict between Roman II Igorevich and his boyars, Andrew sent troops to Halych under the command of a certain Benedict, who captured Roman Igorevich and occupied the principality in 1208 or 1209. Benedict sent Roman as a prisoner to Hungary. Instead of appointing a new prince, Andrew made Benedict governor of Halych. Benedict "tortured boyars and was addicted to lechery", according to the Galician–Volhynian Chronicle. Benedict intended to incorporate the Orthodox church of Halych into Hungary's ecclesiastical structure. The boyars offered the throne to Mstislav Mstislavich, Prince of Novgorod, if he could overthrow Benedict. Mstislav Mstislavich invaded Halych, but he could not defeat Benedict. Roman Igorevich reconciled with his brother, Vladimir Igorevich, in early 1209 or 1210. Their united forces vanquished Benedict's army, expelling the Hungarians from Halych.

This Benedict was frequently called as "Antichrist" by the Galician–Volhynian Chronicle because of the oppressive nature of his rule in Halych. The chronicler labelled Benedict with this curse through the words of Timofej, a victim of his torture. In Russian chronicle tradition, "Antichrist" was a label, which designated someone who used his political power against "God and the faithful". Soviet historian A. I. Hensorskyj argued that Benedict, in the eyes of the Rus' people, was indeed the Antichrist on the numerical value of the latter's name in its Greek pronunciation (Benediktos): the number 666 was the sum of the total number of tones in his name.

Several historians identified this governor with Benedict, son of Korlát. Historian Gyula Pauler was the first to do so, and dated the events between the years 1208 and 1209. Bálint Hóman accepted this consideration, and claimed that Voivode Benedict governed the Principality of Halych, bearing the title of dux. Gyula Kristó also shared this viewpoint in his early works. Initially, Attila Zsoldos – based on the work of Antal Hodinka, who did not modify the wrong chronology of the Galician–Volhynian Chronicle in his Hungarian translation – claimed Benedict, son of Korlát governed the principality between 1206 and 1208, and derived his title of dux from this status. Based on further researches, he, later, modified his standpoint: he argued Benedict, son of Korlát was governor at the turn of 1210 and 1211 and questioned his role in the 1209 rebellion. Instead, he assumed his role in the 1214 rebellion against Andrew II, when some barons forced the king to crown his eldest son, the child Béla. According to Ukrainian historian Vitaly Nagirny, the Hungarian campaign against Halych took place at the end of 1209, and Benedict ruled the province until the return of Roman II and Vladimir III Igorevich in the first half of 1210 (formerly, Mykhailo Hrushevsky put the date of the Hungarian rule to the years 1210–1211). Márta Font argued the Hungarian rule over Halych in this regard lasted from the second half of 1210 to the first half of 1211. Font also supposed a connection between Benedict's role in Halych and his title of dux. Slovak historian Marek Klatý, who accepted the claim that Benedict, son of Korlát was involved in the 1209 rebellion against Andrew II, considered that was soon pardoned by the king and could lead the Hungarian contingent against Roman Igorevich in the second half of 1210. He argued, his title (dux) refers to his role as military general in the war of Halych.

Other historians refused or questioned the identification, for instance Toru Senga, who also accepted the participation of Benedict, son of Korlát in the rebellion against Andrew II in 1209. He identified "the Antichrist" with that Benedict, who was styled as ispán of Újvár County in 1209; the royal campaign against Halych took place in the autumn of 1210, and this Benedict served as governor until the spring of 1211, according to him. Márta Font slightly accepted Senga's theory regarding the distinction between "the Antichrist" and Benedict, son of Korlát.

=== "The Bald" ===
"[...] Mstislav marched against Halyč upon Lestko's advice. [Thereupon] all the Galicians and Sudislav [pro-Hungarian lord] sent for Danilo. But Danilo could not come and Benedikt Lysyj [the Bald] together with Sudislav fled to Hungary. Consequently, Mstislav began to reign in Halyč."
Galician–Volhynian Chronicle (1210)

Andrew II installed his second son, the minor Coloman the ruler (prince, then king) of Halych (or Galicia) in 1214. According to the Galician–Volhynian Chronicle, a certain Benedict the Bald (lisy or lysy) was appointed to administer the principality on his behalf. According to Soviet historian Ocherki V. T. Pashuto, Benedict acted as head of the Hungarian garrison in Halych. Among others, Demetrius Aba and File Szeretvai also belonged to the Hungarian contingent. After Mstislav Mstislavich invaded Halych in 1219, with the assistance of Leszek the White, Coloman and his retinue – including Benedict – were forced to flee to Hungary.

Ocherki V. T. Pashuto and Mykhailo Hrushevsky identified this governor with Benedict, son of Korlát too. Toru Senga argued this Benedict "the Bald" could be identical with Benedict, son of Samud, who first appears in contemporary documents in Hungary from the 1210s. The historian also referred to a charter of vice-palatine Gothard from 1264, which mentions a certain Benedict "the Bald" from the gens (clan) Apc.

==== Question of their identity ====
Russian and Ukrainian historiography – e.g. Ocherki V. T. Pashuto and Mykhailo Hrushevsky – consider the two governors named Benedict ("the Antichrist" and "the Bald") to be a single person and usually refer to him "Benedikt (or Benedykt) Bor", although this epithet ("bor" = "wine") is not included in contemporary sources. Japanese–Hungarian historian Toru Senga discovered this can be traced to an error made by 19th-century Russian historian Sergey Solovyov, who – based on the work of Johann Christian von Engel – mistakenly identified Benedict with Palatine Bánk Bár-Kalán, who was involved in the assassination of Queen Gertrude of Merania in 1213. Numerous Polish historians also consider the two Benedict to be the same person. Slovak historians Nataša Procházková and Marek Klatý shared this opinion too. The latter also connected this person to Benedict, son of Korlát. Toru Senga also presumed identity between the two governors, but rejected the identification with Benedict, son of Korlát. He argued this hypothetical Benedict served as governor from 1210 to 1211, then ispán of Ung County in 1214, which laid along the route to Halych, before returning to the principality as a member of the accompaniment of Prince Coloman.

Gyula Pauler distinguished the two persons, and referred to the second governor as simply as Benedict "the Bald". Polish historian Bronisław Włodarski followed the same method, arguing Voivode Benedict, son of Korlát (the first governor) died already in 1209. Tamás Kádár argued, rejecting the identification between the two persons, that the Galician–Volhynian Chronicle styles the second one with the epithet "the Bald" only, which it may use for the purpose of distinction. Font agreed with Włodarski's remarks. Attila Zsoldos rejected the identification between the two governors too.

== Exile ==
Benedict abruptly disappeared from contemporary Hungarian sources in the first half of 1209. He was replaced as voivode by Michael Kacsics still in that year. A royal charter of Andrew II from 1221 narrated that dux Benedict was exiled and confiscated all of his estates. According to the interpretation of historian Mór Wertner, Benedict participated in a conspiracy against Andrew II in 1209–1210, which was intended to the deposition of the king and replace him with one of the sons of the exiled prince Géza from the Byzantine Empire. The conspiracy failed, when the participants' envoys sent to Byzantium were captured in Spalato. Benedict was sentenced to exile and confiscation of property, according to a charter from 1221, he fled abroad.

His wife, Tota remained in Hungary despite his exile and disgrace, and continued to belong to the royal household. She faithfully served Yolanda of Courtenay, the second wife of Andrew II since 1215. In the aforementioned charter (1221), Andrew II returned Benedict's confiscated lands to Tota in recognition of her services. Benedict was still alive when the diploma is issued, but never returned to Hungary. Tota died sometime between 1221 and 1230. Her wealth – Bajót and Nagymarton – was inherited by her brother Simon, who, however, was forced to prove the legitimacy of his ownership right during a lawsuit in 1230.

== Sources ==
=== Primary sources ===
- Simon of Kéza: The Deeds of the Hungarians (Edited and translated by László Veszprémy and Frank Schaer with a study by Jenő Szűcs) (1999). CEU Press. ISBN 963-9116-31-9.
- The Hypatian Codex II: The Galician-Volynian Chronicle (An annotated translation by George A. Perfecky) (1973). Wilhelm Fink Verlag. LCCN 72-79463.

=== Secondary sources ===
- Engel, Pál (2001). The Realm of St Stephen: A History of Medieval Hungary, 895–1526. I.B. Tauris Publishers. ISBN 1-86064-061-3.
- Font, Márta (2021). The Kings of the House of Árpád and the Rurikid Princes. Cooperation and conflict in medieval Hungary and Kievan Rus'. Arpadiana VIII., Research Centre for the Humanities. ISBN 978-963-416-278-0.
- Fügedi, Erik (1986). Ispánok, bárók, kiskirályok [Ispáns, Barons and Petty Kings]. Magvető. ISBN 963-14-0582-6.
- Herucová, Angelika (2015). "Palatine Then Antichrist. Benedict in the Chronicle of Galicia-Volhynia". Colloquia Russica. 1 (5). Jagiellonian University: 117–127. ISSN 2083-9251.
- Kádár, Tamás (2018). "Az uralkodóházzal vérrokoni kapcsolatban nem álló előkelők hercegi titulusa és címhasználata a kora középkori Magyarországon [Ducal Title and Title Use of Nobles not related to the Royal Dynasty in Early Medieval Hungary]". Turul (in Hungarian). 91 (4). Magyar Heraldikai és Genealógiai Társaság: 121–131. ISSN 1216-7258.
- Markó, László (2006). A magyar állam főméltóságai Szent Istvántól napjainkig: Életrajzi Lexikon [Great Officers of State in Hungary from King Saint Stephen to Our Days: A Biographical Encyclopedia] (in Hungarian). Helikon Kiadó. ISBN 963-547-085-1.
- Molnár, Péter (2023). Kézai Simon "hun–magyar alkotmánytana". Egy elképzelés vélt és valós külföldi forrásai, hazai fogalmi háttere és politikai közege [The "Hun–Hungarian Constitutional Theory" of Simon of Kéza. The Alleged and Real Foreign Sources of an Adea, its Domestic Conceptual Background and Political Environment] (in Hungarian). Arpadiana XII., Research Centre for the Humanities. ISBN 978-963-416-373-2.
- Pauler, Gyula (1899). A magyar nemzet története az Árpád-házi királyok alatt, II. [The History of the Hungarian Nation during the Árpádian Kings, Vol. 2.] (in Hungarian). Athenaeum.
- Senga, Toru (2016). ""Benedikt Bor", Benedek és Bankó Halicsban 1210 körül. 1. rész ["Benedikt Bor", Benedict and Banco in Halych around 1210, Vol. 1.]". Magyar Nyelv (in Hungarian). 112 (1). Magyar Nyelvtudományi Társaság: 32–49. ISSN 0025-0228.
- Zsoldos, Attila (2009). "A Nagymartoniak: egy aragóniai család Magyarországon [The Nagymartonis: an Aragonese Family in Hungary]". In Tóth, Csaba; Sarobe, Ramon (eds.). Királylányok messzi földről. Magyarország és Katalónia a középkorban (in Hungarian). Hungarian National Museum. pp. 177–189. ISBN 978-963-706-164-6.
- Zsoldos, Attila (2011). Magyarország világi archontológiája, 1000–1301 [Secular Archontology of Hungary, 1000–1301] (in Hungarian). História, MTA Történettudományi Intézete. ISBN 978-963-9627-38-3.
- Zsoldos, Attila (2022). Az Aranybulla királya [The King of the Golden Bull] (in Hungarian). Városi Levéltár és Kutatóintézet. ISBN 978-963-8406-26-2.

Political offices
Preceded by Nicholas I	Voivode of Transylvania; 1202–1206	Succeeded by Smaragd
Preceded by Smaragd	Voivode of Transylvania; 1208–1209	Succeeded by Michael Kacsics
