= Velek =

- Dux
- Died: after 1225
- Spouse: a Greek woman (?)
- Issue: a daughter (Anne?); Margaret; Torda (?)

Velek (also Welek; fl. 1225) was a 13th-century dux in the Kingdom of Hungary. His name appears only in a single royal charter of King Andrew II of Hungary in 1225. Because of his unusual title in contemporary Hungary, his person is the subject of historiographical debates.

== Sources ==
In 1225, ispán Bors, the son of Dominic Miskolc, requested "his relative" King Andrew II to confirm the former donations to the Cistercian monastery in Klostermarienberg (today part of Mannersdorf an der Rabnitz, Austria), established by Dominic decades earlier. According to the royal charter, Bors married an unidentified daughter of dux Velek. Only the initial ("A") of her name are known. She compiled her last will and testament in 1231, which mentions her sister Margaret, spouse of a certain Ban Stephen.

The anonymous author of the Gesta Hungarorum wrote his work around the same time, most plausibly, in the first decades of the 13th century. In his chronicle, a certain Velek (Velec, Veluc, Velequius) appears as a prominent and valiant warrior, who actively took part in the Hungarian conquest of the Carpathian Basin (late 9th century) in the region Tiszántúl, alongside Ősbő, when they defeated local ruler Menumorut. The author refers to "Velek, from whose progeny Bishop Torda is descended. These were most noble by birth, like the others that came from the Scythian land and who had followed Prince Álmos with a great host of peoples".

== Interpretations ==
Modern historiography attempted to connect the person of dux Velek, lived at the turn of the 12th and 13th centuries, with the Gesta Hungarorum's fictional character with the same name. Linguist Dezső Pais derived the name Velek from Turkic verb bäl or bil ("know"). In contrast, linguist Elemér Moór considered the name of Slavic origin (Velislav -> Velík -> Velek). Katalin Fehértói also argued in favor of Slavic origin (Vlk ["wolf"] –> Velek).

Historian Károly Sólyom considered that Velek plausibly married a wealthy Greek woman, who arrived to Hungary in 1172 as a lady-in-waiting of Anne of Antioch, the first wife of Béla III of Hungary. The historian compiled this theory based on the last will and testament of Velek's daughter, who bequeathed several Byzantine-origin assets which had belonged to her mother prior to that. Sólyom argued her name could have been Anne. Sólyom identified the author of the Gesta Hungarorum with Peter, Bishop of Győr, who, he claimed, was the son of Velek. Based on the Gesta Hungarorum, Sólyom argued that Velek was a prominent landowner in Zaránd County. According to Dezső Pais and Károly Sólyom, the settlement Elek, which was named after him, functioned as the centre of his estates. His lands presumably laid along the Fehér-Körös (or Crișul Alb), where Anonymus depicted the campaigns led by captain Velek during the Hungarian conquest. It is possible that the village Veleg in Fejér County also took its name after its lord Velek. Reversing the logic, linguist Loránd Benkő considered that Anonymus created the name of captain Velek from one place name or another, and apart from that, there is no connection between the captain and the dux. Sólyom even attempted to identify dux Velek with Alexius, a former Ban of Slavonia, but this is clearly a wrong theory for chronological reasons.

In the work of Anonymus, the activities of captains Velek and Ősbő are narrated through seven chapters, they practically become the epic heroes of the story. Literary historian János Horváth, Jr. therefore assumed that the author of the gesta came from this region (Tiszántúl and Northern Transylvania) and was also genealogically connected to these two persons. Horváth identified the author with that bishop Torda, who descended from captain Velek, according to the Gesta Hungarorum. According to the scholar, Torda was the pagan name of Peter, Bishop of Győr. Accordingly, Peter came from the lineage of chieftain Velek, who had participated in the Hungarian conquest of the Carpathian Basin and, as a result of Peter's intention, is a recurring character in the Gesta Hungarorum. It is plausible that this Peter (Torda) was the son of dux Velek. Horváth considered that his title of dux derives from his earlier position as ban or governor of Slavonia.

Linguist Katalin Fehértói identified Velek with a certain Vilc (or Wilc), who name appears in the Regestrum Varadinense in 1221. This Vilc is mentioned as the ius patron of the monastery of Torda in Békés County (located near present-day Szeghalom). Vilc and his relative Peter filed a lawsuit against the serfs of Apáti. Fehértói considered this Vilc is identical with Velek and Anonymus' line regarding "bishop Torda" in fact refers to the monastery itself. Presumably, the aforementioned Peter is identical with the author of the Gesta Hungarorum. Fehértói argued Velek (Vilc) perhaps led a diplomatic mission to the Byzantine court during the reign of Béla III, and his relative Peter (i.e. Anonymus) belonged to his entourage, which explains the author's knowledge of the Greek language. György Györffy expressed his doubts, arguing that it is not easy to believe that an aristocrat of such an exceptional rank would be mentioned in the court record by omitting his ducal title. Instead, he argued that captain Velek's distinguished role in the gesta does not necessarily mean that the unidentified author was his descendant. According to him, it is just that the author held his contemporary, dux Velek, in high esteem, and it is quite possible that captain Velek is depicted in the story in a role that the namesake contemporary actually played in the court of King Béla III (royal legations, marriage proposals etc.).

György Rácz considered that Anonymus may have obtained the information concerning the campaigns of Ősbő and Velek from the latter's descendant dux Velek. Rácz argued the duke had no extended relatives nor large-scale landholdings in Zaránd County by the time of the writing. It is possible that the estate Elek was possessed by bishop Torda during that time. It is plausible that the lineage of Velek became extinct by the mid-13th century. At the beginning of the 13th century, lords who did not have extensive relatives were not given a genus name in contemporary royal charters.

According to Tamás Kádár, Velek, who lived around 1200, was possibly a descendant of the late 9th-century captain of the same name, or at least he knew and proclaimed himself as such, and it is possible that there was even a former clan bearing the name Velek – after his name or in honor of him – but it can certainly be ruled out that the ducal title of Velek would have had any connection with his supposed or real ancestry. Regarding his title of dux, Kádár considered that Velek was of foreign (Bohemian or Moravian) origin, who settled in Hungary, in the accompaniment of the Moravian lord Mercurius. Maybe Velek is identical with that Velislav (Velík), who is mentioned among the testimonies by a royal charter of Ottokar I of Bohemia in 1199. In this case, there is only a name identity with captain Velek, a protagonist of Anonymus' Gesta Hungarorum. Péter Juhász, in contrast, considered that Velek (Velik) was of Serbian origin, and he arrived to Hungary as a member of the entourage of Beloš in the early 1160s. He later became ispán of Zaránd County. His title reflects that he was perhaps the son or other relative of Beloš, and Velek's son-in-law Bors Miskolc was referred to as "relative" of Andrew II in 1225 due to his marriage with Velek's daughter. Namely, Beloš was the maternal uncle of Béla III.

== Sources ==
=== Primary sources ===
- Anonymus, Notary of King Béla: The Deeds of the Hungarians (Edited, Translated and Annotated by Martyn Rady and László Veszprémy) (2010). In: Rady, Martyn; Veszprémy, László; Bak, János M. (2010); Anonymus and Master Roger; CEU Press; ISBN 978-963-9776-95-1.

=== Secondary studies ===
- Fehértói, Katalin (1993). "Kísérlet Velek, Torda püspök és Anonymus új megközelítésére [An Attempt at a New Approach to Velek, Bishop Torda and Anonymus]". Magyar Nyelv (in Hungarian). 89 (3). Magyar Nyelvtudományi Társaság: 319–328. ISSN 0025-0228.
- Horváth, János (1966a). "P. mester és műve (Első közlemény) [Master P. and His Work (First Part)]". Irodalomtörténeti Közlemények (in Hungarian). 70 (1–2): 1–53. ISSN 0021-1486.
- Horváth, János (1966b). "P. mester és műve (Második közlemény) [Master P. and His Work (Second Part)]". Irodalomtörténeti Közlemények (in Hungarian). 70 (3–4): 261–282. ISSN 0021-1486.
- Juhász, Péter (2019). Anonymus: fikció és realitás. Az Álmos-ág honfoglalása [Anonymus: Fiction and Reality. The Landtaking of the Álmos Branch] (in Hungarian). Belvedere Meridionale. ISBN 978-615-5372-96-4.
- Kádár, Tamás (2018). "Az uralkodóházzal vérrokoni kapcsolatban nem álló előkelők hercegi titulusa és címhasználata a kora középkori Magyarországon [Ducal Title and Title Use of Nobles not related to the Royal Dynasty in Early Medieval Hungary]". Turul (in Hungarian). 91 (4). Magyar Heraldikai és Genealógiai Társaság: 121–131. ISSN 1216-7258.
- Molnár, Péter (2023). Kézai Simon "hun–magyar alkotmánytana". Egy elképzelés vélt és valós külföldi forrásai, hazai fogalmi háttere és politikai közege [The "Hun–Hungarian Constitutional Theory" of Simon of Kéza. The Alleged and Real Foreign Sources of an Adea, its Domestic Conceptual Background and Political Environment] (in Hungarian). Arpadiana XII., Research Centre for the Humanities. ISBN 978-963-416-373-2.
- Rácz, György (2014). "Anonymus Velek kapitánya. Településtörténet és krónikakutatás [Anonymus' Captain Velek. Settlement History and Chronicle Research]". In Bárány, Attila; Dreska, Gábor; Szovák, Kornél (eds.). Arcana tabularii. Tanulmányok Solymosi László tiszteletére (in Hungarian). Magyar Tudományos Akadémia; Debreceni Egyetem; Eötvös Loránd Tudományegyetem Bölcsészettudományi Kara; Pázmány Péter Katolikus Egyetem. pp. 743–756. ISBN 978-963-4737-59-9.
- Sólyom, Károly (1966). "Új szempontok az Anonymus-probléma megoldásához [New Considerations for Solving the "Anonymus Problem"]". Irodalomtörténeti Közlemények (in Hungarian). 70 (1–2): 54–84. ISSN 0021-1486.
- Thoroczkay, Gábor (2009). Írások az Árpád-korról: Történeti és historiográfiai tanulmányok [On the Age of the Árpáds: Historical and Historiographic Studies] (in Hungarian). L'Harmattan. ISBN 978-963-236-165-9.
