= Nicholas of Transylvania =

Nicholas of Transylvania may refer to:

Voivodes sometimes so named:

- Nicholas I of Transylvania, (ruled 1201 and possibly into 1202)
- Nicholas II of Transylvania, (ruled 1213, fl. 1206–1213)
- Miklós Sirokay, a.k.a. Nicholas, (ruled 1342–1344, fl. 1338-late 1350s)
- Nicholas Kont, (ruled 1351–1356, fl. 1343–1367)
- Nicholas of Ilok a.k.a. Nicholas Újlaki, (ruled jointly 1441–1458 and 1462–1465, lived 1410–1477)
