= List of voivodes Nicholas of Transylvania =

Voivodes of Transylvania named Nicholas include the following:

- Nicholas I, voivode (1201/1201–1202)
- Nicholas II, voivode (1213)
- Nicholas Pok or Meggyesi, voivode (1277–1278; 1315–1316)
- Nicholas Sirokay, voivode (1342–1344)
- Nicholas Kont, voivode (1351–1356)
- Nicholas Lackfi, Jr., voivode (1367–1368)
- Nicholas Csáki, voivode (1402–1403; 1415–1426)
- Nicholas Marcali, voivode (1402–1403)
- Nicholas Újlaki, voivode (1441–1458; 1462–1465)
- Nicholas Kanizsai, voivode (1461)
- Nicholas Csupor, voivode (1468–1474)
