= Dominic Miskolc =

Hungarian lord

Judge royal
- Reign: 1188–1193
- Predecessor: Mog
- Successor: Esau
- Died: before 1207
- Noble family: gens Miskolc
- Spouse: unknown
- Issue: Bors; Elizabeth

Dominic from the kindred Miskolc (Hungarian: Miskolc nembeli Domokos; died before 1207) was a Hungarian lord, who served as Judge royal between 1188 and 1193.

== Biography ==
Dominic belonged to the Miskolc kindred. He was the first known member of his clan's Borsmonostor branch. According to a royal charter, he was also a relative of Béla III of Hungary and the Árpád dynasty, as well as Peter II, Bishop of Győr (according to some interpretations). He had two children from his unidentified wife; Bors and a daughter Elizabeth, who married ispán Sebes Hont-Pázmány and thus they were the ascendants of the Count Szentgyörgyi family. Bors' wife was an unidentified daughter of dux Velek.

During the reign of Béla III, he served as Judge royal from 1188 to 1193, beside that he was also ispán of Bodrog County between 1192 and 1193. As one of the most influential lords by that time, he possessed extensive lands in Borsod County (his clan's ancient centre) and the borderland counties in Western Hungary. In 1187, Dominic had pledged to participate in a crusade to the Holy Land, but for some reasons, he was unable to fulfill his vow, therefore in exchange for redemption, he founded a Cistercian monastery in Klostermarienberg (today part of Mannersdorf an der Rabnitz, Austria) in 1194 and he also donated eight surrounding villages and 300 marks to the newly established monastery, which belonged to the authority of Heiligenkreuz Abbey since 1198. From 1194 to 1195, he functioned as Ban of Slavonia, albeit according to non-authentic charters he already had held the office since 1193. He died sometime between 1195, his last appearance in contemporary records, and 1207, when Pope Innocent III referred to him as a deceased person. It is possible that Dominic was still alive even after 1195, as Innocent, who reigned from early 1198, was that pope, who released Dominic from fulfilling his vow to pilgrimage to the Holy Land, according to the privilege letter of Andrew II from 1225.

== Family relationship with the Árpáds ==
A royal charter with questionable credence, issued in 1194 in the name of Béla III, holds the memory of his supposed kinship with the ruling royal house Árpád dynasty: within its text Dominic Miskolc appears as the king’s cognatus, which noun is used for the description of a relative by blood especially on the mother's side or marriage. In contemporary Hungarian records, this term is used mostly for the latter case. Historian Imre Szentpétery classified the document as non-authentic, which was compiled sometime after 1224. Another three documents, issued by Andrew II and Duke Béla, also referred to Dominic's son, Bors as the relative of the royal house. If the 1194 charter is a forgery indeed, it is possible, the fabricator thought if Bors related to Andrew II, this also applies to his father.

The 19th-century historian Mór Wertner argued that Dominic Miskolc was related to the Árpád dynasty by marriage and was a brother-in-law of the Hungarian monarch. Bálint Kis argued that the baron and Béla III were distant cousins as they had common ancestors, presumably 11th-century rulers Béla I or Géza I. Szabolcs Vajay argued ispán Bors, who was elected anti-king against Stephen II in 1128 or 1129 was a relative of the monarch by maternal side and was also a direct ancestor of Dominic and his kindred. Historian Tamás Kádár argued the using of bit nonsensical word "cognatus" in the aforementioned documents excludes the close blood (cousins) and marriage (brothers-in-law) family relationship between Béla III and Dominic Miskolc. Kádár considered that Dominic would have married princess Alice of Antioch, the sister of Queen Agnes and, therefore, the sister-in-law of Béla III. According to the Chronica regia Coloniensis, in Kádár's interpretation, Alice lived in Hungary at least since the 1180s, before marrying to Azzo VI of Este in 1204.

== Sources ==
- Kádár, Tamás (2019). "Egy régi keletű genealógiai talány a 12. század végéről: Miskolc nembeli Domonkos bán rokonsága a magyar királyi családdal [An Enigma of Old Standing from the End of the 12th Century: Relationship with the Hungarian Royal Family of Ban Dominic of the Miskolc kindred]". Turul (in Hungarian). 92 (2). Magyar Heraldikai és Genealógiai Társaság: 49–58. ISSN 1216-7258.
- Markó, László (2006). A magyar állam főméltóságai Szent Istvántól napjainkig: Életrajzi Lexikon [Great Officers of State in Hungary from King Saint Stephen to Our Days: A Biographical Encyclopedia] (in Hungarian). Helikon Kiadó. ISBN 963-208-970-7.
- Zsoldos, Attila (2011). Magyarország világi archontológiája, 1000–1301 [Secular Archontology of Hungary, 1000–1301] (in Hungarian). História, MTA Történettudományi Intézete. ISBN 978-963-9627-38-3.

Dominic Genus Miskolc Born: ? Died: before 1207
Political offices
Preceded by Mog	Judge royal 1188–1193	Succeeded by Esau
Preceded by Kalán Bár-Kalán	Ban of Slavonia; 1193–1195	Succeeded by Andrew
