= Theodore Csanád =

Palatine of Hungary
- Reign: 1222
- Predecessor: Nicholas Szák
- Successor: Julius I Kán
- Born: Unknown
- Died: c. 1234
- Noble family: gens Csanád
- Father: Vejte

Theodore of the Csanád clan (Hungarian: Csanád nembéli Tódor; died c. 1234) was an influential nobleman in the Kingdom of Hungary at the turn of the 12th and 13th centuries. He led a palace coup against Andrew II of Hungary and was installed as Palatine of Hungary for a brief time in 1222. He was also ispán of at least five counties in the first decades of the 13th century.

== Early life ==
Theodore was born into the ancient Hungarian gens (clan) Csanád. He was the son of Vejte Csanád, who served as Judge royal between 1199 and 1200. His two brothers were Vejte (II), who married a daughter of Pousa Bár-Kalán, and Ladislaus, who served as ispán of Csanád County in 1234.

The members of his wide kinship – including Pat Győr, Pousa Bár-Kalán and his father Vejte Csanád – were considered loyal partisans of King Emeric, whose whole reign was characterized by power struggles with his younger brother Duke Andrew. In the same time, when his father Vejte functioned as Judge royal, the young Theodore held the dignity of ispán of Bodrog County from 1199 to 1200.

== 1222 coup d'état ==
Following the death of Emeric in 1204 and Andrew's subsequent ascension to the Hungarian throne in 1205, Theodore lost all political influence and he has not held office for the next two decades. During that time, he gradually became a leading member of that formerly pro-Emeric opposition baronial group, who opposed the king's economic reforms, the so-called "new institutions". Theodore and his companions, were left out of the land donations, which gave rise to serious contradictions with those emerging barons, who were the chief beneficiaries of the king's policy. Andrew II faced conspiracy against his rule in several cases, for instance after his return from the Holy Land in 1218. In order to quell dissatisfaction, the king made several concessions. As a sign of this, Theodore was appointed ispán of Borsod County in 1219.

The available data suggest that discontented barons led by Theodore Csanád, many of whom had held high offices during Emeric's reign, staged a coup d'état (or palace coup) against Andrew II in the spring of 1222. Taking control over the royal council and depriving the confidants of Andrew out of the government, Theodore was installed as Palatine of Hungary. Beside Theodore, for instance, his brother's father-in-law Pousa Bár-Kalán became Judge royal and Tiburtius Rosd, another former partisan of Emeric, functioned as ispán of Pozsony County. The royal council under Theodore returned to the previous calculation of the years of Andrew's reign in the royal charters (1205, instead of 1204, as the beginning of reign), acknowledging the legitimacy of Ladislaus III. According to the interpretation of historians János Karácsonyi and László Erdélyi, their movement was supported by the church and the masses of royal servants, who were landowners directly subject to the monarch's power and obliged to fight in the royal army, since they also became victims of Andrew's immoderate donation of royal landholdings. Karácsonyi argued Theodore Csanád and his circle forced the monarch around April during a diet to issue the Golden Bull of 1222, which summarized the liberties of the royal servants and authorized the prelates and barons of the realm to resist the monarch if he did not honor the provisions of the charter (the so-called "clause of resistance"). Karácsonyi argued Theodore and his partisans were temporarily deprived from power at the end of July 1222, and the king appointed Nicholas Szák as Palatine of Hungary again. This caused another rebellion by early November 1222, as a result, Andrew replaced the members of the royal council with consensual barons, for instance Julius Kán. The Hungarian monarch promised to convene two parliaments annually.

In contrast, historian Attila Zsoldos considered Theodore and his accompaniment were identical with those "some wicked men", who had forced Andrew II to share his realms with his heir and political opponent Duke Béla, according to a letter of July 1222 of Pope Honorius III. Theodore and the other pro-Emeric lords launched a coup d'état in April 1222. According to Zsoldos' interpretation, Andrew II issued the Golden Bull, which recorded the main aspects of his reform policy called "new institutions" in order to offset their political expansion. Despite that, Theodore and his allies took control over the royal council, occupying the most important positions, and nominally swore loyalty to the heir apparent Béla. The royal council under the leadership of Theodore began to supervise Andrew's former royal grants of landholdings, which caused tensions among the aristocratic elite. Andrew II regained whole control over his kingdom in the second half of 1222, after he summoned a national diet against his political opponents. Theodore was dismissed from his position; he was succeeded by Julius Kán, a faithful confidant of the king.

== Later life ==
Theodore Csanád became a member of the entourage of Duke Béla after his failed coup d'état attempt. He served as ispán of Bihar County in 1224. Subsequently, he was styled as ispán of Moson County in 1225. He functioned as ispán of Újvár County in 1233. Theodore Csanád died sometime around 1234.

== Sources ==
- Markó, László (2006). A magyar állam főméltóságai Szent Istvántól napjainkig: Életrajzi Lexikon [Great Officers of State in Hungary from King Saint Stephen to Our Days: A Biographical Encyclopedia] (in Hungarian). Helikon Kiadó. ISBN 963-547-085-1.
- Zsoldos, Attila (2011a). Magyarország világi archontológiája, 1000–1301 [Secular Archontology of Hungary, 1000–1301] (in Hungarian). História, MTA Történettudományi Intézete. ISBN 978-963-9627-38-3.
- Zsoldos, Attila (2011b). "II. András Aranybullája [Andrew II's Golden Bull]". Történelmi Szemle (in Hungarian). LIII (1): 1–38. ISSN 0040-9634.

Theodore Genus Csanád Born: ? Died: c. 1234
Political offices
| Preceded by Nicholas Szák | Palatine of Hungary; 1222 | Succeeded by Julius Kán |
