= Andrew, Ban of Slavonia =

Hungarian lord

Andrew

Ban of Slavonia
- Reign: 1198
- Predecessor: Dominic Miskolc
- Successor: Nicholas
- Died: before 1208
- Spouses: 1, unidentified 2, Margaret, daughter of King Géza II
- Issue: (1) Andronikos

Andrew (Hungarian: András; died before 1208) was a Hungarian lord at the end of the 12th century, who – as a confidant of the rebellious Duke Andrew – served as Ban of Slavonia. Through his marriage, he was son-in-law of the late King Géza II of Hungary.

== Career ==
According to genealogist Mór Wertner, Andrew belonged to the gens (clan) Kadarkalász, which possessed landholdings in Veszprém and Pilis counties. Wertner established the theory based on the name of his son Andronikos, since an eponymous member of the clan (Andronikos, son of Andrew) is mentioned in 1248. However, János Karácsonyi refused the identification due to chronological considerations. Andrew had a son Andronikos, who already appeared as a comes and testa in 1198, i.e. he was adult by then. For this reason, it is likely that Andronikos was born from his father's first marriage to an unidentified lady.

Andrew started his career during the reign of King Béla III of Hungary. He served as ispán of Sopron County at least from 1192 to 1193. According to non-authentic royal charters, he held the position even in 1194 or 1195. A royal charter from 1213 styles him as "former" ispán of Vas County, who was previously involved in a dispute between the border guards of Zala County and the Szentgotthárd Abbey over the land Dobra (present-day Neuhaus am Klausenbach in Austria). Historian Ede Reiszig determined Andrew's term as ispán within the period sometime between 1193 and 1203.

After Emeric ascended the Hungarian throne in 1196, he was embroiled in dynastic conflict with his younger brother Duke Andrew, who forced the monarch to make him de facto ruler of Croatia and Dalmatia as appanage in 1197. Andrew was considered an influential confidant of the duke during the brothers' feud, which characterized almost the whole reign of Emeric. Andrew was made Ban of Slavonia by Duke Andrew in early 1198. His name first appears in this dignity in the duke's privilege letter to the coastal city Zadar in March 1198. During that time, he was the most illustrious member of the ducal court (possibly it was also due to his second marriage, see below). His name is frequently listed first among the witnesses to Duke Andrew's grants of privileges, even preceding the Dalmatian prelates, which was atypical in the period. It is plausible that Ban Andrew took part in his lord's campaign to Zachlumia (Hum) and Raška (Serbia) in the spring of 1198.

According to György Szabados, his position was not recognized by King Emeric, who appointed a parallel ban, Nicholas over the province. Some Croatian historians, for instance Tadija Smičiklas, confused the two Andrews – the duke and his ban. It is plausible that Andrew lost his office, when Emeric defeated his brother's army, forcing Duke Andrew to flee to Austria in the summer of 1199. Prior to 1208, Andrew administered Somogy County, but its exact date is unknown.

== Marriage ==
A letter of Pope Innocent III, which was sent to Kalanda, Bishop of Veszprém and the abbot of Bakonybél on 13 April 1208, narrates that Andrew married Margaret, an aunt (amita) of Andrew II. Both Andrew and Margaret died prior to that. The princess bequeathed her dower to the Knights Templar in her last will and testament, but Andrew's son Andronikos (or Andronicus) – who was still alive in 1208 – refused to hand over the amount or landholding. The pope instructed the local prelates to persuade the lord to fulfill Margaret's wish. The letter was re-discovered by Jesuit historian István Katona then György Pray.

Based on the letter, Mór Wertner considered Margaret was the youngest, possibly posthumous daughter of King Géza II and Euphrosyne of Kiev. Géza died in 1162, so she must have been born before or soon after. It is plausible that she is identical with the daughter who accompanied her mother, Euphrosyne, to the Byzantine Empire in 1186 (or 1174–1175?). This daughter married Isaac Doukas, the son of Constantine Makrodoukas, as the Annales Posonienses narrates. Accordingly, following the death of this husband, Margaret returned to Hungary where she married Andrew, who thus became a brother-in-law of Béla III. Whether this marriage produced Andronikos, is unknown – his Greek-sounding name implies that, but he was already referred to as adult in 1198 and his behavior regarding the princess' last will suggests that he was born from Andrew's possible first marriage. Pope Innocent's letter only refer to Andronikos as Andrew's son.

A 15-century royal charter narrates that Andrew II married off his "blood relative" ("consanguinea") Margaret to his confidant Mercurius (who died in 1206 or shortly after). The chronicler Simon of Kéza mentioned Mercurius and Margaret had descendants, the Janur (Gyánúr) kinship. It is possible this Margaret is identical with the daughter of Géza II. According to this reconstruction, Margaret married three times, to Isaac Doukas, Andrew, then Mercurius. This indicates that Andrew died long before 1208, possibly shortly after 1198 or 1199 (when Duke Andrew was allowed to return to Croatia in 1200, the name of his confidant Andrew is no longer mentioned).

== Sources ==
- Gál, Judit (2020). Dalmatia and the Exercise of Royal Authority in the Árpád-Era Kingdom of Hungary. Arpadiana III., Research Centre for the Humanities. ISBN 978-963-416-227-8.
- Karácsonyi, János (1901). A magyar nemzetségek a XIV. század közepéig. II. kötet [The Hungarian genera until the middle of the 14th century, Vol. 2] (in Hungarian). Hungarian Academy of Sciences.
- Neumann, Tibor (2009). "Egy morva "herceg" és egy Árpád-házi hercegnő leszármazottai (A Gyánúr-fiak eredete és rövid története) [Offspring of a Moravian "Duke" and a Hungarian Princess (The Origin and Short Story of the Janur Kindred)]". Acta Universitatis Szegediensis. Acta Historica (in Hungarian). 130. MTA-SZTE-MOL Magyar Medievisztikai Kutatócsoport: 15–32. ISSN 0324-6965.
- Szabados, György (1999). "Imre és András [Emeric and Andrew]". Századok (in Hungarian). 133 (1). Magyar Történelmi Társulat: 85–111. ISSN 0039-8098.
- Wertner, Mór (1892). Az Árpádok családi története [Family History of the Árpáds] (in Hungarian). Szabó Ferencz N.-eleméri plébános & Pleitz Fer. Pál Könyvnyomdája.
- Zsoldos, Attila (2011). Magyarország világi archontológiája, 1000–1301 [Secular Archontology of Hungary, 1000–1301] (in Hungarian). História, MTA Történettudományi Intézete. ISBN 978-963-9627-38-3.
- Zsoldos, Attila (2022). Az Aranybulla királya [The King of the Golden Bull] (in Hungarian). Városi Levéltár és Kutatóintézet. ISBN 978-963-8406-26-2.

Political offices
Preceded by Dominic Miskolc	Ban of Slavonia; 1198	Succeeded by Nicholas
