= Mog, Palatine of Hungary =

Hungarian lord

Mog

Palatine of Hungary
- Reign: 1192–1193; 1198–1199; 1206
- Predecessor: Thomas (1st term); Esau (2nd term); Nicholas (3rd term)
- Successor: Esau (1st term); Mika Ják (2nd term); Csépán Győr (3rd term)
- Died: after 1210
- Spouses: 1, unidentified 2, unidentified (c. 1206)

Mog, also Moch, Magh or Mok (died after 1210) was a powerful Hungarian lord at the turn of the 12th and 13th centuries, who served as Palatine of Hungary three times.

== Family ==
His origin and ancestry is uncertain; historians Mór Wertner and Pál Engel assigned him to the Hont-Pázmány clan as the son of Jakó Hont-Pázmány from the Födémes branch, while Attila Zsoldos argued it is also considerable that Palatine Mog was identical with Mog from the gens Csanád whose son Michael is mentioned by a charter in 1237. He may have been a Pecheneg whose name has been thought to come from Arabic Madjûs. Mog had a child from his unidentified first wife.

Sometime prior to the summer of 1206, Mog requested Pope Innocent III to annul his second marriage with an unidentified noblewoman, claiming that he was unaware before his marriage that his wife was related to him. The pope instructed John, Archbishop of Esztergom and Katapán, Bishop of Eger to investigate the case and then carry out the invalidation in June 1206.

== Career ==
Mog was a loyal supporter of Béla III of Hungary. He served as Judge royal (Latin: curialis comes) between 1185 and 1186. He was appointed ispán of Nyitra County in 1188. He became Palatine at first even the reign of Béla III, assuredly from 1192 to 1193, however according to non-authentic royal charters he already held the office from 1188 and was also mentioned as Palatine in a false diploma issued in 1194. Beside that high-rank position, Mog also functioned as ispán of Bács County between 1192 and 1193. Thus he was the first known incumbent Palatine who also received an ispánate in addition to the dignity. Alongside his king and Job, Archbishop of Esztergom, Mog had pledged to participate in a crusade to the Holy Land sometime around in 1195, but he had been allowed to defer the fulfillment his vow due to the death of Béla III in the next year and the subsequent civil war in Hungary in order to strengthen the rule of Emeric, King of Hungary.

His first term as Palatine reflected developments on the functions of the position; the Latin phrase of "comes" worn down permanently from the title of the office, the term "palatinus" gradually changed to noun in the following decades. According to a charter issued by the Diocese of Veszprém in 1192, Palatine Mog functioned as a judge at two land proceedings of Hahold II from the gens Hahót, who accused a certain Paris that he expropriated a portion of Hahold's estate. The second trial was between Hahold and udvornici from Zala County. In both cases Mog ruled in favor of Hahold. This is the first source when a Palatine judged not only due special orders of the King. Thus it is highly probable that an independent palatinal judicial bench was established on a permanent basis during the first term of Mog. The judicial role of special presence was transformed to the position of Judge royal, as a result the Judge royal's economic functions was taken over by the Master of the treasury which dignity was stabilized during that time.

Mog was nominated for the second time as head of the palatinal institution in 1198, replacing Esau. He became ispán of Bács County (which presumably was the first ex officio ispánate of the Palatine dignity) again. However, in the next year Mog was deprived from his office, for it was revealed that he had conspired against the king. Duke Andrew hatched his umpteenth conspiracy against his elder brother Emeric, King of Hungary with the help of many other prelates and lords, including Palatine Mog. According to the letter of Emeric to Pope Innocent III, Mog's betrayal encouraged Andrew to rebel against his rule and make an attempt to gain the throne. However the coup attempt was uncovered on 10 March 1199 and royal troops routed Andrew's army while the duke fled to Austria. Andrew was allowed to return to Croatia and Dalmatia in the next year. Becoming a member of Andrew's retinue, comes Mog frequently appeared in the dignity lists of the charters issued by Andrew in the period between 1200 and 1202, alongside other defected lord, Nicholas.

Mog lost all of his political influence at the royal court during the remaining rest of Emeric's reign, and in this desperate situation, he decided to fulfill his vow finally thus he joined to the Fourth Crusade. He was among the "neglected majority" of non-Venetians (as historian Donald E. Queller worded), who did not participate in the Sack of Constantinople, and marched towards to Acre. According to a letter of Cardinal Soffredo to Pope Innocent, when he sailed to Antioch in the spring of 1203 in order to end the succession dispute between Bohemond IV of Antioch and Leo II of Armenia, he was escorted by Mog and Stephen du Perche, among others. In the letter, he is referred to as "comes Moncia de Hungaria". It is possible he traveled to the Holy Land in the accompaniment of the French knights of Simon de Montfort, who stayed in the Republic of Venice then marched to Acre via Apulia.

He returned to Hungary when Andrew II ascended the throne in 1205, following the sudden death of his nephew Ladislaus III, Emeric's son. He served as ispán of Bodrog County in 1205. Mog participated in Andrew's campaign to recapture Galicia and protect the realm of the child-prince Daniel Romanovich in the late autumn of 1205. When Andrew, now also "King of Galicia and Lodomeria" returned to home, he left behind a Hungarian garrison in Sanok under the leadership of Mog in early 1206. The Galician–Volhynian Chronicle refers to Mog ("Mokij") as tall and one-eyed. His garrison was strengthened by officers and boyars Korochun, Volpt, the latter's son Vitomir and Blaginia. In early 1206, Rurik Rostislavich launched another attack. Mog's troops avoided the confrontation and returned to Hungary. In 1206, Mog was appointed Palatine for the third time and ispán of Sopron County. Beside these offices he also served as ispán of Bihar County from 1206 to 1207. He was soon ousted from the king's innermost circle and has not received high dignity anymore. According to a charter, he was ispán of Bars County in 1208. Between 1208 and 1210, he functioned as ispán of Pozsony County. He died sometime after.

== Sources ==
- Barabás, Gábor (2015). A pápaság és Magyarország a 13. század első felében. Pápai hatás – együttműködés – érdekellentét [The Papacy and Hungary in the First Half of the 13th Century. Papal influence – cooperation – clash of interests] (in Hungarian). Pécsi Történettudományért Kulturális Egyesület. ISBN 978-963-89482-5-0.
- Font, Márta (2021). The Kings of the House of Árpád and the Rurikid Princes. Cooperation and conflict in medieval Hungary and Kievan Rus'. Arpadiana VIII., Research Centre for the Humanities. ISBN 978-963-416-278-0.
- Markó, László (2006). A magyar állam főméltóságai Szent Istvántól napjainkig: Életrajzi Lexikon [Great Officers of State in Hungary from King Saint Stephen to Our Days: A Biographical Encyclopedia] (in Hungarian). Helikon Kiadó. ISBN 963-208-970-7.
- Sweeney, James Ross (1984). "Magyarország és a keresztes hadjáratok a 12–13. században [Hungary and the Crusades in the 12–13th Centuries]". Századok (in Hungarian). 118 (1). Magyar Történelmi Társulat: 114–124. ISSN 0039-8098.
- Szabados, György (1999). "Imre és András [Emeric and Andrew]". Századok (in Hungarian). 133 (1). Magyar Történelmi Társulat: 85–111. ISSN 0039-8098.
- Szőcs, Tibor (2014). A nádori intézmény korai története, 1000–1342 [An Early History of the Palatinal Institution: 1000–1342] (in Hungarian). Magyar Tudományos Akadémia Támogatott Kutatások Irodája. ISBN 978-963-508-697-9.
- Zsoldos, Attila (2011). Magyarország világi archontológiája, 1000–1301 [Secular Archontology of Hungary, 1000–1301] (in Hungarian). História, MTA Történettudományi Intézete. ISBN 978-963-9627-38-3.
- Zsoldos, Attila (2022). Az Aranybulla királya [The King of the Golden Bull] (in Hungarian). Városi Levéltár és Kutatóintézet. ISBN 978-963-8406-26-2.

Political offices
Preceded by Charena	Judge royal 1185–1186	Succeeded by Dominic Miskolc
Preceded by Thomas	Palatine of Hungary; 1192–1193	Succeeded by Esau
Preceded by Esau	Palatine of Hungary; 1198–1199	Succeeded by Mika Ják
Preceded by Nicholas	Palatine of Hungary; 1206	Succeeded by Csépán Győr
