= Achilles (judge royal) =

Hungarian noble

Judge royal
- Reign: 1201
- Predecessor: Vejte Csanád
- Successor: Julius Kán
- Died: after 1201

Achilles or Achilleus (died after 1201) was a Hungarian noble, who served as Judge Royal in 1201, during the reign of Emeric, King of Hungary. Beside that he was also ispán of Keve County.

Presumably he was identical with a certain ispán Achilles, who was mentioned in a royal charter issued in 1184, where an investigation took place on the subject of serfs' affiliation in Úrkút.

== Sources ==
- (in Hungarian) Markó, László (2006). A magyar állam főméltóságai Szent Istvántól napjainkig – Életrajzi Lexikon ("The High Officers of the Hungarian State from Saint Stephen to the Present Days – A Biographical Encyclopedia") (2nd edition); Helikon Kiadó Kft., Budapest; ISBN 963-547-085-1
- (in Hungarian) Zsoldos, Attila (2011). Magyarország világi archontológiája, 1000–1301 ("Secular Archontology of Hungary, 1000–1301"). História, MTA Történettudományi Intézete. Budapest. ISBN 978-963-9627-38-3

Political offices
Preceded by Vejte Csanád	Judge royal 1201	Succeeded by Julius Kán
