= Nicholas, Palatine of Hungary =

Hungarian lord (died after 1215)

Nicholas

Palatine of Hungary
- Reign: 1205; 1213–1214
- Predecessor: Benedict (1st term); Bánk Bár-Kalán (2nd term)
- Successor: Mog (1st term); Julius Kán (2nd term)
- Died: after 1215
- Spouse: unknown
- Issue: Nicholas II

Nicholas (Hungarian: Miklós; died after 1215) was an influential Hungarian lord, who served as Palatine of Hungary twice during the reign of Andrew II of Hungary.

== Identification ==
His origin is uncertain: according to a royal charter issued in 1233, he had a namesake son, who held the office of Master of the treasury from 1231 to 1235. Thus it is excluded with absolute certainty that Palatine Nicholas was identical with Nicholas Szák, Nicholas Csák or Nicholas, brother of Mojs I, all of whom were barons of Andrew II during that time.

== Career ==
In contemporary records, Nicholas was first mentioned as Ban of Slavonia in 1200, when Andrew, the brother of King Emeric held the royal title of Duke of Slavonia, therefore can be assumed that Nicholas was a loyal supporter of Andrew, who rebelled against the rule of his brother several times. According to László Markó and former archontological works, Nicholas also served as ispán of Zala County between 1199 and 1200, however historian Attila Zsoldos distinguishes Palatine Nicholas from Nicholas I of Transylvania, who was also Ban of Slavonia in 1199, and was ispán of several counties as Emeric's loyal man, according to Zsoldos. Palatine Nicholas was mentioned as ispán in the court of Duke Andrew from 1200 to 1202.

Nicholas was the first Palatine for Andrew II, who had ascended the Hungarian throne in 1205. Beside that he also served as ispán of Újvár County in 1205, then head of Nyitra County between 1205 and 1207, and finally head of Szolnok County in 1207. From 1208 to 1210, he functioned as Judge royal, while also held the ispán offices in Pozsony (1208 and 1211–1212), Keve Counties (1208–1209 and 1209–1210). From 1212 to 1213, he was ispán of Sopron County.

He was appointed Palatine for the second time in 1213, replacing Bánk Bár-Kalán, who had participated in the murder of Queen Gertrude. Former archontological works written by historians Mór Wertner and Gyula Pauler, stated that the 1213–1214 period was the first palatinal term of Nicholas Szák. He was also ispán of Csanád County in 1213 and ispán of Bodrog County between 1214 and 1215.

== Sources ==
- (in Hungarian) Markó, László (2006). A magyar állam főméltóságai Szent Istvántól napjainkig – Életrajzi Lexikon ("The High Officers of the Hungarian State from Saint Stephen to the Present Days – A Biographical Encyclopedia") (2nd edition); Helikon Kiadó Kft., Budapest; ISBN 963-547-085-1
- (in Hungarian) Szőcs, Tibor (2014). A nádori intézmény korai története, 1000–1342 ("An Early History of the Palatinal Institution: 1000–1342"). Subsidia ad historiam medii aevi Hungariae inquirendam Vol. 5., Budapest; ISBN 978-963-508-697-9
- (in Hungarian) Zsoldos, Attila (2011). Magyarország világi archontológiája, 1000–1301 ("Secular Archontology of Hungary, 1000–1301"). História, MTA Történettudományi Intézete. Budapest. ISBN 978-963-9627-38-3

Political offices
Preceded by Benedict	Ban of Slavonia; 1200	Succeeded by Martin Hont-Pázmány
Preceded by Benedict	Palatine of Hungary; 1205	Succeeded by Mog
Preceded by Marcellus Tétény	Judge royal 1208–1210	Succeeded by Marcellus Tétény
Preceded by Bánk Bár-Kalán	Palatine of Hungary; 1213–1214	Succeeded by Julius Kán
