= Benedict, Palatine of Hungary =

Hungarian lord

Benedict

Palatine of Hungary
- Reign: 1202–1204
- Predecessor: Mika Ják
- Successor: Nicholas
- Died: after 1204
- Issue: Benedict

Benedict (Hungarian: Benedek; died after 1204) was a Hungarian lord at the turn of the 12th and 13th centuries, who served as Ban of Slavonia from 1199 to 1200 and as Palatine of Hungary from 1202 to 1204. He was a staunch supporter of Emeric, King of Hungary.

== Identification ==
It is possible that Benedict originated from the gens (clan) Osl. He had a namesake son, who functioned as vice-judge royal in 1221.

Due to the lack of sources and the presence of multiple barons named Benedict in the period simultaneously, there are a number of difficulties in drawing and defining his career path. Based on chronology and political situation, Benedict was a faithful partisan of King Emeric, who had to face series of rebellions from his younger brother, Duke Andrew, throughout his whole reign. According to historian Attila Zsoldos, he is definitely not identical with Benedict, son of Korlát or that another namesake noble, who held ispánates after 1205, when Andrew II ascended the Hungarian throne.

== Career ==
Benedict started his career as ispán of Nyitra County in 1198. After Emeric routed Andrew's army near Lake Balaton in the summer of 1199, forcing the duke to fled Austria, the king, replacing Nicholas, installed Benedict as Ban of Slavonia, taking over the administration of the provinces Croatia and Slavonia, which then belonged to Andrew's duchy. Simultaneously with the dignity of ban, Benedict served as ispán of Zala County too, which then attached to the Duchy of Slavonia. As ban, Benedict donated his estate Vaška in Virovitica County to the Knights Templar. Benedict held both positions until 1200, when Emeric reconciled with his younger brother, and Andrew was allowed to return to his duchy.

Thereafter, Benedict administered Bács County in 1201. According to a non-authentic charter, he held the office still in 1202. Benedict was made Palatine of Hungary in 1202, holding the dignity until 1204, Emeric's death. Beside that, he was also referred to as ispán of Bihar County between 1202 and 1203. Benedict is the first office-holder, who was styled as simply "palatinus" without the prefix or suffix "comes" ("count"). He was also one of the last palatines without any known preserved charters issued by him.

Following the death of Emeric in 1204, Benedict plausibly belonged to the partisans of the child king Ladislaus III and his mother Queen Constance of Aragon, opposing Andrew's regency. Therefore, when Andrew II ascended the throne in 1205, Benedict lost all political influence and never gained any offices. According to Slovak historian Angelika Herucová, Andrew II had problems getting rid of previously powerful noblemen, so it cannot be ruled out that Benedict continued his career as ispán of several counties – Bodrog (1205), Sopron (1206–1208), Újvár (1209), then Ung (1214) counties – nor he is identical with that infamous Benedict "the Antichrist", who governed Halych with brutal means on behalf of the Hungarian king from 1210 to 1211.

== Sources ==
- Herucová, Angelika (2015). "Palatine Then Antichrist. Benedict in the Chronicle of Galicia-Volhynia". Colloquia Russica. 1 (5). Jagiellonian University: 117–127. ISSN 2083-9251.
- Markó, László (2006). A magyar állam főméltóságai Szent Istvántól napjainkig: Életrajzi Lexikon [Great Officers of State in Hungary from King Saint Stephen to Our Days: A Biographical Encyclopedia] (in Hungarian). Helikon Kiadó. ISBN 963-547-085-1.
- Szabados, György (1999). "Imre és András [Emeric and Andrew]". Századok (in Hungarian). 133 (1). Magyar Történelmi Társulat: 85–111. ISSN 0039-8098.
- Szőcs, Tibor (2014). A nádori intézmény korai története, 1000–1342 [An Early History of the Palatinal Institution: 1000–1342] (in Hungarian). Magyar Tudományos Akadémia Támogatott Kutatások Irodája. ISBN 978-963-508-697-9.
- Zsoldos, Attila (2011). Magyarország világi archontológiája, 1000–1301 [Secular Archontology of Hungary, 1000–1301] (in Hungarian). História, MTA Történettudományi Intézete. ISBN 978-963-9627-38-3.
- Zsoldos, Attila (2022). Az Aranybulla királya [The King of the Golden Bull] (in Hungarian). Városi Levéltár és Kutatóintézet. ISBN 978-963-8406-26-2.

Political offices
Preceded by Nicholas	Ban of Slavonia; 1199–1200	Succeeded by Nicholas
Preceded by Mika Ják	Palatine of Hungary; 1202–1204	Succeeded by Nicholas
