= Esau (judge royal) =

Judge royal
- Reign: 1197–1198
- Predecessor: Dominic Miskolc
- Successor: Peter, son of Töre

Esau (Hungarian: Ézsau) was a lord in the Kingdom of Hungary, who served as Judge royal between 1197 and 1198, during the reign of Emeric, King of Hungary.

According to historian Attila Zsoldos he is not identical with his contemporary namesake, who functioned as Palatine of Hungary at the same time, from 1197 to 1198. Judge royal Esau also held the office of ispán of Csanád County between 1197 and 1198. Furthermore, non-authentic charters also propose that Esau was already Judge royal since 1193–1195, which data does not conflict with reliable sources.

== Sources ==
- (in Hungarian) Zsoldos, Attila (2011). Magyarország világi archontológiája, 1000–1301 ("Secular Archontology of Hungary, 1000–1301"). História, MTA Történettudományi Intézete. Budapest. ISBN 978-963-9627-38-3

Political offices
Preceded by Dominic Miskolc	Judge royal 1197–1198	Succeeded by Peter, son of Töre
