= Julius I Kán =

Hungarian baron and landowner

Julius (I) Kán

Palatine of Hungary
- Reign: 1215–1217 (or 1218); 1222–1226
- Predecessor: Nicholas (1st term); Theodore Csanád (2nd term)
- Successor: Nicholas Szák (1st term); Nicholas Szák (2nd term)
- Born: Unknown
- Died: 1237
- Noble family: gens Kán
- Spouse: Helena N
- Issue: Ladislaus I Julius II

Julius (I) from the kindred Kán (Hungarian: Kán nembeli (I.) Gyula; died 1237) was a powerful Hungarian baron and landowner, who held several secular positions during the reign of kings Emeric, Ladislaus III and Andrew II. He was the ancestor of the gens Kán which originated from Baranya County.

== Family ==
Julius I (often called as "the Elder" or "the Great" by contemporary documents in order to distinguish him from his namesake son) was the first known member of the gens (clan) Kán, which originated from Baranya County, but later acquired large-scale domains in Transylvania too. The later members of the clan were usually styled themselves as "Progenies Magni Jule Bani" ("descendants of Ban Julius the Great"). He married the unknown surname Helena (died before 1250). They had two sons, by name Ladislaus I, who served as palatine (1242–1244/5), and Julius II, master of the cupbearers (1222–1228). His great-grandson was Ladislaus III Kán, an infamous oligarch, who ruled the province Transylvania de facto independently of the royal power for decades.

== Career ==
His name was first mentioned by records as voivode of Transylvania in 1201. Besides voivodeship he also functioned as ispán (comes) of Fehér County. He held the office of judge royal between 1202 and 1204, besides that he was the ispán of Csanád (1202–1203) and Nyitra Counties (1204).

After the death of Ladislaus III, he became an ardent admirer of Andrew II. He served as ispán of Sopron County in 1205. After that he was appointed ispán of Bodrog County in 1206, a position which he held until 1212. Between 1212 and 1213, he again became judge royal, besides that he received the manor of Bács County as ispán. In 1213, he was appointed ban of Slavonia and ispán of Vas County. One year later, he became voivode of Transylvania for the second term, besides that he functioned as ispán of Szolnok County.

Julius I Kán was appointed palatine of Hungary, the second-highest secular office after the king in 1215 and held the position until 1217. According to a non-authentic charter he also functioned as palatine in 1218. He also served as ispán of Sopron County in 1215. Julius was the first office-holder who used the shortened "palatinus" form instead of "comes palatinus". The first surviving palatinal charter in its entirety was also issued by Julius in 1216, when instructed the cathedral chapter of Várad, a place of authentication (today Oradea, Romania) to record in writing one of his previous judgments in a litigation case. During Andrew II's Fifth Crusade (1217–1218), Julius and royal governor John, Archbishop of Esztergom could not prevent the emergence of anarchic conditions, as a result he lost his political influence for a short time.

He regained his former influence, as he was appointed ban of Slavonia and ispán of Somogy County in 1219. As ban, Julius played an important role in the election of the Hungarian cleric Göncöl (Guncel) as Archbishop of Split, by writing a letter to the burghers of the town urging them to vote for his "relative", Göncöl as their archbishop. He served as ispán of Szolnok and Bodrog Counties from 1220 to 1221. In 1221, he became a member of the queen's court, as the master of the treasury and judge royal for Queen Yolanda de Courtenay. One year later he was appointed palatine for the second time (1222–1226) and ispán of Bodrog County (1222–1224). He served as ispán of Sopron County between 1224 and 1226. This latter position was also held by Julius from 1228 to 1230. As palatine, the Pechenegs of Árpás were under his authority according to his charter in 1224, when he defined and regulated their rights and privileges. For the third time, he functioned as ban of Slavonia between 1229 and 1235. Meanwhile, he held the position of judge royal for the queen, secondly, in 1232.

After the death of Andrew II in September 1235, Julius had been disgraced and was imprisoned by the new king, Béla IV of Hungary, who also confiscated all of his property. He died in captivity in 1237. Pope Gregory IX was already informed of his death by 22 January 1238, when instructed that the amount of money left by the "late" Ban Julius in favor of the Bosnian church and deposited with the Dominicans of Pécs be handed over to the newly appointed Bosnian bishop Ponsa. Julius I founded the Nekcseszentmárton (Martin, Croatia) estate of the Knights Templar.

== Identification ==
The above career is consistent and gapless, thus can refer to a single person, nevertheless it is not free from doubts: it may arise, that Julius during the rule of Emeric was a different person from Julius, baron of Andrew II, because of the political-historical conditions (prince Andrew rebelled against his older brother's reign). However this theory is can be eliminated by the possibility that Julius was also a secret supporter of prince Andrew, as many others.

It is neither reassuring that Julius' career began with too high positions, without the introductory section of smaller offices. Historian Mór Wertner identified all occurring Julius with the person from the kindred Kán during the first decades of the 13th century, unless he had no reason to act differently. In contrast, János Karácsonyi gave an overview about Julius I Kán's career from the year of 1219, when he was already easily distinguishable from Julius I Rátót, judge royal (1219–1221; 1235–1239) and voivode of Transylvania (1229–1231).

== Sources ==
- Béli, Gábor (2013). "Börtönviselés perbeli egyezség alapján a XIII. században [Imprisonment on the Basis of a Court Settlement in the 13th Century]". In Máthé, Gábor; Révész, T. Mihály; Gosztonyi, Gergely (eds.). Jogtörténeti Parerga. Ünnepi tanulmányok Mezey Barna 60. születésnapja tiszteletére (in Hungarian). ELTE Eötvös Kiadó. pp. 66–72. ISBN 978-963-312-166-5.
- Engel, Pál (2001). The Realm of St Stephen: A History of Medieval Hungary, 895–1526. I.B. Tauris Publishers. ISBN 1-86064-061-3.
- Gál, Judit (2020). Dalmatia and the Exercise of Royal Authority in the Árpád-Era Kingdom of Hungary. Arpadiana III., Research Centre for the Humanities. ISBN 978-963-416-227-8.
- Markó, László (2006). A magyar állam főméltóságai Szent Istvántól napjainkig: Életrajzi Lexikon [Great Officers of State in Hungary from King Saint Stephen to Our Days: A Biographical Encyclopedia] (in Hungarian). Helikon Kiadó. ISBN 963-208-970-7.
- Szőcs, Tibor (2014). A nádori intézmény korai története, 1000–1342 [An Early History of the Palatinal Institution: 1000–1342] (in Hungarian). Magyar Tudományos Akadémia Támogatott Kutatások Irodája. ISBN 978-963-508-697-9.
- Zsoldos, Attila (2011). Magyarország világi archontológiája, 1000–1301 [Secular Archontology of Hungary, 1000–1301] (in Hungarian). História, MTA Történettudományi Intézete. ISBN 978-963-9627-38-3.

Julius I Genus Kán Born: ? Died: 1237
Political offices
Preceded by Eth Geregye	Voivode of Transylvania; 1201	Succeeded by Nicholas I
Preceded by Achilles	Judge royal 1202–1204	Succeeded by Smaragd
Preceded by Marcellus Tétény	Judge royal 1212–1213	Succeeded by Martin Hont-Pázmány
Preceded by Martin Hont-Pázmány	Ban of Slavonia; 1213	Succeeded by Atyusz Atyusz
Preceded by Nicholas II	Voivode of Transylvania; 1214	Succeeded by Simon Kacsics
Preceded by Nicholas	Palatine of Hungary; 1215–1217/8	Succeeded by Nicholas Szák
Preceded by Bánk Bár-Kalán	Ban of Slavonia; 1219	Succeeded by Solomon Atyusz
Preceded by Theodore Csanád	Palatine of Hungary; 1222–1226	Succeeded by Nicholas Szák
Preceded by Thomas Monoszló	Ban of Slavonia; 1229–1235	Succeeded by Apaj Gutkeled
