= Esau, Palatine of Hungary =

Hungarian lord

Esau

Palatine of Hungary
- Reign: 1197–1198
- Predecessor: Mog
- Successor: Mog
- Died: after 1198

Esau (Hungarian: Ézsau; died after 1198) was a Hungarian lord in the second half of the 12th century, who served as Palatine of Hungary from 1197 to 1198.

It is possible he is identical with that namesake lord (Esew), who served as ispán of Bihar County from 1181 to 1183 (or 1186), during the reign of Béla III of Hungary. Esau was a confidant of Emeric, King of Hungary. Sometime between 1193 and 1197, he was made Palatine of Hungary. He functioned in this capacity until 1198, when Mog succeeded him. Beside his dignity, Esau also administered Bács County in the same period.

Despite the claims of earlier 19th-century historiography, Esau is not identical with contemporary namesake, who appears as Judge royal and ispán of Csanád County in the same period, between 1197 and 1198.

== Sources ==
- Markó, László (2006). A magyar állam főméltóságai Szent Istvántól napjainkig: Életrajzi Lexikon [Great Officers of State in Hungary from King Saint Stephen to Our Days: A Biographical Encyclopedia] (in Hungarian). Helikon Kiadó. ISBN 963-547-085-1.
- Zsoldos, Attila (2011). Magyarország világi archontológiája, 1000–1301 [Secular Archontology of Hungary, 1000–1301] (in Hungarian). História, MTA Történettudományi Intézete. ISBN 978-963-9627-38-3.

Political offices
Preceded by Mog	Palatine of Hungary; 1197–1198	Succeeded by Mog
