= Dáka =

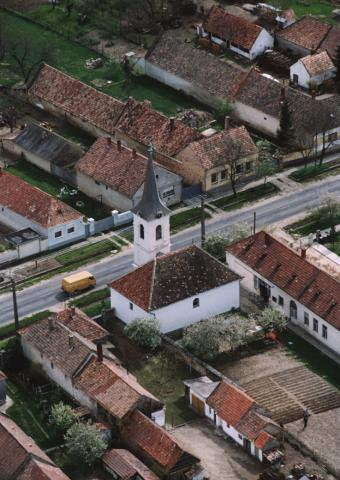
- Aerial photo of Dáka

- Flag Coat of arms

- Location of Dáka in Hungary
- Coordinates: 47.28775°N 17.42816°E
- Country: Hungary
- Region: Central Transdanubia
- County: Veszprém
- Subregion: Pápai
- Rank: Village

Area
  - Total: 25.40 km^{2} (9.81 sq mi)

Population (1 January 2008)
  - Total: 648
  - Density: 25.5/km^{2} (66.1/sq mi)
- Time zone: UTC+1 (CET)
  - Summer (DST): UTC+2 (CEST)
- Postal code: 8592
- Area code: +36 89
- KSH code: 20154
- Website: https://daka.hu/

Dáka is a village in Veszprém county, Hungary.
