= Johann Christian von Engel =

Austrian historian

Johann Christian von Engel (17 October 1770 - 20 March 1814) was an Austrian historian of Ukrainian, Romanian, Hungarian, Croatian, and German history.

== Biography ==
He was born in Leutschau (today Levoča, Slovakia), then belonging to Kingdom of Hungary under Habsburg monarchy, and received his education at the University of Göttingen, where Heyne and Schlözer were among his teachers. He wrote several historical works which in their day were treasure houses of knowledge and scholarship. He was the first to put the history of Hungary, Ukraine, and the Danubian principalities on a sound scholarly basis. In 1812 he was ennobled.

== Works ==
His greatest works are Die Geschichte der Ukraine und der ukrainische Kosaken, wie auch der Königreiche Halitsch-Wladimir ("History of Ukraine and the Ukrainian Cossacks, along with the Kingdom of Halych-Volodymyr", Halle 1796) Geschichte des ungarischen Reiches und seine Nebenländer (“History of imperial Hungary and neighboring lands,” 5 vols., 1797–1804); Geschichte der Moldau und Walachey (Halle, 1804) and Geschichte des Königreichs Ungarn (“History of the kingdom of Hungary,” 5 vols., 1814).
