= Velislav =

Velislav may refer to:

- Velislav, Burgas Province, a village in Bulgaria
- Velislav, a Slavic given name; notable people include:
  - Velislav the Canon, 14th-century notary, the commissioner of the Velislaus Bible
  - Velislav Vasilev, Bulgarian football player
  - Velislav Vutsov, Bulgarian football manager

== See also ==
- Veleslav
