= Vejte Csanád =

Hungarian lord, who served as Judge royal

Vejte (I) Csanád

Judge royal
- Reign: 1199–1200
- Predecessor: Mika Ják
- Successor: Achilles
- Died: after 1200
- Noble family: gens Csanád
- Spouse: unknown
- Issue: Theodore; Vejte II; Ladislaus

Vejte (I) from the kindred Csanád (Hungarian: Csanád nembeli (I.) Vejte; died after 1200) was a Hungarian lord, who served as Judge royal between 1199 and 1200, during the reign of Emeric, King of Hungary.

Vejte (also Wetich or Vetuk) was born into the Csanád clan which originated from Csanád, who defeated provincial lord Ajtony, an enemy of Stephen I of Hungary in the early 11th century. Vejte had three sons. Theodore was the Palatine of Hungary in 1222; Vejte (II) married Lucia, the daughter of Pousa Bár-Kalán; and Ladislaus, who served as ispán of Csanád County in 1234.

He was first mentioned as ispán of Csanád County in 1199. Beside the position of Judge royal, he also served as ispán of Nyitra County from 1199 to 1200. After that he was the first known ispán of Krassó County in 1200.

== Sources ==
- (in Hungarian) Markó, László (2006). A magyar állam főméltóságai Szent Istvántól napjainkig – Életrajzi Lexikon ("The High Officers of the Hungarian State from Saint Stephen to the Present Days – A Biographical Encyclopedia") (2nd edition); Helikon Kiadó Kft., Budapest; ISBN 963-547-085-1
- (in Hungarian) Zsoldos, Attila (2011). Magyarország világi archontológiája, 1000–1301 ("Secular Archontology of Hungary, 1000–1301"). História, MTA Történettudományi Intézete. Budapest. ISBN 978-963-9627-38-3

Vejte I Genus Csanád Born: ? Died: after 1200
Political offices
Preceded by Mika Ják	Judge royal 1199–1200	Succeeded by Achilles
