= Brothers' Quarrel (Hungary) =

War of succession in Hungary

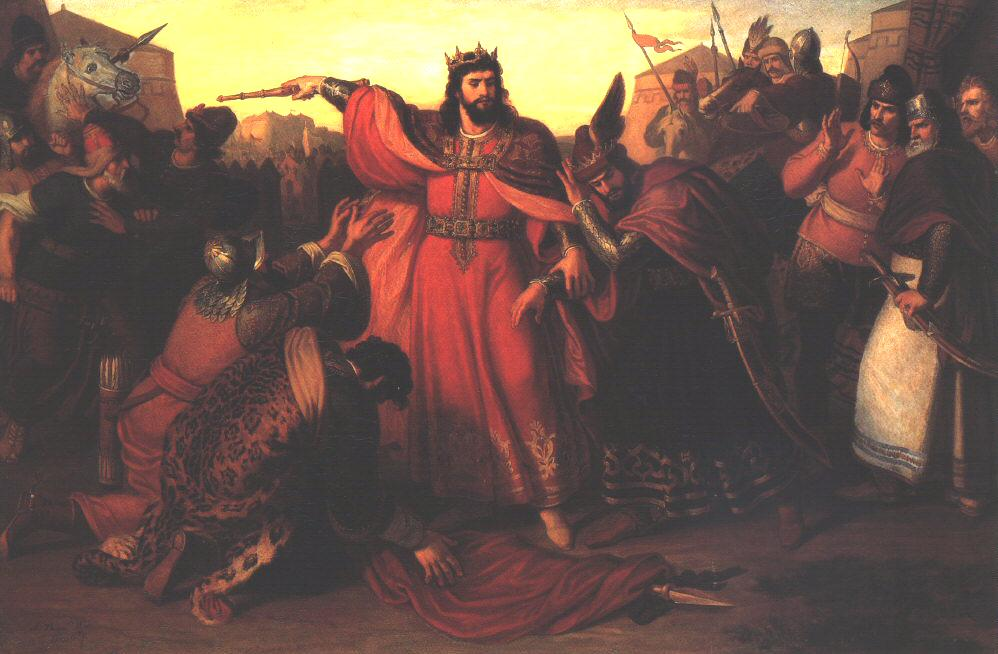
- Emeric captures his rebellious younger brother Andrew, painted by Mór Than in 1857
Date	1197–1203
Location	Kingdom of Hungary (clashes in Slavonia, Transdanubia) (with spillover to Austria and Styria in 1199)
Result	1197 (Andrew's victory); 1199 (Emeric's victory); 1203 (Emeric's victory)

Belligerents
Emeric, King of Hungary; Supported by: Holy See	Andrew, Duke of Slavonia; Supported by: Duchy of Austria (1197–99); Duchy of Merania (1203)

Commanders and leaders
Mika Ják; Bishop Ugrin Csák; Mog (pre-1199); Benedict; Nicholas; Julius Kán; Vejte Csanád; Ipoch Bogátradvány	Ban Andrew; Bishop Boleslaus of Vác; Bishop Elvin of Várad; Abbot John of Pannonhalma; Nicholas; Martin Hont-Pázmány; Mog (post-1199)

The Brothers' Quarrel (Hungarian: testvérviszály) was a war of succession within the Árpád dynasty between Emeric, the King of Hungary, and his younger brother, Andrew, Duke of Slavonia. It lasted from 1197 to 1203, covering almost the entire reign of Emeric. The conflict had a significant impact on the development of the 13th-century society and political system in the Kingdom of Hungary.

== Background ==
The illustrious Béla III ruled Hungary from 1172 to 1196. His first wife was Agnes of Antioch, the mother of all of his children. Their first child, a boy named Emeric, was born in 1174. Andrew, the second son of Béla III and Agnes, was born around 1177. Béla and Agnes had two other sons, Solomon and Stephen. One of them was still alive in early 1198.

In order to ensure the uninterrupted succession to the Hungarian throne, Béla III decided to crown his eldest son during his lifetime. Emeric was crowned king while still a child by Nicholas, Archbishop of Esztergom, on 16 May 1182. This method was unusual within the Árpád dynasty, which was plagued by many struggles for the throne throughout its history. After Solomon (1057) and Stephen II (1105), Emeric was the third heir to be crowned King of Hungary during the lifetime of his father, the reigning monarch. Béla III appointed Emeric to administer Croatia and Dalmatia around 1193 or 1194. Historian Gyula Kristó claimed Emeric's coronation in 1182 was forced against his father by the most powerful barons of the realm. In contrast, Szabados argued that Emeric did not independently issue a royal charter and did not have his own court. Bálint Hóman claimed that Béla III crowned his eldest son as co-monarch in the manner of the Byzantine emperors. Croatian historian Ferdo Šišić believed that Emeric was crowned as King of Croatia and Dalmatia in 1194, separately.

Following Béla III's successful invasion of the Principality of Halych in 1188, his younger son Andrew was installed as Prince of Halych. His nominal reign was unpopular and the loyal boyars expelled Andrew and his retinue from the principality in August 1189 or 1190. Upon his return to Hungary, Andrew did not receive a new duchy from his father, who only gave him some money, as well as some fortresses and estates in Slavonia. On his deathbed, Béla III, who had pledged to lead a crusade to the Holy Land, ordered Andrew to fulfill his vow. Béla III died on 23 April 1196, and Emeric succeeded him as King of Hungary without opposition.

== Dynastic conflict ==
=== Andrew's first conspiracy (1197) ===
[Béla III] left castles and large estates to his second son [Andrew], and provided incalculable wealth for his journey to Jerusalem, to which he himself had made a vow. After the death of the young man's father, when his power became unlimited, as is so often the case at this age, he quickly used the money he received in a wasteful and frivolous manner. Therefore, when his supplies for the usual luxuries ran out, he decided with his men to occupy his brother's [Emeric's] kingdom.

— Chronica regia Coloniensis

[...] After your father [Béla III] died, you [Andrew] pretended to set out for Jerusalem, forgetting the journey you had undertaken, which you should have led against the enemies of the Cross, turned your army against your brother, the king of Hungary [Emeric], and did much against the royal majesty by the advice of ill-wishers.

— The letter of the newly crowned Pope Innocent III to Duke Andrew (29 January 1198)

Andrew used the funds that he inherited from his father to recruit supporters among the Hungarian lords. It is plausible that he demanded from his brother to install him as Duke of Slavonia, which, by the second half of the 12th century, increasingly became the traditional title of heir to the throne. Andrew also formed an alliance with Leopold VI, Duke of Austria, and plotted against Emeric. The king learned of the conspiracy and filed a complaint against his brother to Pope Celestine III, who threatened excommunication for those who supported the duke against Emeric. The united troops of Andrew and Leopold attacked and routed the Hungarian royal army at Mački (Macsek), Slavonia, in the late autumn of 1197. Under duress, King Emeric might have gave Croatia and Dalmatia to Andrew as an appanage. Regardless, a series of privilege letters in favor of Dalmatian coastal cities and ecclesiastical institutions prove that King Emeric intended to exercise his royal rights as King of Croatia and Dalmatia, whether Andrew held the ducal title or not.

In practice, Andrew administered Croatia and Dalmatia as an independent and sovereign monarch. He styled himself, "By the grace of God, Duke of Zadar and of all Dalmatia, Croatia and Hum" in his charters. Taking advantage of Miroslav of Hum's death, Andrew invaded Hum and occupied at least the land between the Cetina and Neretva rivers sometime before May 1198. Andrew minted coins, granted land and confirmed privileges in his territories. In accordance with the treaty with Emeric, the counties of Varaždin and Bodrog also belonged to his suzerainty. To further solidify his power, Andrew cooperated with the Frankopans, Babonići, and other local lords. Some of the prominent barons also supported his aspirations, including Macarius Monoszló and Andrew, Ban of Slavonia, the husband of princess Margaret (the aunt of Emeric and Andrew). Andrew also appointed his own bans, neglecting Emeric's royal prerogatives. Andrew acted as "caput ecclesiae in regno suo" (head of the church in his own country) over the Dalmatian ecclesiastical institutions, having previously he donated privileges to the Archdiocese of Split and the St. John monastery at Biograd in 1198. He also attempted to fill the then-vacant archiepiscopal sees of Split and Zadar with prelates who were loyal to him through elections in 1198. Pope Innocent III, who strongly supported Emeric in his feud against Andrew, refused to confirm these elections, and ordered investigation regarding the candidates' political relationship with the duke. In later years, the Holy See successfully prevented Andrew's partisans from occupying the ecclesiastical positions in Dalmatia. Overall, the local churches and cities attempted to maintain their neutrality during the feud between Emeric and Andrew. In several cases, the two brothers both issued the same grant to a particular church, since the clerics felt important to get confirmation both from their in order to keep the safeguard their rights and neutrality. Blaise, the chief notary of Zadar acknowledged Emeric as "our sovereign", while Andrew was referred to as only "duke" then "the king's brother, who is present in Dalmatia".

Pope Innocent III also instructed the archbishops and bishops of Hungary that no one should excommunicate or interdict the king's confidants, especially his chief supporter since his father's death, Ugrin Csák, Bishop of Győr. Weeks after his election, Innocent III sent a letter to Andrew on 29 January 1198, in which he urged Andrew to lead a crusade to the Holy Land in order to fulfill his vow. He threatened that if Andrew refused to fulfill his father's last will, he would be excommunicated and lose his status as heir to the Hungarian throne in favor of his younger brother, Solomon or Stephen (Andrew was the heir because Emeric did not have a child then).

=== Andrew's second conspiracy (1198–1199) ===
"[...] It really got to Our ears, that in the first week of the past Lent, on the Wednesday of Ember days [10 March 1199], in the evening gloom, when Our Reverend Brother, [Boleslaus], the Bishop of Vác sang Compline with his fellow canons, you [Emeric], arriving to the Vác Cathedral, ordered them to hand over the keys of the sanctuary to you and the bishop [Boleslaus] leave the church [cathedral]; and when he was afraid of the trap set against him, as it gave rise to very strong suspicion for the [late] hour, he was reluctant to obey the royal command, you ordered: the gate of the sanctuary shall be broken by force; and when this bishop and the canons, for this reason, turned to the Lord and began to sing amid tears: »O Lord, look down from thine holy house, and consider us: bow down thine ear, O Lord, to hear us.« [Bar. 2,16], you took amiss that they were begging for divine help, and rushed at the bishop, dragging him down from the top staircase, which is in front of the altar, all the way to the floor paving by force, and the bishop, throwing down to the floor, was handed over to your no less violent [soldiers] in order to drag out from the church [cathedral]. So after you forcibly threw him out of the church [cathedral], and you left him half-dead and thereafter, you ordered to crack the lock of the treasury, seize the treasures of the church [cathedral] and confiscate of your own free will the patrimony of this bishop, who graciously donated it to a certain monastic house he newly founded [Lelesz Provostry]. Thereafter, when this bishop forbade the performance of worship services in the cathedral humiliated in this way, you refused to pay tithe [to his diocese], and under threat of penalty of blinding, you forbade his envoys to attempt to leave the kingdom, preventing their complaint from reaching the Apostolic See. [...]"

— Pope Innocent III's letter to King Emeric (21 June 1199)

"[...] Because Your Holiness have supreme power and authority after God [...], We will reveal to Your Highness the injustices committed against Our Majesty by some disingenuous [...] prelates, who stirred up Our brother [Andrew] [...] against Us. Among them, [Bishops] Boleslaus, Elvin and John of Veszprém stand out from the rest in terms of their perfidy, [they] raged more fiercely and more openly against Us. One of them, Bishop [Boleslaus] of Vác, ahead of Our grounded complaint on violation of Our person, lied that [..., see above], in a false way, of course. Since, the said bishop was caught many times in the sin of betrayal, and we were informed [the following] on the part of his owns [prelates]: letters written for the purpose of causing confusion against Us, which were sent by Our brother and other unfaithful ones, or their reply letters from the bishop himself; in addition he [Boleslaus] keeps the money collected for Our brother. Investigating the truth of these things, We go to the church of Vác along with Our courtiers. [...] We peacefully asked to open the chamber [treasury] which was said to have hidden the treasure of the unfaithful. After [Boleslaus] did not comply with Our request, greater suspicion arose within Us. That is why We strongly warned him to open the chamber to overcome the suspicion of infidelity. [...] Not only did he refuse to open the chamber, but he even offended Our Royal Majesty with a number of insults and blasphemous words, insomuch he even called Us an evildoer. After that, We instructed the treasurer to open the chamber; leaving the treasures of the church completely intact in the presence of the canons, We found the letters written for Our peril and took them to Ourselves, and sent to you by the couriers of the present letter. [...]"

— King Emeric's reply letter to Pope Innocent III

Despite the clear position of the Holy See, several prelates supported Andrew. In January 1198, Pope Innocent III had rebuked John, the abbot of Pannonhalma for conspiring with the duke against Emeric and ordered him to appear before the Roman Curia in person. However, the conspiracy continued against the king, which escalated in the spring of 1199. One of the pro-Andrew prelates, Boleslaus, Bishop of Vác complained to the Roman Curia that while the bishop and his canons celebrated a mass at the cathedral of Vác on 10 March 1199, Emeric and his soldiers violently broke into the building. The king himself physically assaulted Boleslaus, while his troops broke the lock, looted the treasury and confiscated numerous documents, which allegedly contained the preparations for a planned conspiracy against the monarch. Pope Innocent sent a letter to Emeric on 21 June 1199, in which he called on the king to reimburse the material damage to the cathedral and to compensate Boleslaus, unless he will impose an ecclesiastical penalty on Emeric (excommunication) and the kingdom (interdict). On the same day, Pope Innocent instructed Saul Győr, the Archbishop of Kalocsa to investigate the events and oversee that the king is carrying out the compensation. Initially, Emeric prevented the visitation of Saul to the royal court, hindering his mission.

Emeric denied any physical abuse in his reply letter, according to him, the canons of the cathedral chapter voluntarily opened the gate, and Boleslaus' involvement in the conspiracy was revealed. The king narrated in his letter to Pope Innocent that the bishop maintained relationship and corresponded with Duke Andrew and the other conspirators, and guarded their group's funds at the cathedral of Vác in order to finance their rebellion against Emeric. Since after the incident and the subsequent civil war, several barons defected to the court of Duke Andrew, it is plausible the king had good reason to open the cathedral treasury, according to Szabados. In his letter, Emeric also narrated that Mog, Palatine of Hungary secretly swore loyalty to Andrew, but he was deprived of his office, when his betrayal was revealed. Mog's defection encouraged Andrew to rebel against his rule and make an attempt to gain the Hungarian throne. When Emeric attempted to appoint his partisan Mika Ják as the new palatine, Boleslaus' brother, Elvin, Bishop of Várad excommunicated the lord, because he had formerly captured one of the bishopric's priests, who functioned as a messenger of the king's enemies who supported Duke Andrew. Emeric claimed the neglect of Saul Győr was due to the safety of the archbishop, whose lives would have been endangered by the adherents of the pro-Andrew prelates in the royal court.

After the plot was uncovered, a civil war broke out between Emeric and Andrew. During the clashes, the Diocese of Zagreb (in Slavonia) suffered heavy damage. In the summer of 1199, royal troops routed Andrew's army in the valley of Rád near Lake Balaton in Somogy County, and Andrew fled to Austria, where Duke Leopold sheltered him and his retinue. In retaliation, Emeric's advancing army ransacked and plundered the Austrian and Styrian border region along Hungary. Thereafter, Emeric took steps to bring Croatia and Dalmatia back under his control. He appointed his former tutor Bernard of Perugia, the Archbishop of Split as the royal governor of the coastal city. The name of Andrew disappeared from the datation style as used by notaries of Dalmatian cities, including Zadar in the second half of 1199. Emeric also installed his partisans Nicholas then Benedict as bans of Croatia and Dalmatia. For the losses of his diocese, Emeric compensated Dominic, Bishop of Zagreb with several privileges and tax exemptions in 1199–1200.

=== First reconciliation (1200–1203) ===
The most important matter for Pope Innocent was the initiation of the crusade, so he urged reconciliation between the two brothers. The Chronica regia Coloniensis narrates that the pope sent Conrad of Wittelsbach, the Archbishop of Mainz from Italy to Hungary in order to mediate between Emeric and Andrew. The parties held a meeting and came to an agreement with Leopold, and all the nobles of Hungary, and thus concluded a peace: both Emeric and Andrew vowed to launch a crusade to the Holy Land, while Hungary was entrusted to the guardianship of Leopold on their departure. And if one of them perishes in overseas parts, the surviving brother shall possess the father's kingdom upon his return (i.e. Emeric still did not have a son). In a papal letter with the date March 1200, Cardinal Gregorius de Crescentio also appeared as a negotiator during the brothers' reconciliation. The report of the Continuatio Claustroneuburgensis says that "the king of Hungary made peace with the duke of Austria and accepted his younger brother back into the joint reign" in 1200. Austrian historian Alfons Huber considered this meant a return to the previous territorial separation, so Andrew did not become co-ruler. Szabados viewed Pope Innocent III as the real beneficiary of the treaty, which reflects the growing influence of the Holy See over Hungary. For Innocent, it seemed much more reassuring that the launch of the much-advocated crusade did not depend solely on a frivolous prince, but also that the monarch of an important European power had sworn to take part in the holy war.

The peace treaty of 1200 resulted that Andrew not only re-established his power in Croatia and Dalmatia, but emerged stronger than ever. For instance, in charters issued by Blaise, the notary of Zadar, the name of Emeric is not mentioned at all, while Andrew is styled as "our lord" together with his ducal titles. From the fall of 1200, Andrew's own charters have survived in the region. He again installed bans to administer his province – at first Nicholas then Martin Hont-Pázmány. The ex-palatine Mog also belonged to his entourage. The reconciliation brought three years of peace to Slavonia and Croatia. Andrew might have started minting coins during this time. He married Gertrude of Merania sometime between 1200 and 1203; his father-in-law Berthold owned extensive domains in the Holy Roman Empire along the borders of Andrew's duchy. Gertrude's influence and political involvement are clearly shown by the fact that when Emeric defeated his brother again in 1203 (see below), he found it necessary to send Gertrude back to her native land Merania.

Emeric pursued an active foreign policy in the Balkans after 1200, since Pope Innocent urged him to take measures to liquidate the "heretics" in Bosnia. Although he pledged himself to join the Fourth Crusade, the crusaders (mostly Venetians), however, besieged and captured Zadar in November 1202. Pope Innocent was informed in early 1203 that Emeric prepared for a crusade. Therefore, the pope gestured for the king in February 1203: under the burden of excommunication, he ordered the ecclesiastical and secular dignitaries to swear loyalty to the legal heir to the Hungarian throne, the child Ladislaus (who was born sometime after 1200). Innocent later heard similar news from Andrew in early November 1203. The pope declared that he would place all Andrew's possessions and wealth, which he rightfully possessed, under the protection of the Holy See, and would protect them until he received news of his return or death. He also declared that if Andrew had a son in the meantime, that child would inherit the duchy. However, Innocent's last letter proved to be out of date, as by then another conflict had arisen between the two brothers.

=== Scene of Varaždin (1203) ===
[All] the magnates of the kingdom and almost the whole of the Hungarian army deserted [King Emeric] and unlawfully sided with Duke Andrew. Very few men indeed remained with the king, and even they were terrified at the extent of the insurrection and did not dare to urge the king to hope for success, but rather advised him to flee. Then it happened that one day both sides had drawn close to each other and were beginning to prepare themselves in earnest for battle. ... [After] much wise thought, with inspiration from heaven [King Emeric] found a successful way by which he might recover his right to the kingdom and still remain guiltless of bloodshed. So he said to his men, "Stay here a while, and do not follow me." Then he laid down his weapons, and taking only a leafy bough in his hand he walked slowly into the enemy ranks. As he passed through the midst of the armed multitude, he cried out in a loud and strong voice, "Now I shall see who will dare to raise a hand to shed the blood of the royal lineage!" Seeing him, all fell back, and not daring even to mutter, they left a wide passage for him on either side. And then when [King Emeric] reached his brother, he took him, and leading him outside the body of troops, he sent him to a certain castle for custody.

— Thomas the Archdeacon: History of the Bishops of Salona and Split

The relationship between the two brothers led to a third conflict in the fall of 1203, but the circumstances of its outbreak are unclear due to conflicting information. The Continuatio Claustroneuburgensis narrates that "Emeric, the king of Hungary – even though he gave his word to his brother through monks – tricked him into captivity and imprisoned him [Andrew] forever". Italian scholar Boncompagno da Signa's tractate Rhetorica novissima contains a letter of Duke Leopold VI of Austria, in which the monarch mentions that Emeric imprisoned Andrew "for no reason". The Annals of Admont records that Emeric crowned his child Ladislaus, "who was not even three years old", imprisoned Andrew, "suspecting that he is preparing to attack the realm", and guarded him in the palace of Esztergom. Emeric also expelled Andrew's spouse Gertrude into her homeland and stripped of her possessions. Thomas the Archdeacon tells a different story in his chronicle Historia Salonitana decades later: accordingly, Duke Andrew once again rose up in open rebellion against Emeric. Their armies met at Varaždin (Varasd) in Slavonia on the river Drava in October 1203. Emeric walked into his brother's camp unarmed, stating, "Now I shall see who will dare to raise a hand to shed the blood of the royal lineage!" Nobody ventured to stop the king; thus, he approached Andrew and seized him without resistance.

It is highly disputed among historians which narration to accept as authentic. 19th-century scholar Gyula Pauler combined the records, considering that, with an ulterior motive, Emeric called his younger brother to consult, where upon his arrival, he captured him with the royal scepter in hand without bloodshed. His contemporary Flórián Mátyás accepted the Claustroneuburgensis tradition, while Gyula Kristó presented both versions without taking a position. In contrast, György Szabados accepted Thomas the Archdeacon's narration as reliable. He considered that the Continuatio Claustroneuburgensis represents a pro-Andrew point of view and Emeric's death is listed twice both times under the wrong date (1203 and 1205), thus the authenticity of the narration is debatable. He argued, although the Historia Salonitana represents a pro-Emeric position, but the work itself was compiled sometime around 1266, when Emeric and his branch died out a long time ago (in 1205), therefore, there was no reason to distort the truth. Pope Innocent's letter also proves that preparations for military campaign took place in Hungary during 1203, but instead of joining the Fourth Crusade, a war took place between the two brothers. Tamás Körmendi rejected Szabados' argument. He emphasized that the subsequent letters of Pope Innocent do not mention the fact of warfare between the two brothers, and the pointiff even reprimanded Emeric in his letter of September 1204 for imprisoning his younger brother. In addition, Thomas the Archdeacon does not mention the preparation for the crusade at all in his narrative. Körmendi argued the chronicler mostly used the historical records and charters of the cathedral chapter of Split as main sources of his work. This documents perhaps represented a staunch pro-Emeric standpoint, because Bernard of Perugia, the former tutor of the king served as Archbishop of Split during the brothers' quarrel. Croatian historian Mladen Ančić emphasized the allegorical character of the story. The chronicler did not aim to provide authentic information in this case, but wished to express an idealized image of royal power. Attila Zsoldos argued it was the king who turned against his brother's province with an army initially convened for a crusade due to existing mistrust. Following Andrew's arrest, Emeric installed his partisan Ipoch Bogátradvány as the new Ban of Croatia and Dalmatia.

== Aftermath ==
Andrew was first imprisoned in the fort of Gornji Kneginec (Kene), then in Esztergom. Having fallen seriously ill, Emeric wanted to ensure the succession of his four-year-old son, Ladislaus. His staunch supporter Ugrin Csák was elected Archbishop of Esztergom in the spring of 1204. Pope Innocent authorized Ugrin to crown Ladislaus and to invalidate the ill Emeric's pilgrimage oath to the Holy Land in April 1204. Meanwhile, Andrew was freed from captivity in the early months of 1204. It is uncertain whether Andrew was liberated by his partisans – including Alexander Hont-Pázmány – or his release took place with Emeric's consent. As Ladislaus was crowned only in August 1204, it is plausible that Emeric decided on Andrew's release, therefore, the coronation was not vitally urgent. Andrew reconciled with his dying brother, who entrusted him with "the guardianship of his son and the administration of the entire kingdom until the ward should reach the age of majority".

Emeric died on 30 November 1204. The child Ladislaus III ascended the Hungarian throne under the regency of his uncle, Duke Andrew. The subsequent letters of Pope Innocent III suggest that serious tensions burdened the relationship between Andrew and the queen mother Constance of Aragon after Emeric's death. Andrew confiscated a significant portion of private wealth from Constance and had free control over the royal treasury. Constance fled from Hungary, taking her son and the Holy Crown to Austria in the spring of 1205. According to the Annals of Admont, "some bishops and nobles" escorted them, breaking through the blockade that Andrew erected along the Austrian border. Andrew prepared for a war against Leopold VI, but Ladislaus III suddenly died in Vienna on 7 May 1205. Twenty-two days later, Andrew II was crowned King of Hungary. His descendants ruled Hungary and Croatia until the extinction of the Árpád dynasty in 1301 and even further on the maternal side.

== Impact ==
Taking advantage of the civil war in Hungary, Kaloyan of Bulgaria invaded and captured Belgrade, Barancs (now Braničevo in Serbia), and other fortresses in 1204. Emeric made preparations for a campaign against Bulgaria, but he disbanded his army upon Pope Innocent's demand. The pope, who had been negotiating a church union with Kaloyan, sent a royal crown to him, but Emeric imprisoned the papal legate who was delivering the crown to Bulgaria when the legate was passing through Hungary.

Unlike the former claimants to the Hungarian throne, for instance Prince Álmos, Boris Kalamanos and Géza, son of Géza II of Hungary, Andrew could not count on the support of one of the great powers of the region, i.e. the Holy Roman Empire and the Byzantine Empire because of their anarchic domestic conditions, the German throne dispute and the chaotic rule of the Angelos dynasty, respectively. Consequently, in his rebellion against the king, his brother Emeric, he had to rely on the support of the Hungarian nobles to a much greater extent than his predecessors who claimed the throne. An increase in the donation of royal estates into private hands after his coronation, and thus the change in the Hungarian social structure, may be a sign of subsequent gratitude and payment. In addition, Andrew also had to realize that he could not do without the expertise of Emeric's former barons in governance. For his staunch supporters, a younger generation of the elite, Andrew established new court positions (i.e. Master of the horse). The fault line between the members of the "old" and the "new" elites became permanent, and the exclusivity of royal power ceased.

== Sources ==
=== Primary sources ===
- Archdeacon Thomas of Split: History of the Bishops of Salona and Split (Latin text by Olga Perić, edited, translated and annotated by Damir Karbić, Mirjana Matijević Sokol and James Ross Sweeney) (2006). CEU Press. ISBN 963-7326-59-6.

=== Secondary sources ===
- Gál, Judit (2020). Dalmatia and the Exercise of Royal Authority in the Árpád-Era Kingdom of Hungary. Arpadiana III., Research Centre for the Humanities. ISBN 978-963-416-227-8.
- Körmendi, Tamás (2019). Az 1196–1235 közötti magyar történelem nyugati elbeszélő forrásainak kritikája [A Criticism of Western Narrative Sources for the History of Hungary in the period between 1196 and 1235] (in Hungarian). MTA Bölcsészettudományi Kutatóközpont Történettudományi Intézet. ISBN 978-963-416-163-9.
- Körmendi, Tamás (2020). "The Struggle between King Emeric of Hungary and Duke Andrew in Dalmatia (1197–1203)". Stefan the First-Crowned and His Time. Belgrade: Institute of History. pp. 195–211. ISBN 978-86-7743-139-6.
- Kristó, Gyula (1979). A feudális széttagolódás Magyarországon [Feudal Anarchy in Hungary] (in Hungarian). Akadémiai Kiadó. ISBN 963-05-1595-4.
- Pauler, Gyula (1899). A magyar nemzet története az Árpád-házi királyok alatt, II. [The History of the Hungarian Nation during the Árpádian Kings, Vol. 2.] (in Hungarian). Athenaeum.
- Szabados, György (1999). "Imre és András [Emeric and Andrew]". Századok (in Hungarian). 133 (1). Magyar Történelmi Társulat: 85–111. ISSN 0039-8098.
- Thoroczkay, Gábor, ed. (2018). Írott források az 1116–1205 közötti magyar történelemről [Written Sources of the Hungarian History between 1116 and 1205] (in Hungarian). Szegedi Középkorász Műhely. ISBN 978-615-80398-3-3.
- Zsoldos, Attila (2022). Az Aranybulla királya [The King of the Golden Bull] (in Hungarian). Városi Levéltár és Kutatóintézet. ISBN 978-963-8406-26-2.
