= Nicholas I of Transylvania =

Hungarian nobleman

Nicholas I

Voivode of Transylvania
- Reign: 1201(–1202)
- Predecessor: Julius Kán
- Successor: Benedict, son of Korlát
- Died: after 1203
- Issue: Stephen

Nicholas I (Hungarian: Miklós; died after 1203) was a Hungarian distinguished nobleman, who held several secular positions during the reign of Emeric, King of Hungary.

He was first mentioned as ispán (comes) of Sopron County in 1198. As a confidant of Emeric, he served as ban of Slavonia and besides that ispán of Zala County from 1198 to 1199 (while Emeric's brother, the rebellious Duke Andrew appointed a parallel ban, Andrew). He also functioned as ispán of Bihar County in that same year, in 1199.

Nicholas was appointed voivode of Transylvania in 1201. According to a non-authentic charter he also served as voivode in 1202. Later he held the position of ispán of Újvár County in 1203.

As a loyal supporter of King Emeric, his person undoubtedly was not the same as the other Nicholas, who served as the first palatine for Andrew II of Hungary, Emeric's brother and rival in the throne fights. Consequently, Nicholas, the ban of Slavonia for Prince Andrew in 1200 was also a different baron. However, it is possible that a Nicholas, who functioned as ispán of Szatmár County in 1181, marked voivode Nicholas' early political career. His son Stephen was a member of the entourage of Duke Béla in 1220.

== Sources ==
- Engel, Pál (2001). The Realm of St Stephen: A History of Medieval Hungary, 895-1526. I.B. Tauris Publishers. ISBN 1-86064-061-3.
- (in Hungarian) Zsoldos, Attila (2011). Magyarország világi archontológiája, 1000–1301 ("Secular Archontology of Hungary, 1000–1301"). História, MTA Történettudományi Intézete. Budapest. ISBN 978-963-9627-38-3

Political offices
Preceded by Andrew	Ban of Slavonia; 1198–1199	Succeeded by Benedict
Preceded by Julius Kán	Voivode of Transylvania; 1201(–1202)	Succeeded by Benedict, son of Korlát
