= Vérteskethely =

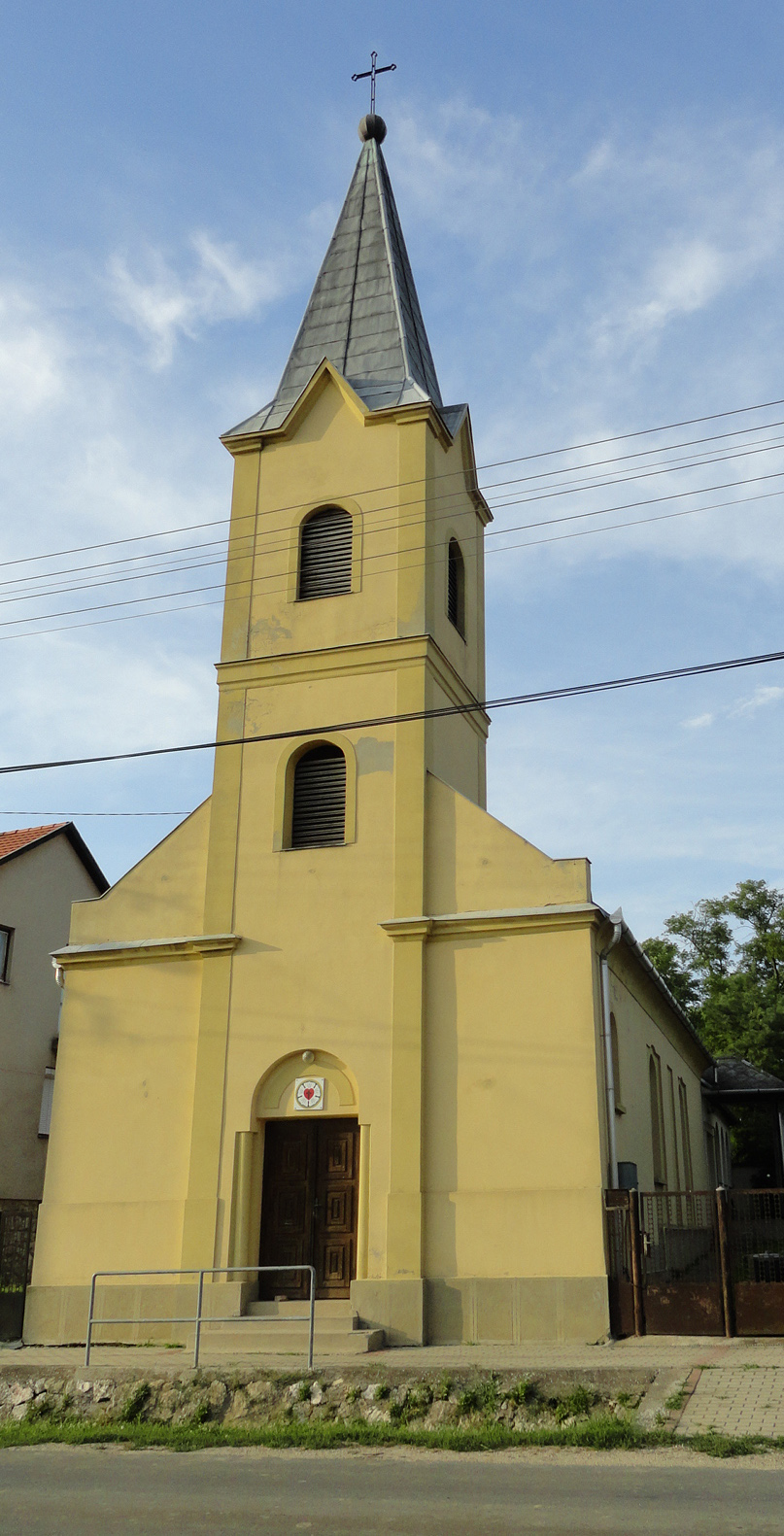
- The Lutheran church

- Flag Coat of arms

- Location of Komárom-Esztergom county in Hungary

- Location of Vérteskethely
- Coordinates: 47.48721°N 18.08347°E
- Country: Hungary
- County: Komárom-Esztergom

Area
  - Total: 17.48 km^{2} (6.75 sq mi)

Population (2004)
  - Total: 597
  - Density: 34.15/km^{2} (88.4/sq mi)
- Time zone: UTC+1 (CET)
  - Summer (DST): UTC+2 (CEST)
- Postal code: 2859
- Area code: 34

Vérteskethely is a village in Komárom-Esztergom county, Hungary.
