= Mannersdorf an der Rabnitz =

- Municipality
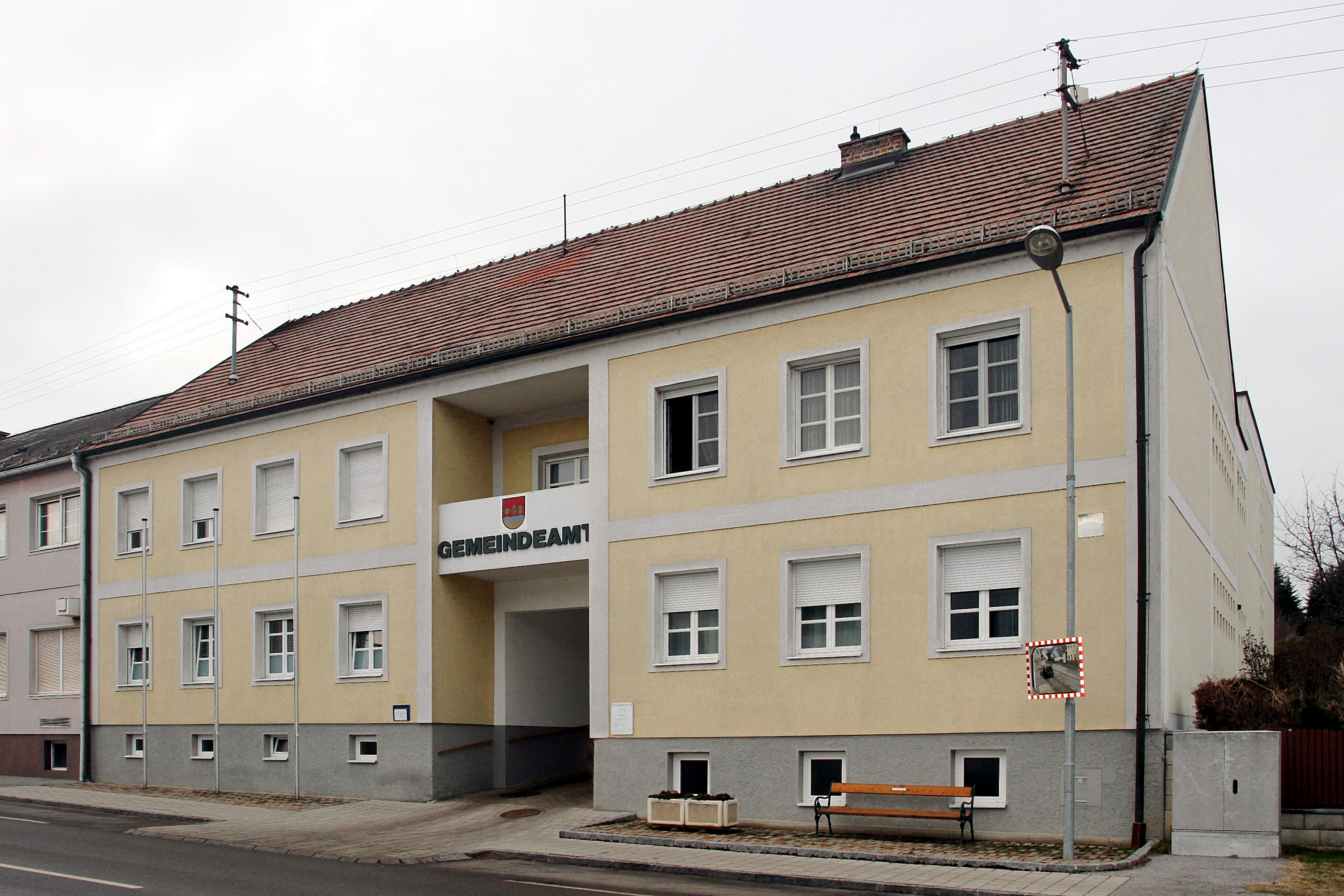
- Municipal office

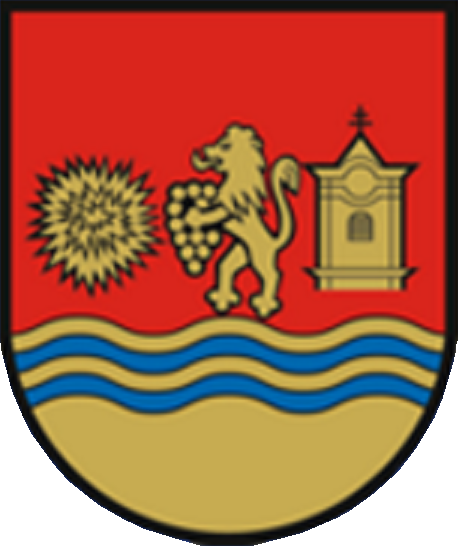
- Coat of arms

- Location within Burgenland Location within Austria
- Coordinates: 47°28′N 16°38′E
- Country: Austria
- State: Burgenland
- District: Oberpullendorf

Government
  - Mayor: Johann-Georg Horvath (ÖVP)

Area
  - Total: 38.42 km^{2} (14.83 sq mi)

Population (2018-01-01)
  - Total: 1,795
  - Density: 46.72/km^{2} (121.0/sq mi)
- Time zone: UTC+1 (CET)
  - Summer (DST): UTC+2 (CEST)
- Postal code: 7444
- Website: www.mannersdorf-adr.at

Mannersdorf an der Rabnitz (Croatian: Malištrof, Hungarian: Répcekethely) is a municipality in the district of Oberpullendorf in the Austrian state of Burgenland.

== Geography ==
The municipality includes the following settlements:

- Klostermarienberg
- Unterloisdorf
- Mannersdorf
- Rattersdorf
- Liebing

On 29 March 1945, Soviet commander Fyodor Tolbukhin's troops crossed the former Austrian border at Klostermarienberg in Burgenland..There is a monument to the event.

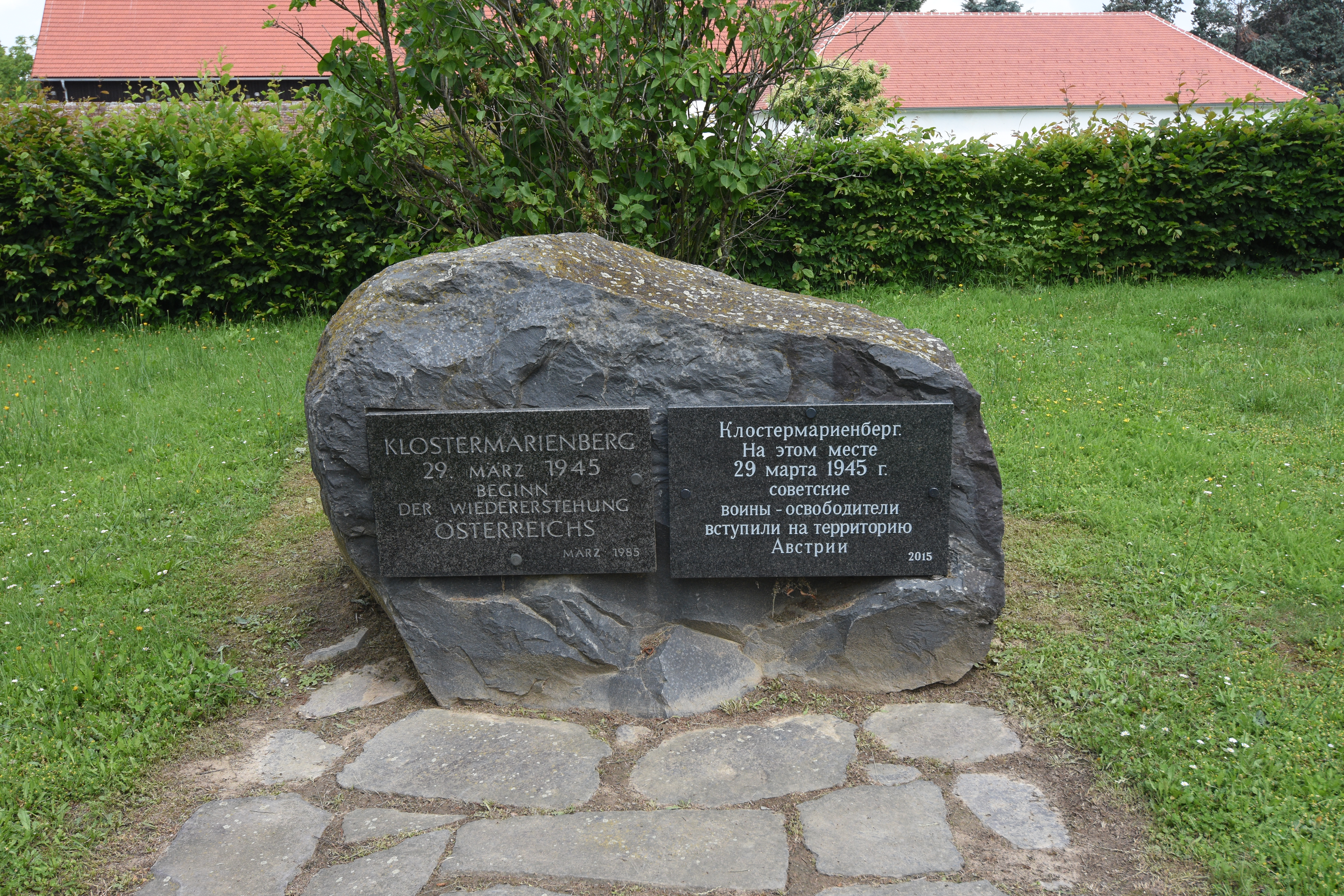
Klostermarienberg Second World War Memorial

== Population ==
Historical population
Year	Pop.	±%
1869	1,819	—
1880	2,967	+63.1%
1890	2,894	−2.5%
1900	1,851	−36.0%
1910	2,951	+59.4%
1923	2,948	−0.1%
1934	2,836	−3.8%
1939	2,617	−7.7%
1951	2,565	−2.0%
1961	2,394	−6.7%
1971	2,281	−4.7%
1981	2,128	−6.7%
1991	2,013	−5.4%
2001	1,939	−3.7%
2011	1,807	−6.8%
