= Szákszend =

Coordinates: 47°33′26″N 18°09′47″E

- Location of Komárom-Esztergom county in Hungary
- Country: Hungary
- County: Komárom-Esztergom

Area
  - Total: 35.93 km^{2} (13.87 sq mi)

Population (2004)
  - Total: 1,526
  - Density: 42.47/km^{2} (110.0/sq mi)
- Time zone: UTC+1 (CET)
  - Summer (DST): UTC+2 (CEST)
- Postal code: 2856
- Area code: 34

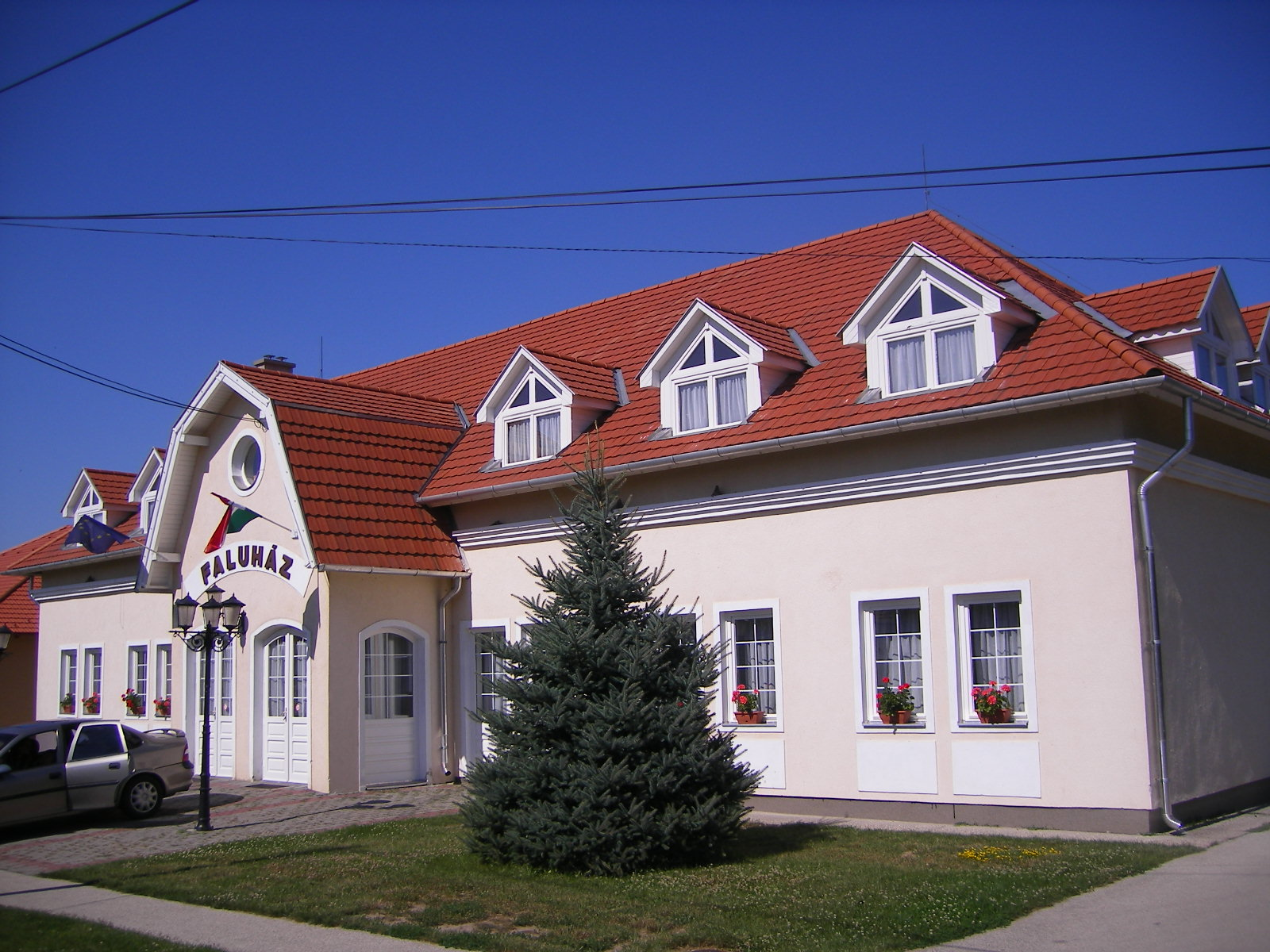
Szákszend

Szákszend is a village in Komárom-Esztergom county, Hungary.
