= Sal Atyusz =

Ispán of Karakó
- Reign: 1205
- Predecessor: first known
- Successor: Thomas Türje (?)
- Died: between 1227 and 1237
- Noble family: gens Atyusz
- Spouse: unknown
- Issue: Eve; Weniwer; Helbrung; Agnes
- Father: unidentified

Sal from the kindred Atyusz (Hungarian: Atyusz nembeli Sal; died between 1227 and 1237) was a Hungarian noble, who served as ispán of Karakó ispánate in 1205.

He was a member of the Atyusz kindred, his cousins were the influential lords Atyusz III, Lawrence (sons of Atyusz II), Miska III and Solomon (sons of Miska II), however Sal's father is unidentified. In 1212, Sal was mentioned as a pristaldus (bailiff) of Andrew II of Hungary.

Sal made his first will and testament in 1221, when bequeathed his estates (e.g. lands and vineyards in Vöröstó, Kál, Tagyon) to the Almád Abbey, a Benedictine monastery founded by his genus, and his daughters. In 1227, he wrote his second testament by inviting his "relative" Stephen, Bishop of Zagreb. He donated further lands in this document. According to a charter issued in 1237, Sal died without male heirs. He had four daughters: Eve (spouse of Buzád III Hahót, the son of Buzád II Hahót), Weniwer, Helbrung and Agnes.

== Sources ==
- Nemes, Gábor (2006). "Az Atyusz nemzetség". In J. Újváry, Zsuzsanna (ed.). Tanulmányok évszázadok történelméből [Essays on Centuries of History] (in Hungarian). Pázmány Péter Catholic University. pp. 13–39. ISBN 963-9206-24-5.
- Zsoldos, Attila (2011). Magyarország világi archontológiája, 1000–1301 [Secular Archontology of Hungary, 1000–1301] (in Hungarian). História, MTA Történettudományi Intézete. ISBN 978-963-9627-38-3.

Sal Genus Atyusz Born: ? Died: between 1227 and 1237
Political offices
Preceded by first known	Ispán of Karakó; 1205	Succeeded by Thomas Türje (?)
