= Negol =

Hungarian clan name

Negol (Nygol) was the name of a minor gens (Latin for "clan"; nemzetség in Hungarian) in the Kingdom of Hungary, which possessed lands in the southern parts of Transdanubia, mainly Baranya County.

== History ==
Their origin is unknown. They possessed lands north of Kisasszonyfa, where they erected a Premonstratensian abbey called Kőrös Monastery (Hungarian: Kőrösmonostora) and later "Insula Lazari". Their nearest neighbor in the region was the Németi clan.

The most prestigious member of the kindred was Batiz, who married Ahalyz, a French noblewoman and lady-in-waiting of Queen Yolanda de Courtenay, the second wife of King Andrew II of Hungary. Batiz served as ispán of Moson County between 1219 and 1221. Following this, he functioned as head of Szolnok County in 1221. He was appointed Judge royal in the very end of 1222. Beside that he also served as ispán of Békés County from 1222 to 1224, his death. Later, his widow married Solomon Atyusz then Bertrand Bajóti. Batiz and Ahalyz also possessed lands in Valkó County. When File Miskolc and his brothers were granted the estates Heyreh and Luder in the county in 1244, Ahalyz and her third husband claimed that the late Batiz donated both estates to her, but Béla IV rejected their statement. Batiz had a son Martin (possibly from his first marriage), who sued a certain Bökény (Büken) regarding the estates Heyreh and Luder in 1240, claiming that Bökény lost these estates of his family, in spite of the guarantee given earlier. As the conclusion of the lawsuit, Endre Németi compensated Martin with 100 marks on behalf of his father-in-law Bökény.

Aside from Batiz and his son, the earliest members of the clan were Lawrence (I) and Bereve, who acted as arbiters during a lawsuit over an estate between Ócsárd and Baksa, commissioned by Palatine Stephen Gutkeled in 1247.

Batiz had a brother (or at least a paternal relative) Nicholas. In 1267, he acted as a royal commissioner when some castle warriors of the fort Kovászd were willing to subjugate themselves to the Dominican nunnery of Rabbits' Island. Nicholas had a daughter Barbara, who married Thomas Győr from his clan's Baranya branch. She was a widow by 1308, when handed over a third portion of Göncöl estate (her dowry) to Peter, son of Ócsa, the husband of her daughter Clara. Barbara inherited the land from her late husband.

Family tree

- N
  - Batiz (fl. 1219–1224) ∞ (1) unknown (2) Ahalyz N
    - (1) Martin (fl. 1240)
  - Nicholas (fl. 1267)
    - Barbara (fl. 1308) ∞ Thomas Győr

=== Kőrös branch ===
During the era of Interregnum, the Kőrösis, the only surviving branch of the Negol clan supported the claim of Charles I of Hungary. The powerful Kőszegi family, which extended their influence over Transdanubia, pillaged their estates in Kőrös in 1316. Three years later, in 1319, John and Thaddeus, the sons of the aforementioned Thomas Győr and Barbara Negol sued their relatives, John and Lawrence (II) – the sons of Lampert Kőrösi –, demanding their mothers' daughters' quarter from them. In 1322, John and his cousin Stephen, son of Demetrius sold their estate Zaláta for 60 marks to Paul Sztárai. Their landholding was adjacent to the local land of the monastery of Kőrös.

Family tree

- N
  - Lampert --> Kőrösi family
    - John (fl. 1319–1322)
    - Lawrence II (fl. 1319)
  - (?) Demetrius
    - Stephen (fl. 1322)

== Sources ==
- F. Romhányi, Beatrix (2000). Kolostorok és társaskáptalanok a középkori Magyarországon: Katalógus [Monasteries and Collegiate Chapters in Medieval Hungary: A Catalogue] (in Hungarian). Pytheas. ISBN 963-7483-07-1.
- Karácsonyi, János (1900). A magyar nemzetségek a XIV. század közepéig. [The Hungarian genera until the middle of the 14th century] (in Hungarian). Hungarian Academy of Sciences.
- Wertner, Mór (1908). "Negol. Batisz országbiró nemzetsége [Negol. The Kindred of Judge royal Batiz]". Turul (in Hungarian). 26 (3): 130–132.
- Zsoldos, Attila (2011). Magyarország világi archontológiája, 1000–1301 [Secular Archontology of Hungary, 1000–1301] (in Hungarian). História, MTA Történettudományi Intézete. ISBN 978-963-9627-38-3.
