= File Miskolc =

Hungarian clergyman

- Provost of Zagreb
- Appointed: 1236
- Term ended: 1247/49
- Predecessor: Matthias Rátót
- Successor: ?

Personal details
- Died: 1247/49

File from the kindred Miskolc (Hungarian: Miskolc nembeli Füle; died between 1247 and 1249) was a Hungarian clergyman in the 13th century, who served as provost of the cathedral chapter of Zagreb from 1236 until his death. He belonged to the entourage of Coloman, Duke of Slavonia. He functioned as chancellor of the ducal court between 1237 and 1241.

== Career ==
File (also Fyle, Phyle or Fila) was born into the Mikola branch of the ancient gens (clan) Miskolc. He had two brothers, comes Thomas and Peter. Their parentage is unknown. Thomas was progenitor of the Vadakoli and Mikolai noble families, which flourished until the 14th and 15th centuries, respectively. Thomas lived in Csáj in Abaúj County in the 1230s (present-day Vyšný Čaj and Nižný Čaj in Slovakia).

File entered the service of Prince Coloman, who was duke of Slavonia from 1226 until his death. File is first mentioned by contemporary records in 1231, when he functioned as notary of Coloman. In this capacity, he formulated the privilege letter of Vukovar. File was elected provost of Zagreb in 1236, replacing Matthias Rátót. He held the position until his death. As provost, File assisted Stephen II, Bishop of Zagreb, an influential confidant of the duke. Beside that, he also served as chancellor for Duke Coloman from 1237 until the latter's death during the first Mongol invasion of Hungary in 1241. Subsequent charters frequently call File as chancellor and "magister", demonstrating the prestige of his office, even though he was not a member of the royal court. According to historian György Györffy, his person ensured the good relationship between Duke Coloman and Bishop Stephen.

Following the death of Coloman, File and his brothers retained the grace of King Béla IV of Hungary, who transcribed and confirmed in their ownership of many landholdings, which they received from Coloman in the last decade. File participated in the royal campaign commanded by Ban Denis Türje in 1244 to the coastal city of Spalato (present-day Split, Croatia), which rebelled against the Hungarian rule. According to contemporary chronicler Thomas the Archdeacon in his work Historia Salonitana, File ("Philetus") led one of the companies which successfully besieged the city. Following the surrender of Spalato, File stood for an immediate peace deal. File acted as a pristaldus (royal commissioner or "bailiff") for the Hungarian monarch in 1245, when registered certain nobles to the ownership of Rakovac. He led a delegation of the cathedral chapter of Zagreb to the royal court in September 1247, requesting Béla IV to donate a portion on the Gradec hill in Zagreb in order to erect a fort to protect the landholdings of the chapter. Subsequently, a tower called Popov toranj was built.

== Estates ==
The Miskolc kindred possessed lands in Borsod County in Northeast Hungary, and File was also a wealthy landowner in the region. A distant relative, Mikó Miskolc pledged his inherited estate of Mályi for 60 marks to File and his brothers in 1234. Later they also owned Kistokaj. File possessed the right of patronage over the Benedictine abbey of Boldva in the first half of the 13th century. File and his brothers also owned portions around Miskolc, the ancient namesake estate of their kindred. Their another distant relative Panyit Miskolc (son of Panyit, from the Keresztúr branch) sold his estate in Miskolc for 30 marks to File and his brothers in 1245. Prior to that, Panyit inherited his estate from his brother Varasd, who died without descendants. File and his brothers sought to acquire the estates of impoverished branches of the Miskolc clan in the region. They bought Dédes from castle warriors in 1247, who originally received the land to build a castle there with royal permission. However, their money ran out. File took over the task of building the castle by purchasing the land. By 1254, a powerful lord and local rival of the Miskolc clan, Ernye Ákos owned the now fully finished Dédes Castle (whether Ernye or File has completed the construction of the fort is uncertain). Simultaneously with his social ascension, File and his family sold their several lands in Borsod County and moved their primary interests to Slavonia.

File's service in the ducal court of Coloman contributed to the acquisition of large estates by him and his brothers in Slavonia, especially Valkó County. In exchange for some landholdings in Hungary, File and Thomas were granted the estates Heyreh and Luder by Coloman in 1237. Béla IV confirmed this donation to them in October 1244, rejecting the claim of Bertrand Bajóti and his wife Ahalyz (widow of Batiz Negol then Solomon Atyusz). File was granted several estates near Pakrac in 1239 – Daróc (present-day Vardarac, Croatia), Ködmen, Rücs and Donát –, which were formerly belonged to the ownership of Abraham Tétény. King Béla donated the estates Mikola and Szentmárton near Svinjarevci and Vukovar to File and his brothers in October 1242, fulfilling the promise of the late Coloman. File also acquired the estate Halmos in the region in early 1244. With these donations, File established a contiguous lordship in the area between the rivers Vuka (Valkó) and Bosut (Báza). File established his seat in Mikola.

== Legacy ==
File died sometime between 1247 and 1249. Béla IV confirmed Thomas and Peter as the owners of "Derinemty", Mikola and Szentmárton for the merits of the late File in January 1249. The monarch did the same regarding the estates Daróc and Ködmen in November 1252.

Following File's death, his brothers gradually sold or exchanged the family estates in Borsod County. Thomas appeared as an appraiser of the Kórógyi family, notable landowners in Valkó County, in 1259. Their exclusion from Northeast Hungary was also accelerated by an unfortunate political decision. The territory belonged to the realm of Duke Stephen, who embroiled into conflict with his father Béla IV. Thomas' son, Nicholas "the Blond" was a retinue of the duke. Around 1263, Stephen handed him 300 silver marks with an order to give it to his distant relative Panyit Miskolc (son of Paul) to finance his legation to the Golden Horde. However, Nicholas embezzled the amount and swore loyalty to King Béla. As a result, following the civil war, Duke Stephen confiscated the estates of the Mikola branch in Borsod County – Mályi, Kistokaj and the portions in Miskolc – and handed them over to Panyit Miskolc in 1268.

Thomas and Nicholas were referred to as owners of Cserics in Valkó County in 1267. Thomas' another son File (II) took part in the Battle on the Marchfeld in 1278. File's son Lawrence participated in the Austrian–Hungarian War of 1291. He was the ancestor of the Vadakoli family. Lawrence and his brothers – Nicholas (II), Peter (II) and Paul – supported Charles I of Hungary during the era of Interregnum in the early 14th century. The Mikolai family descended from Peter (II). All the family estates in Valkó County, which provost File began to expand, were acquired by the powerful Garai family in the first third of the 15th century, following the extinctions of the Vadakoli and Mikolai branches.

== Sources ==
- Draskóczy, István (1996). "Miskolc birtoktörténete a középkorban [The Estate History of Miskolc in the Middle Ages]". In Kubinyi, András (ed.). Miskolc története I. A kezdetektől 1526-ig (in Hungarian). a Borsod-Abaúj-Zemplén Megyei Levéltár – Herman Ottó Múzeum. pp. 81–156. ISBN 963-7241-66-3.
- Font, Márta; Barabás, Gábor (2019). Coloman, King of Galicia and Duke of Slavonia (1208–1241): Medieval Central Europe and Hungarian Power. Amsterdam University Press. ISBN 978-164-1890-24-3.
- Juhász, Csaba (2019). "Zágrábi arengák és narratiók a 13. század első feléből [Harangue and Narrations from the Diocese of Zagreb in the first half of the 13th century]". Magyar Könyvszemle (in Hungarian). 135 (3): 279–306. ISSN 0025-0171.
- Karácsonyi, János (1901). A magyar nemzetségek a XIV. század közepéig. II. kötet [The Hungarian genera until the middle of the 14th century, Vol. 2] (in Hungarian). Hungarian Academy of Sciences.
- Kis, Péter (1995). ""A király hű bárója" (Ákos nembeli Ernye pályafutása) ["The King's Loyal Baron: The Career of Ernye from the Kindred Ákos]". Fons. 2 (3). Szentpétery Imre Történettudományi Alapítvány: 273–316. ISSN 1217-8020.
- Radauš, Tatjana (1998). "Filip". Hrvatski Biografski Leksikon (in Croatian). Miroslav Krleža Lexicographical Institute.
- Zsoldos, Attila (2011). Magyarország világi archontológiája, 1000–1301 [Secular Archontology of Hungary, 1000–1301] (in Hungarian). História, MTA Történettudományi Intézete. ISBN 978-963-9627-38-3.
