= Atyusz (genus) =

Genus (gens) Atyusz
- Country: Kingdom of Hungary
- Founded: c. 1117
- Founder: Bánd I (or Buzad I?)
- Final ruler: Csaba
- Dissolution: c. 1300
- Cadet branches: Almád branch

Atyusz (also Oghuz or Ochuz) was the name of a gens (Latin for "clan"; nemzetség in Hungarian) in the Kingdom of Hungary, several prominent secular dignitaries came from this kindred.

== Etymology ==
The word "Atyusz" is most probably Turkic origin; according to Géza Nagy, that was derived from the name of Oghuz Khagan. Zoltán Gombocz says, the name came from the Turkic otuz word which means "thiry". The kindred's name itself can be rarely found in the contemporary records (only in 1274 and 1296). Beside that the phrase "de genere Almad" ("from the kindred Almád") also appears in charters issued in 1274 and 1276, the late members of the genus, Bánd III and Csaba were styled this. Gábor Nemes argues the descendants had enough to refer Atyusz III, the most influential member in order to distinguish themselves from other noblemen, furthermore Bánd III and Csaba were patrons of the Almád Abbey and emphasized that fact in their charters.

Most likely, the eponymous ancestor of the kindred was Atyusz I, the founder of the monastery in Almád, as Gyula Kristó argues, while formerly János Karácsonyi and József Holub referred to Atyusz III in this case.

== History ==
=== Origins ===
The earliest known member of the family was Bánd I, who died in 1117 according to the establishing charter of the Almád Abbey, but before that, forced to swear his two sons, Atyusz I and Miska I to found the monastery. They also inherited the clan's land estates, including Almád (today Monostorapáti), Vöröstó, Bér, Szigliget and Kövesd (today part of Csopak), each of them in Zala County. The second and surviving wife of Bánd I was a certain Gyönyörű, who was not the mother of the two sons, and who went on a pilgrimage to Jerusalem following his husband's death (Atyusz I referred to her as his "stepmother").

In 1121, Atyusz I founded the Benedictine monastery of Almád Abbey, dedicated to Mary the Virgin and the All Saints, and also donated eight villages. Atyusz died without male heirs thus his younger brother Miska I took over the family name by his descendants.

One of Miska's sons, Stephen wrote his last will and testament in 1174, where he stated he had no children during that time. As a result, he had formerly asked permission from Stephen III of Hungary to freely dispose of his property. Gábor Nemes suggests that Stephen Atyusz might have been identical with a certain Stephen, who served as ispán of Zala County in 1188, however Attila Zsoldos does not share this theory. He granted lands, inter alia, to the Almád Abbey, his wife and especially Atyusz II, also known as "Atyusz the Great", who was a nephew ("nepos") of Stephen and his father's name is unknown. According to Pál Engel, Atyusz II was the brother of Stephen, and not his nephew. In 1221, Béla III of Hungary confiscated Atyusz the Great's land of Kamešnica in Croatia and donated to the Diocese of Zagreb.

=== Heyday ===
Atyusz III was the elder son of Atyusz II; during the first decades of the 13th century, he held several dignities and was also head of numerous counties during the reigns of Emeric and Andrew II. He served as, most notably, Ban of Slavonia (in 1214 and 1220–1222) and Judge royal (1215–1217). In 1221, when Andrew II returned from the Fifth Crusade, Atyusz lent 200 silver marks to the Crown in exchange for returning Kamešnica. In 1232, he was involved in a disagreement and litigation regarding the ownership of some lands against Bartholomew, Bishop of Veszprém, which escalated into the famous Kehida Diploma, an important document for the formation of royal servants' self-government. According to a non-authentic charter dated 1262, his wife was Berbur, a daughter of ispán Sebes Hont-Pázmány.

Atyusz the Great's second son was Lawrence (former genealogical works refer to him incorrectly as the child of Atyusz III), who was appointed Master of the cupbearers by Andrew II in 1217. According to Zsoldos, later he also functioned as Judge royal for a short time in 1222.

Another branch of the clan was originated from Miska II, brother or uncle of Atyusz II the Great. Following the assassination of Queen Gertrude in 1213, he took care of the child Duke Béla until the arrival of the King to Hungary. Andrew II donated Ederics to him in 1214. His son, Miska III was ispán of Vas County in 1214. His another son, Solomon (son of Miska II) was also an influential baron, he served as Master of the treasury from 1214 to 1215. He married Ahalyz, a woman of French origin after 1224.

Sal was a member of the third branch as the grandson of Miska I, however his father's name is unknown. He served as ispán of Karakó ispánate in 1205, he made relatively insignificant career compared to his cousins. He died without male heirs between 1227 and 1237. Ladislaus' branch also remained trivial.

=== Decline ===
The kindred's importance and influence began to decline following the deaths of the members of the fourth generation – Atyusz III, Lawrence, Miska III, Solomon and Sal. According to a royal charter issued by King Béla IV in 1244, Atyusz III's son, Atyusz IV was murdered by a certain Puchuna from Slavonia. The second son of Atyusz III, Györk appeared only at possession sales in contemporary records. He married an unidentified daughter of Michael Hahót, wo was a cousin of Ban Buzád Hahót. Their son Atyusz V was charged disloyalty by Ladislaus IV of Hungary, who confiscated his ownership, the Szentmiklós Castle and donated to Benedict III, Archbishop of Esztergom and his brothers, Dedalus, ispán of Zala County (1273–1274), Beke and Stephen.

Bánd II's sons, Bánd III and Csaba were patrons of the Almád Abbey, according to a royal charter issued in 1274, comes Bánd intended to travel to the Holy Land and donated further lands to Hermann, Abbot of Almád. Csaba belonged to the prestigious landowners in Zala County, but did not hold any specific offices. Their close relative was John (cousin or brother), who was elected Canon of Esztergom. Csaba was last mentioned in 1300, he was the last male member of the kindred and perhaps already died before the extinction of the Árpád dynasty.

== Family tree ==
- Bánd I (d. 1117), married Gyönyörű (2nd marriage)
  - (1st m.) Atyusz I (fl. 1117–1121)
  - (1st m.) Miska I (fl. 1117–1121)
    - Atyusz II ("Atyusz the Great"; fl. 1174–1190), or grandson of Miska I
      - Atyusz III (fl. 1202–1233), Judge royal, married Berbur Hont-Pázmány
        - Atyusz IV, murdered before 1244
        - Györk (fl. 1248–1256), married a daughter of Michael Hahót
          - Atyusz V, died between 1274 and 1276
      - Lawrence (fl. 1217–1224), Judge royal
      - Denis I
        - Bánd II (fl. 1249), Almád branch
          - Bánd III (fl. 1276–1296)
          - Csaba (fl. 1276–1300)
          - John (fl. 1299–1300), canon of Esztergom
        - Denis II ("Finta"; fl. 1249–1276)
        - Miska IV (fl. 1249)
    - Stephen (fl. 1174)
    - Miska II (fl. 1174)
      - Miska III (fl. 1214–1223), ispán of Vas County
      - Solomon (fl. 1214–1227), Judge royal, married Ahalyz (or Elizabeth)
    - unidentified son (fl. 1174)
      - Sal (fl. 1205–1227), ispán of Karakó, died without male heirs
        - Eve (fl. 1221–1227), married Buzád III, son of Buzád II Hahót
        - Weniwer (fl. 1221–1227)
        - Helbrung (fl. 1221–1227)
        - Agnes (fl. 1221–1227)
    - Ladislaus I (fl. 1174)
      - Ladislaus II (fl. 1223), married secondly to Bona, daughter of Wenceslaus
        - Peter
          - Ladislaus III (fl. 1274–1276)

== In historiography ==
The first works about the kindred were written by historians and genealogists Mór Wertner and János Karácsonyi at the turn of the 19th and 20th centuries. In his large-scale work published in 1892 ("Hungarian genera until the middle of the 14th century"), Wertner assumed that Atyusz III, the most prominent member of the family, belonged to the Vázsony kindred and also connected Lodomer, Archbishop of Esztergom to the clan as a member of the so-called "Monoszló branch". According to Gyula Pauler, Atyusz was a descendant of Bulcsú, who settled down near the Lake Balaton in the 10th century.

János Karácsonyi, in his namesake work (1900–1901), first discovered the separate genus of Atyusz and also systematized the family's three branches. Wertner questioned Karácsonyi's remarks in 1902, who also maintained his position. In 1924, palaeographer Emil Jakubovich published the last testament of Stephen, son of Miska I, while Imre Szentpétery founded and translated the deed of the foundation of the Almád Abbey in 1927. After that József Holub wrote his essay in 1937, which was the only publication on this topic until Gábor Nemes' work.

== Sources ==
- Nemes, Gábor (2006). "Az Atyusz nemzetség". In J. Újváry, Zsuzsanna (ed.). Tanulmányok évszázadok történelméből [Essays on Centuries of History] (in Hungarian). Pázmány Péter Catholic University. pp. 13–39. ISBN 963-9206-24-5.
- Zsoldos, Attila (2011). Magyarország világi archontológiája, 1000–1301 [Secular Archontology of Hungary, 1000–1301] (in Hungarian). História, MTA Történettudományi Intézete. ISBN 978-963-9627-38-3.
