= Bertrand Nagymartoni =

Hungarian knight and nobleman

Ispán of Szolgagyőr
- Reign: 1243
- Predecessor: Peter (1239)
- Successor: Ernye Ákos (1250)
- Died: after 1276
- Noble family: House of Nagymartoni
- Spouses: 1, Ahalyz (or Elizabeth); 2, unidentified
- Issue: a daughter

Bertrand Nagymartoni (also Bajóti or Martinsdorfi, Hungarian: Nagymartoni Bertrand; died after 1276) was an Aragonese-born Hungarian knight and nobleman in the 13th century. He and his siblings settled down in Hungary, where the family integrated into the social elite.

== Arrival to Hungary ==
Bertrand (or Bertram) was born into an Aragonese noble family. He had a sister Tota and a brother Simon (I). As Bertrand was still alive in 1276, he was probably much younger than his siblings. The circumstances of their arrival to Hungary are narrated by two near-contemporary chroniclers, Ákos and Simon of Kéza, albeit with some differences. According to Ákos (his text is preserved by the 14th-century Illuminated Chronicle), Simon and Bertrand settled in Hungary during the reign of Andrew II, after their unidentified father "fought for many years against the king of Aragon, until at last he was captured by the king and put in prison". In contrast, Simon of Kéza narrates that the brothers arrived to Hungary under Emeric's rule, as members of the accompaniment of Queen Constance of Aragon. The author of the Gesta Hunnorum et Hungarorum says that the "kindred had long been at odds with a particular great count, and that finally they gathered an army and took to the field against him. The count was taken prisoner and strangled on the orders of Simon [...], and Bertram [...]. The ensuing enmity was what first brought Simon and Bertram to Pannonia [Hungary] with the aforesaid queen [Constance]". Both chronicles mention the family's castles in the Iberian Peninsula ("Boiot"), their clashes against the "sultan of Tunis" (plausibly Abu Zakariya Yahya) in Mallorca and Menorca and the coat-of-arms donation of eagle derived therefrom. In addition, Simon of Kéza does not omit to mention Tota, who was lady-in-waiting of Queen Constance and married a powerful lord Benedict, son of Korlát and was granted the estates Nagymarton (or Mattersdorf, present-day Mattersburg, Austria) and Bajót as her dowry in 1202.

While Tota was in fact belonged to the entourage of Queen Constance, historian Antal Pór ruled out that Simon and Bertrand had also came to Hungary during the reign of King Emeric. While Simon first appears in contemporary Hungarian records in 1220, Bertrand is first mentioned only decades later. For instance, when Simon inherited Nagymarton and Bajót from her sister in the 1220s, there is no sign of Bertrand's presence. Both Simon and Bertrand arrived to Hungary during the reign of Andrew II, but the latter settled in Hungary even later, following his elder brother. Historian Attila Zsoldos considered if anyone from the family, only Bertrand participated in the conquest of Majorca (1228–1231), but he settled down in Hungary too before 1241. Bertrand mediated the prenuptial agreement between James I of Aragon and Violant of Hungary in February 1233, alongside Pope Gregory IX and Bartholomew le Gros, the Bishop of Pécs.

== Career in Hungary ==
When the Mongols invaded Hungary in the spring of 1241, both Simon and Bertrand participated in the disastrous Battle of Mohi on 11 April 1241. Whether Bertrand followed his brother into the citadel of Esztergom thereafter, is unknown. Following the siege of Esztergom, Simon and Bertrand have completed diplomatic missions several times throughout the year 1242 on behalf of Béla IV in order to seek military assistance and financial aid against the Mongols. The brothers were granted several lands from the king – Béla detached the estate Gadundorf from Moson Castle in Moson County, Zolonta from Pozsony Castle (present-day a borough of Okoč, Slovakia), Pucyn from Sopron Castle, Kesző in Vágköz (the area between Danube and Vág [Váh]) from Komárom Castle and handed over these estates to Simon and Bertrand. Béla also entrusted the brothers to populate, cultivate and develop these lands, whose population has fled or died during the Mongol invasion. In addition to landholdings, Bertrand was made ispán of Szolgagyőr (Galgóc) royal castle (ispánate) within Nyitra County in 1243 (present-day ruins in Hlohovec, Slovakia).

Bertrand integrated into the Hungarian elite together with his family (later known as Nagymartonis or Bajótis). Sometime after 1233, he married a French noblewoman Ahalyz (or Elizabeth), who was a former lady-in-waiting for Queen Yolanda, the second spouse of King Andrew II. Bertrand became her third husband; formerly she was a widow of Hungarian lords Batiz Negol then Solomon Atyusz. She possessed lands in Valkó County. When File Miskolc and his brothers were granted the estates Heyreh and Luder in the county by Duke Coloman, Béla IV confirmed this donation to them in October 1244, rejecting the claim of Bertrand and Ahalyz. Their marriage produced an unidentified daughter, who married Osl (III) from the gens (clan) Osl. They were progenitors of the Ostfi (Ostffy) de Asszonyfalva noble family. After Ahalyz's death, Bertrand married for a second time. His widow was still alive in 1302.

Bertrand participated in the Battle of the Leitha River on 15 June 1246, where he was captured and imprisoned. He was released after a while. For his captivity, Béla IV donated three villages called Család – present-day Csapod, Hövej and Pusztacsalád – in Sopron County, which had previously belonged to the accessories of Szolgagyőr Castle. Béla also handed over the lands on the outskirts of settlements along the river Rábca. The Hungarian monarch confirmed these donations in 1257. Bertrand bought Pugina in Sopron County for 16 marks from local castle warriors around 1265. After the wedding of Osl and his daughter, Bertrand bequeathed his two villages called Család – Csapod and Pusztacsalád – to his son-in-law in 1276.

== Sources ==
=== Primary sources ===
- Simon of Kéza: The Deeds of the Hungarians (Edited and translated by László Veszprémy and Frank Schaer with a study by Jenő Szűcs) (1999). CEU Press. ISBN 963-9116-31-9.
- Bak, János M.; Veszprémy, László; Kersken, Norbert (2018). Chronica de gestis Hungarorum e codice picto saec. XIV [The Illuminated Chronicle: Chronicle of the deeds of the Hungarians from the fourteenth-century illuminated codex]. Budapest: Central European University Press. ISBN 978-9-6338-6264-3.

=== Secondary sources ===
- Csifó, Tamás (2019). "A Magyar Királyság kapcsolatai Hispániával a 12. század végén és a 13. század első felében [The connections of the Kingdom of Hungary with Hispania at the end of the 12th and in the first half of the 13th century]". Móra Akadémia (in Hungarian). 7. SZTE Móra Ferenc Kollégium: 152–174. ISSN 2064-809X.
- Pór, Antal (1889). "A Nagy-Martoniak [The Nagymartonis]". Turul (in Hungarian). 7 (2): 57–70. ISSN 1216-7258.
- Zsoldos, Attila (2009). "A Nagymartoniak: egy aragóniai család Magyarországon [The Nagymartonis: an Aragonese Family in Hungary]". In Tóth, Csaba; Sarobe, Ramon (eds.). Királylányok messzi földről. Magyarország és Katalónia a középkorban (in Hungarian). Hungarian National Museum. pp. 177–189. ISBN 978-963-706-164-6.
- Zsoldos, Attila (2011). Magyarország világi archontológiája, 1000–1301 [Secular Archontology of Hungary, 1000–1301] (in Hungarian). História, MTA Történettudományi Intézete. ISBN 978-963-9627-38-3.
