= Šopron =

Šopron may refer to:

- Sopron, a city in Hungary
- Šopron, Croatia, a village near Kalnik, Koprivnica-Križevci County, Croatia
