= David Scheffel =

Canadian former professor

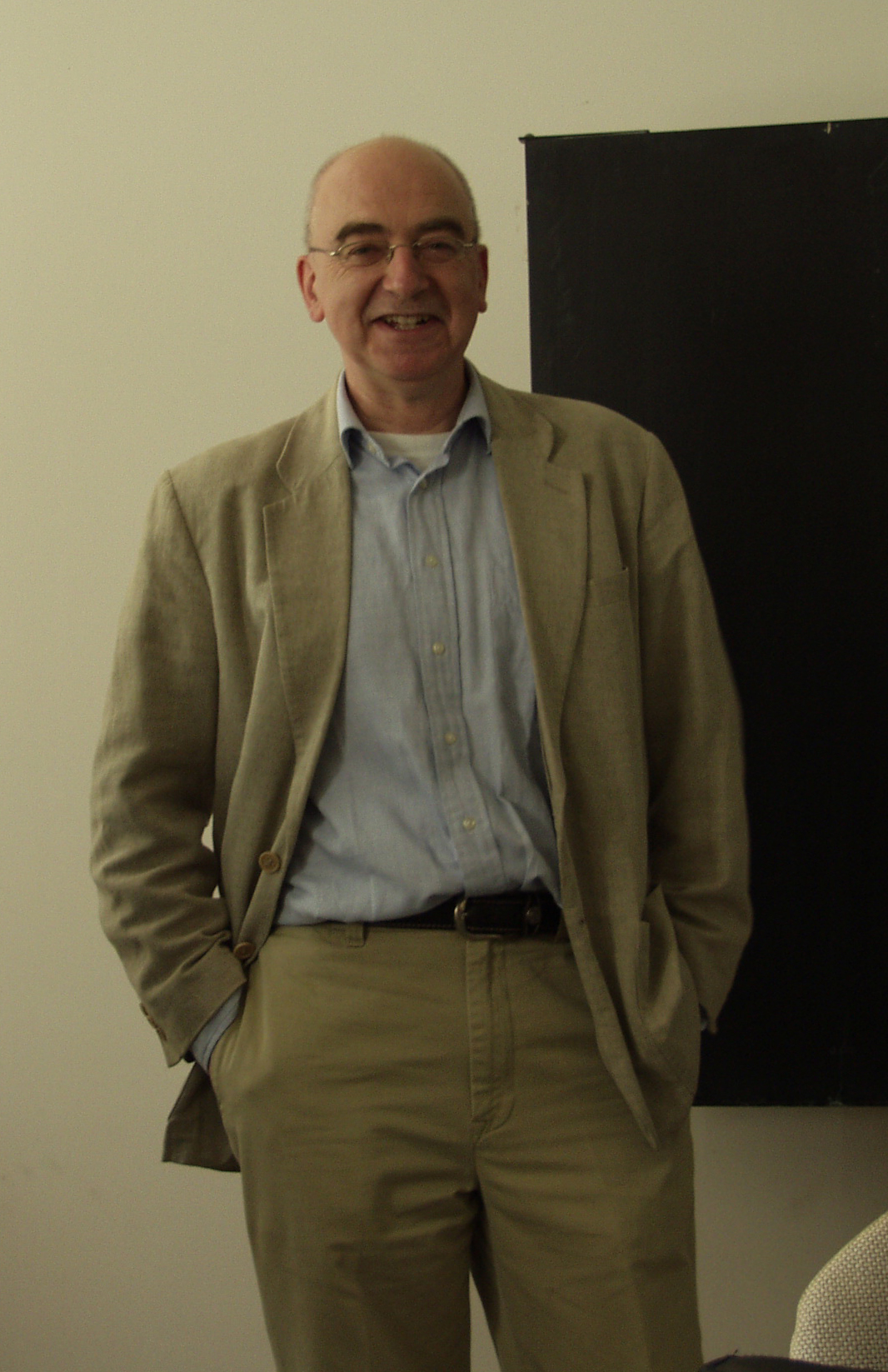
Scheffel in Czechia in 2008

David Z. Scheffel is a Canadian and Dutch former professor of anthropology at Thompson Rivers University in Kamloops, British Columbia, Canada.

== Biography ==
Scheffel was born in Prague, Czechoslovakia in 1954 or 1955. He emigrated as a teenager in 1968. He is a permanent resident of Canada and a citizen of the Netherlands.

He authored a 2005 study titled Svinia in Black & White: Slovak Roma and Their Neighbours detailing a field study in the Slovakian village of Svinia. He implemented a development project aimed at improving the conditions of the local impoverished Roma community. As part of the project, he aimed to develop apartments for the local Roma. He cooperated with the municipal government and acquired eight hectares of land with an EU grant, but the project ended when a new mayor rejected it and ended cooperation. This project is also the subject of a 1998 documentary film titled The Gypsies of Svinia.

Scheffel studied child prostitution in Roma settlements in eastern Slovakia, and in 2017 a report was filed against him for reportedly sexually abusing the children that he studied. In June 2019, a Slovakian court in Prešov found Scheffel guilty of sexual abuse, child pornography possession, and illegal weapon possession. He was sentenced to seven years in prison.

Scheffel's lawyer claimed that the charges were likely fabricated in order to undermine Scheffel's advocacy for the Roma community. The lawyer was reportedly not allowed to cross-examine any of the witnesses that testified against Scheffel. The Association for Slavic, East European, and Eurasian Studies and the Canadian Anthropology Society both expressed concern about the circumstances of Scheffel's arrest and trial. In 2021, the Canadian Association of University Teachers wrote a letter to Canadian Foreign Affairs Minister Marc Garneau, petitioning him to intervene in what they described as his "unjust detention". Scheffel reportedly contracted COVID-19 while in prison.

== Books ==
- Scheffel, David Z. (2005-04-01). Svinia in Black and White: Slovak Roma and their Neighbours. University of Toronto Press. ISBN 978-1-4426-0683-8.
- "Roma Marginality/Romska Marginalita". Assessment of Marginality and Integration Among Disadvantaged Groups conference held at the Faculty of Philosophy. Prešov University. September 25–27, 2003.
- Scheffel, David (1991). In the Shadow of Antichrist: The Old Believers of Alberta. Peterborough, Ont.: Broadview Press. ISBN 978-0-921149-73-6.
