= Batiz Negol =

Hungarian noble

Judge royal
- Reign: 1222–1224
- Predecessor: Solomon Atyusz
- Successor: Ladislaus Kán
- Died: 1224
- Noble family: gens Negol
- Spouses: 1, unknown 2, Ahalyz (or Elizabeth)
- Issue: (1) Martin

Batiz from the kindred Negol (Hungarian: Negol nembeli Batiz; fl. 1219 – died 1224) was a Hungarian noble, who served as Judge royal from 1222 until his death, during the reign of Andrew II of Hungary.

He was born into the gens (clan) Negol (or Nygol), which originated from Baranya County, he had a younger brother, Nicholas. Batiz (or Botez) married Ahalyz (also Elizabeth) of French origin, who was a maid of honor for Queen Yolanda, the second spouse of King Andrew II. Batiz and Ahalyz had no children, and following Batiz's death in 1224, the French noblewoman married to Solomon Atyusz (his predecessor as Judge royal), and later Bertrand Bajóti, when she was widowed for a second time.

Batiz was first mentioned as ispán of Moson County between 1219 and 1221. Following this, he functioned as head of Szolnok County in 1221. He was appointed Judge royal in the very end of 1222, replacing Solomon Atyusz. Beside that he also served as ispán of Békés County from 1222 to 1224. In 1223, Batiz was rebuked by Pope Honorius III, because he had formerly financially damaged Gottfried, the Provost of Arad. He died in 1224.

Batiz had a son Martin from his previous marriage to an unidentified noblewoman. He sued a certain Bökény (Büken) regarding the estates Heyreh and Luder in 1240, claiming that Bökény lost these estates of his family, in spite of the guarantee given earlier. As the conclusion of the lawsuit, Endre Németi compensated Martin with 100 marks on behalf of his father-in-law Bökény. Batiz and Ahalyz also possessed lands in Valkó County. When File Miskolc and his brothers were granted the aforementioned estates Heyreh and Luder in the county in 1244, Ahalyz and her third husband Bertrand claimed that the late Batiz donated both estates to her, but Béla IV rejected their statement.

== Sources ==
- Markó, László (2006). A magyar állam főméltóságai Szent Istvántól napjainkig: Életrajzi Lexikon [Great Officers of State in Hungary from King Saint Stephen to Our Days: A Biographical Encyclopedia] (in Hungarian). Helikon Kiadó. ISBN 963-208-970-7.
- Nemes, Gábor (2006). "Az Atyusz nemzetség". In J. Újváry, Zsuzsanna (ed.). Tanulmányok évszázadok történelméből [Essays on Centuries of History] (in Hungarian). Pázmány Péter Catholic University. pp. 13–39. ISBN 963-9206-24-5.
- Wertner, Mór (1908). "Negol. Batisz országbiró nemzetsége [Negol. The Kindred of Judge royal Batiz]". Turul (in Hungarian). 26 (3): 130–132.
- Zsoldos, Attila (2011). Magyarország világi archontológiája, 1000–1301 [Secular Archontology of Hungary, 1000–1301] (in Hungarian). História, MTA Történettudományi Intézete. ISBN 978-963-9627-38-3.

Batiz Genus Negol Born: ? Died: 1224
Political offices
Preceded by Solomon Atyusz	Judge royal 1222–1224	Succeeded by Ladislaus Kán
