= Atyusz III Atyusz =

Hungarian baron

Atyusz (III) Atyusz

Judge royal
- Reign: 1215–1217 (or 1218)
- Predecessor: Martin Hont-Pázmány
- Successor: Julius Rátót
- Died: after 1233
- Noble family: gens Atyusz
- Spouse: Berbur Hont-Pázmány
- Issue: Atyusz IV; Györk
- Father: Atyusz II

Atyusz III from the kindred Atyusz (also Oguz; Hungarian: Atyusz nembeli (III.) Atyusz; died after 1233) was a Hungarian influential baron, the most outstanding member of his family, who served as Judge royal from 1215 to 1217, during the reign of Andrew II of Hungary.

== Family ==
He was born into the Atyusz kindred as the eldest son of Atyusz II (also known as Atyusz the Great), who inherited the majority of the family property from his brother (or uncle), the childless Stephen, according to the latter's will and testament. He had at least one younger brother, Lawrence, who also functioned as Judge royal for a short time in 1222 (former genealogical works incorrectly referred to Lawrence as the child of Atyusz III). Perhaps Denis I was also a brother of Atyusz III and Lawrence. As a result of the extended clan, Atyusz III had several notable cousins, including Solomon (also Judge royal in 1222 and a close ally to Atyusz) and ispáns Miska III and Sal. 19th-century historian Mór Wertner mistakenly referred to Atyusz as a member of the Vázsony kindred.

According to a non-authentic charter from the 1320s, which falsely dated 22 March 1262, Atyusz III's wife was lady Berbur from the Hont-Pázmány kindred as the daughter of Sebes Hont-Pázmány, the Master of the cupbearers between 1209 and 1217. As the charter says, comes Abraham, son of Sebes, sold Zánka to his sister, which he had formerly inherited from Atyusz III, his brother-in-law. Although the document is definitely a forgery, nevertheless historian Gábor Nemes accepts the information can be found on Atyusz's marriage, as the objective of the diploma's falsification is not affected from this side. The non-authentic charter was part of a trial court between the Amadé and Szentgyörgyi families for the ownership of Várkony (today part of Vrakúň, Slovakia).

Atyusz III and Berbur had two children. The elder one Atyusz IV was mentioned as a living person only once in 1236 on the occasion of a possession sale. According to a royal charter issued by Béla IV of Hungary in 1244, Atyusz IV was murdered by a certain Puchuna from Slavonia, who "had committed numerous murders and other crimes". As Béla IV writes, the whole kingdom mourned Atyusz IV's death.

They also had a younger son named Györk (or Gyurkó). He was first mentioned in 1248, when owned Sevnica (today in Slovenia). In 1251 he sold Pécsely to the Chapter of Veszprém, and also swore protection to the diocese. He married an unidentified daughter of Michael Hahót (cousin of Ban and Christian martyr Buzád Hahót). They had a son, Atyusz V, who owned Dabrony in 1274. Two years later, Atyusz V was charged disloyalty by Ladislaus IV of Hungary, who confiscated his ownership, the Szentmiklós Castle and donated to Benedict III, Archbishop of Esztergom and his brothers, Dedalus, ispán of Zala County (1273–1274), Beke and Stephen. Atyusz V died without lands and heirs, thus Atyusz III's branch became extinct with him in 1276.

== Career ==
Atyusz first appeared in contemporary records in 1202, as head of Fejér County until 1203, during the last years of King Emeric. As he was loyal to Duke Andrew, he lost his political influence after 1203, when Emeric's brother rose up in open rebellion against the King at umpteenth time in the autumn of 1203. He regained his influence at the royal court only after the unexpected death of the child Ladislaus III in 1205. Andrew II, who had ascended the throne appointed him ispán of Zala County and held the position until 1206. According to a charter, he governed Pozsony County, one of the most important territorial units, in 1207. In the same year, he also served as ispán of Veszprém and Vas Counties. From 1209 to 1212, he held the office of ispán of Sopron County.

In 1214, he was made Ban of Slavonia and head of Somogy County. As László Markó suggests, Atyusz already held the ispánate since 1209, however this rumor is not supported by Attila Zsoldos' work. Only one charter preserved his first term as Ban, when Atyusz sent his pristaldus Lawrence Ajkai on the occasion of a legal transaction. In 1215, Andrew II nominated him as Judge royal, the second-highest secular position in Hungary. He was also head of Bács County in that year. He served as Judge royal until 1217, nevertheless, according to a non-authentic record, he held the dignity even in 1218. In 1216, he purchased the estate of Tomaj from Palatine Pat Győr, who had received the land as compensation from King Andrew, who confiscated it from Tiba Tomaj, who had murdered Palatine Csépán Győr, Pat's brother, before. Shall soon, Atyusz sold the estate.

Atyusz, alongside his brother Lawrence, participated in Andrew's Fifth Crusade between 1217 and 1218. Returning home, Atyusz lent 200 silver marks to the Crown in exchange for returning Kamešnica, which was previously confiscated by Béla III of Hungary from the kindred. Thus Andrew II was able to pay the royal court's huge debts, caused by the Fifth Crusade, on which Pope Innocent III forced him to organize. In 1219 (or earlier) Atyusz was appointed Judge royal for Queen Yolanda. He held that dignity until 1221. Beside that he was also ispán of Bodrog (1219) and Varaždin Counties (1220). He served as Ban of Slavonia for the second time, replacing his cousin Solomon Atyusz. The name of the dignity appeared once as "Ban of Dalmatia and Croatia" (Latin: banus Dalmatie et Chroatie) in 1221. Atyusz released the earliest known charter issued by a Ban (preserved in Zadar), when judged over the Saints Cosmas and Damian monastery of Biograd na Moru (Hungarian: Tengerfehérvár) and the Knights Templar during a trial court. Following the Golden Bull of 1222, he disappeared from the sources for years. From 1226, he again served as Judge royal in the queen's court. Beside that he was elected head of Bodrog County in 1228. He functioned as Judge royal for the Queen until 1229, when he was replaced by Peter Tétény.

Atyusz III became embroiled in a conflict with Bartholomew, Bishop of Veszprém in 1232, which proved to be the first milestone towards the noble self-determination. According to Bartholomew's accusation, Atyusz III had "unjustly and violently seized and retained the diocesan land of Wezmech, and he refused to give back". In contrast, Atyusz argued the land belonged to the Atyusz kindred's ancient property. Local nobles from Zala County, called royal servants, cited the lord and his potential witnesses in front of their own tribunal at three times, but Atyusz did not deign to answer them. Thus the nobles judged in favour of Bartholomew. The royal servants issued the so-called Kehida Diploma to call King Andrew II to recognise their verdict as compulsory, because Atyusz refused to give back the land to the Diocese of Veszprém and prevented by force pristaldus Andronicus Apáti to execute the judgment. Later, the royal servants were able to enforce the verdict as Bartholomew sold Wezmech to Michael Hahót in 1239. The Kehida Diploma was the first sign of the formation of "noble counties". From the 1230s, the terminology used in the royal charters when they referred to "royal servants" began to change and they were more and more frequently mentioned as "noble servants" (Latin: nobiles sevientes) and later, as "nobles or servants" (Latin: nobiles seu sevientes), while finally, the Decree of 1267 issued by King Béla IV identified the "royal servants" with the nobles.

== Sources ==
- Markó, László (2006). A magyar állam főméltóságai Szent Istvántól napjainkig: Életrajzi Lexikon [Great Officers of State in Hungary from King Saint Stephen to Our Days: A Biographical Encyclopedia] (in Hungarian). Helikon Kiadó. ISBN 963-208-970-7.
- Nemes, Gábor (2006). "Az Atyusz nemzetség". In J. Újváry, Zsuzsanna (ed.). Tanulmányok évszázadok történelméből [Essays on Centuries of History] (in Hungarian). Pázmány Péter Catholic University. pp. 13–39. ISBN 963-9206-24-5.
- Zsoldos, Attila (1997). "»Eléggé nemes férfiak...« A kehidai oklevél társadalomtörténeti vonatkozásairól". In Káli, Csaba (ed.). Zalai történeti tanulmányok [Essays on History of Zala] (in Hungarian). Zala County Archives. pp. 7–19. ISBN 963-7226-26-5.
- Zsoldos, Attila (2011). Magyarország világi archontológiája, 1000–1301 [Secular Archontology of Hungary, 1000–1301] (in Hungarian). História, MTA Történettudományi Intézete. ISBN 978-963-9627-38-3.

Atyusz III Genus Atyusz Born: ? Died: after 1233
Political offices
Preceded by Julius Kán	Ban of Slavonia; 1214	Succeeded by Ivan Bikács
Preceded by Martin Hont-Pázmány	Judge royal 1215–1217/8	Succeeded by Julius Rátót
Preceded by Solomon Atyusz	Ban of Slavonia; 1220–1222	Succeeded by Solomon Atyusz
