= Miska III Atyusz =

Hungarian noble (reigned 1214)

Miska (III) Atyusz

Ispán of Vas
- Reign: 1214
- Predecessor: Julius Kán
- Successor: Martin Ják
- Noble family: gens Atyusz
- Spouse: unknown
- Issue: none
- Father: Miska II

Miska (III) from the kindred Atyusz (Hungarian: Atyusz nembeli (III.) Miska) was a Hungarian noble, who served as ispán of Vas County in 1214.

He was a member of the Atyusz kindred as the son of Miska II, his brother was Judge royal Solomon. He had also several cousins, including the influential lords Atyusz III, Lawrence (sons of Atyusz II) and Sal.

== Sources ==
- Nemes, Gábor (2006). "Az Atyusz nemzetség". In J. Újváry, Zsuzsanna (ed.). Tanulmányok évszázadok történelméből [Essays on Centuries of History] (in Hungarian). Pázmány Péter Catholic University. pp. 13–39. ISBN 963-9206-24-5.
- Zsoldos, Attila (2011). Magyarország világi archontológiája, 1000–1301 [Secular Archontology of Hungary, 1000–1301] (in Hungarian). História, MTA Történettudományi Intézete. ISBN 978-963-9627-38-3.

Miska III Genus Atyusz Born: ? Died: ?
Political offices
Preceded by Julius Kán	Ispán of Vas; 1214	Succeeded by Martin Ják
