= Svinia =

- Municipality
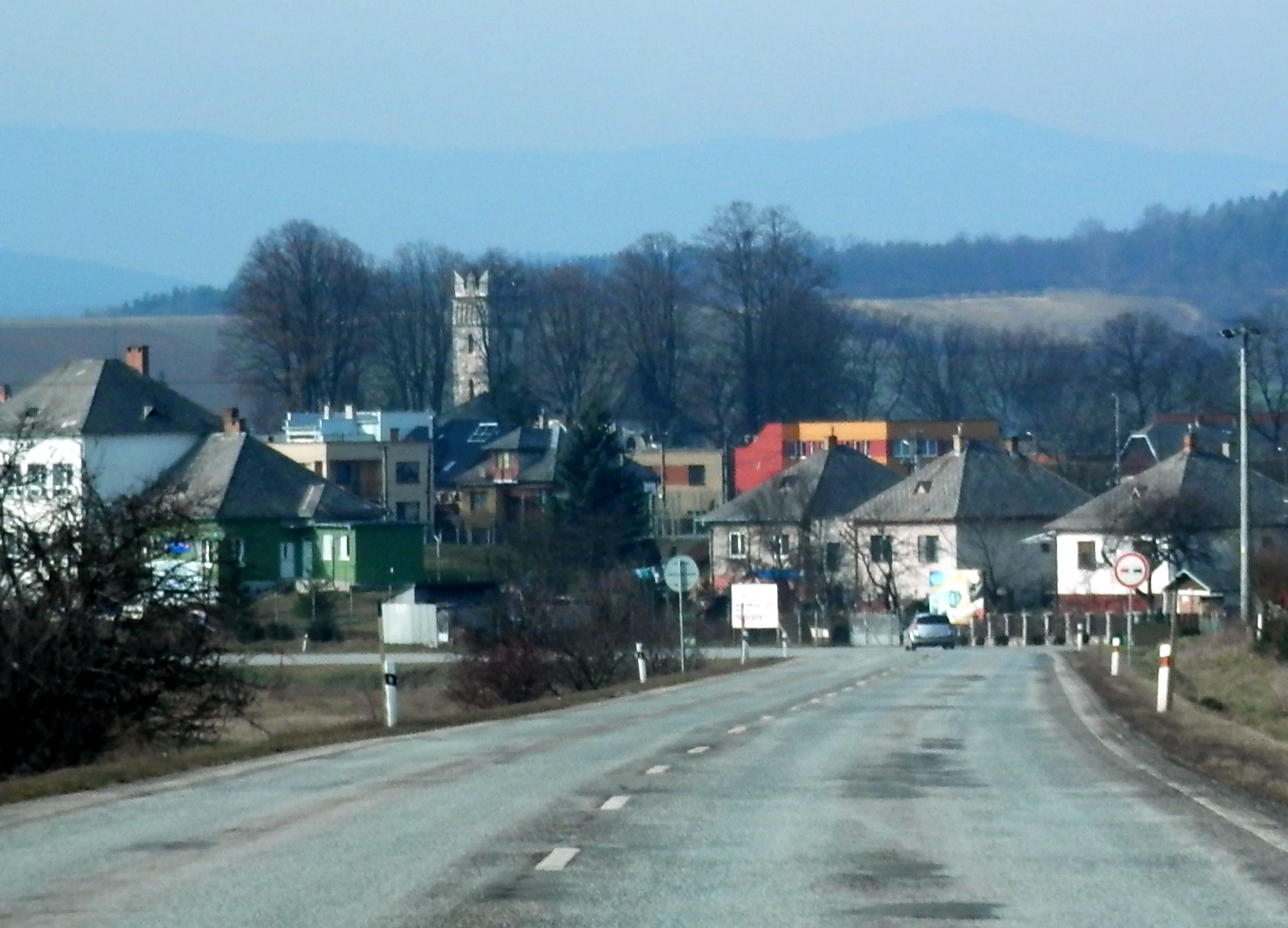

- Flag

- Location of Svinia in the Prešov Region Location of Svinia in Slovakia
- Coordinates: 49.02°N 21.13°E
- Country: Slovakia
- Region: Prešov Region
- District: Prešov District
- First mentioned: 1249

Government
  - Mayor: Miroslav Nawrat (Independent)

Area
  - Total: 14.73 km^{2} (5.69 sq mi)
- Elevation: 361 m (1,184 ft)

Population (2025)
  - Total: 2,767
- Time zone: UTC+1 (CET)
  - Summer (DST): UTC+2 (CEST)
- Postal code: 823 2
- Area code: +421 51
- Vehicle registration plate (until 2022): PO

Svinia (Hungarian: Szinye) is a village of some 1,500 people (as of 2005) in eastern Slovakia about 8 kilometres (5.0 mi) west from Prešov. The village covers an area of 14.734 square kilometres (5.689 sq mi). Svinia is located in the Šariš Highlands in the valley of Veľká and Mala Svinka. The village is one of the oldest villages in the former Šariš County. The village belonged to the Hungarian Merše family from Budapest from 1262 to 1918. Until 1262, the settlement of Svinia belonged to Bár-Kalán ban of Slavonia.

== Geography ==
The municipality lies at an altitude of 361 metres (1,184 ft) and covers an area of 14.73 km^{2} (5.69 sq mi) (2025).

== History ==
The first owner of the Svinia settlement was around 1210 the Slavonian ban Bánk Bár-Kalán of the clan Bár-Kalán. He was a ban of Slavonia in the first decades of the 13th century. He owned land in the catchment area of today's Veľká and Mala Svinka. He was in the service of King Andrew II. When Bánk Bár-Kalán died, his entire property, including the settlement of Svinia, belonged to the new Hungarian king Béla IV. This proves that the village existed at the beginning of the 13th century, although the first written mention dates back to 1262. This first written mention of the village is from 1262, when it is mentioned as posessio Sanefalva, the estate of Sanefalva. This year, the Hungarian monarch, Béla IV gave large areas of land that previously belonged to the ban to general Merse as a reward for military successes against the Bulgarians. This gift included the area covering the valleys of the Veľká and Mala Svinka streams, the settlements of Svinia (Sanefalva), Chminianska Nová Ves (Vyfolu) and Jarovnice (Jarne), which lay near the Šariš Castle. This donation was also confirmed by the following rulers Stephen V and Ladislaus IV.

There are two theories according to which the name of the village may have originated.

- The first theory is that Svinia got its name from the river. The original Slovak name of today's Veľká and Mala Svinka was Svinná. The Hungarians took this name and made it the name Szinyei.
- The second theory is that the name may also come from the word "pig". If we admit that the name captured the fact that the local servants kept pigs on behalf of the king, then the origin of the settlement would date back to the 11th and 12th centuries. However, the name does not have the characteristics of servants' villages. It follows that the village existed before the 11th century.

== Cultural monuments ==
Many culturally significant monuments have remained here in the past. These include a church, a church tower, an old rectory and two manor houses.

The gothic Roman Catholic church is dedicated to the Nativity of the Virgin Mary. The first written mention of the church is from 1274. After several reconstructions, the church still stands today. Below this church are the tombs of the owners of the Svinia estate. In the 17th century, a Renaissance tower was added to the church. The bodies of some of the victims of the Prešov slaughterhouse lay beneath it.

The first manor house is a single-storey building with flat ceilings. Today it houses a special primary school.

The second manor house dates from the second half of the 18th century. The rooms in this mansion are vaulted with Prussian vaults.

An important event for the village of Svinia is the secret burial of the burghers of Prešov, who were executed by General Antonio di Caraff (1646–1693) in 1687.

== Population ==
Population statistic (10 years)
Year	1995	2005	2015	2025
Count	1195	1506	2149	2767
Difference		+26.02%	+42.69%	+28.75%

Population statistic
Year	2024	2025
Count	2673	2767
Difference		+3.51%

It has a population of 2767 people (31 December 2025).

=== Ethnicity ===
Census 2021 (1+ %)
Ethnicity	Number	Fraction
Slovak	1736	72.81%
Romani	1324	55.53%
Not found out	273	11.45%
Total	2384	

In year 2021 was 2384 people by ethnicity 1736 as Slovak, 1324 as Romani, 273 as Not found out, 12 as Rusyn, 8 as Czech, 1 as Hungarian and 1 as Other.

Note on population: The difference values of population numbers in the table "Population statistic" and in the sections "Ethnicity" & "Religion" is caused by the use of various statistical methods.

=== Religion ===
Census 2021 (1+ %)
Religion	Number	Fraction
Roman Catholic Church	2036	85.4%
Not found out	201	8.43%
None	96	4.03%
Greek Catholic Church	26	1.09%
Total	2384	

In year 2021 was 2384 people by religion 2036 from Roman Catholic Church, 201 from Not found out, 96 from None, 26 from Greek Catholic Church, 6 from Eastern Orthodox Church, 6 from Evangelical Church, 5 from Church of the Brethren, 4 from Christian Congregations in Slovakia, 1 from Jewish community, 1 from Jehovah's Witnesses, 1 from Buddhism and 1 from Ad hoc movements.

Svinia consists of two settlements of similar size, one inhabited by Slovaks and the other by Romani. The Svinia Romani settlement was visited and "discovered" by Canadian anthropologists in 1993, and became the subject of the documentary film The Gypsies of Svinia. The team was shocked at the appalling and unsanitary living conditions, the 100% unemployment rate, and the divisions between white Svinia and Romani Svinia. Svinia has since become infamous in Europe and has been the subject of studies, books and films. International projects to improve life for the Romani in Svinia have been ongoing since the 1990s. In 2019, Roma constituted an estimated 65% of the population of the municipality.

== See also ==
- Roma in Slovakia
