= Stephen II (bishop of Zagreb) =

Croatian–Hungarian prelate

Stephen
- Bishop of Zagreb
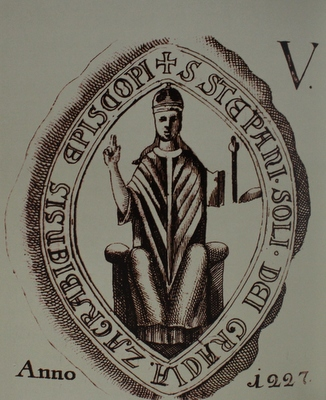
- Seal of Stephen (1227)
- Appointed: 1225
- Term ended: 10 July 1247
- Predecessor: Stephen I
- Successor: Philip Türje
- Other posts: Provost of Arad; Chancellor

Orders
- Rank: Subdeacon

Personal details
- Born: 1190s
- Died: 10 July 1247 Čazma, Croatia in personal union with Hungary
- Buried: Church of St. Mary Magdalene, Čazma

Stephen II (Croatian: Stjepan, Hungarian: István; 1190/95 – 10 July 1247) was a Croatian–Hungarian prelate of the Catholic Church who served as Bishop of Zagreb from 1225 until his death in 1247.

== Theories of origin ==
Stephen II was born between 1190 and 1195. Croatian historian Ivan Kukuljević Sakcinski thought that Stephen originated from the Babonić noble family, which argument was also accepted by a majority of scholars in Croatia, including Neven Budak and Lejla Dobronić. In contrast, Baltazar Adam Krčelić regarded him as a relative of Prince Coloman and kings Andrew II and Béla IV. Both Krčelić and Pavao Ritter Vitezović considered Stephen belonged to the Hungarian clan Hahót (or Buzád). Hungarian historian Judit Gál shared this argument, while Gábor Barabási mentioned Stephen's "possible Hungarian origin". In his last will and testament from 1227, Hungarian ispán Sal Atyusz referred to Stephen as his "relative" (Latin: consanguineus), which assumes that Stephen originated from the Atyusz clan, but he may have been related to the genus only on a maternal branch.

Stephen studied at the University of Paris, where, according to Krčelić, he spent twelve years. He obtained the honorary title of "magister" there, reflecting his education and literacy. However, Croatian historian Nada Klaić incorrectly applied the former data to Stephen instead of Ugrin Csák, Archbishop of Split, and there is no source for that Stephen indeed attended the University of Paris. Mirjana Matijević-Sokol argued Stephen perhaps attended the University of Bologna. Upon his return to the homeland in 1224, he was appointed chancellor of Andrew II. Beside that he also functioned as the provost of Arad. The next year was consecrated as bishop of Zagreb. He was referred to as bishop-elect in that year.

== Bishop of Zagreb ==
This bishop [Stephen] had great wealth in gold and silver and was endowed with other riches as well. Lavish in worldly pomp and courtly, he showed himself well-disposed and easy to address to everyone. He was altogether content to be raised and exalted by the winds of popular favor.

— Thomas the Archdeacon: History of the Bishops of Salona and Split

He styled himself as "Stephanus secundus" in order to distinguish himself from his immediate namesake predecessor. In his charters, he also indicated the number of his regnal years beside the date in order to differentiate. His contemporary Thomas the Archdeacon described Stephen as "rich, pompous and benevolent, but glory seeker" in his work Historia Salonitana. During his episcopacy, the diocese of Zagreb saw cultural, educational, and economic flourishing, while literacy became widespread within his chancellery. The foundation of Franciscan, Dominican, Cistercian and Pauline monasteries in Zagreb, Čazma, Virovitica and Ivanić Grad contributed to this advancement. In the latter place, he built a nunnery and the church of St. Mary intended for the Cistercians. The Dominicans established liberal arts and theology studies for priests and laypeople in their friaries in Zagreb and Čazma. Influenced by his experience in Paris (or Bologna), Stephen II contributed to the education of local clergy and published Liber quaestionum et sententiarum (the Book of Questions and Meanings). Inspired by the ascetic life of the Franciscans and Dominicans, Stephen II solved the issue of the tithe on the benefit of the poor strata. Under Stephen, the chapter of Zagreb, as early as 1228, became a place of authentication.

Stephen moved to the Roman Curia in 1226 where he managed to get Pope Honorius III to reopen the lawsuit with the Abbey of Pannonhalma over the tithes in the lands beyond the Drava river, despite the fact that the Diocese of Zagreb had previously lost the lawsuit in Hungary. Thereafter, the pope granted the title of papal subdeacon to Stephen. The bishop donated the surrounding tithes and incomes (including Gorizia) to the cathedral chapter of Zagreb in 1227. Upon Stephen's request, Pope Gregory IX confirmed the former land donations of kings Emeric and Andrew II to the diocese in July 1227. The former donation letter of Andrew II (1217) was, in fact, a forgery compiled by Stephen and his chancellery at the turn of 1226 and 1227 for the lawsuit against the Pannonhalma Abbey, which was such a well-executed document that it even deceived the royal chancellery later, which confirmed and transcribed it in 1269 and 1271.

Stephen II reorganized the parishes in the Diocese of Zagreb and in 1232 established a collegiate chapter in Čazma (also known as Bjenik or Pobjenik) with twelve canons, where he constructed a nearby settlement of Nova Čazma. The chapter had the opportunity to elect their provost from among the four candidates for the bishop of Zagreb, all of whom were members of the chapter of Zagreb. Historian Csaba Juhász analyzed the unique arenga (prelude) of the founding diploma of the Čazma Chapter, which paraphrases much of wisdom from the works of Saint Gregory the Great. He argued Stephen and his chancellor Andrew actively participated in the drafting of the document. Altogether eleven charters were preserved during Stephen's episcopate: two last wills and testaments (of the aforementioned Sal Atyusz), six letters of donation and a letter of privileges, which guaranteed the disposition of property upon death for the canons of Čazma. They were the first documents written in an office in Slavonia. They reflect still informal forms and do not have a date or place of publication, but their emergence in the newly established episcopal office in itself testifies to the role played by Stephen in the field of literacy. Stephen often used typical topos of royal deeds of donation in the arengas or narratios of his letters of donation, and also contain elements from the Bible and the works of Saint Gregory the Great. Stephen invited Dominican friars to his diocese in order to counterbalance the spread of Bogomilism. During the First Mongol invasion of Hungary in 1241, Stephen left his diocese and fled to the coast of the Adriatic Sea. There, he joined the accompaniment of Béla IV, who took refugee in the well-fortified Trogir.

King Béla's younger brother, Duke Coloman governed Slavonia since 1226. Stephen was considered his most loyal confidant in the province, where the overwhelming part of the territory of the Diocese of Zagreb lay. Their cooperation was described as the era of "little Renaissance" in the 13th-century Slavonia by Croatian historian Vladimir P. Goss. They jointly built the Church of St. Mary Magdalene and the surrounding monasteries in Čazma around 1230. Coloman already initiated the merger of the Archbishopric of Split and the Bishopric of Zagreb, which would have extracted the latter diocese from the administration of the Hungarian ecclesiastical organization. However, Pope Gregory IX reminded him in June 1240, that the two dioceses could not be united without the consent of the archbishop of Kalocsa – superior of the bishop of Zagreb – and the chapters of their sees. Some historians argued Stephen was ambitious in the elevation of his diocese to the status of an archdiocese. Accordingly, Stephen and his successors would have been the "Primate of Dalmatia, Croatia and Slavonia", instead of the archbishop of Split. Coloman was mortally wounded in the Battle of Mohi in April 1241, Stephen left without a protégé.

Despite that, Stephen was elected Archbishop of Split by the local laity and clergy in 1242, when he resided in the town along with Béla and the royal court. His dual jurisdiction would be brought the unity of Croatia (Split) with Slavonia (Zagreb). He was mentioned as archbishop-elect in the period between July 1242 and November 1243. Without prominent support (there was also a long-standing sede vacante in the Holy See from 1241 to 1243), Stephen had to renounce the episcopacy in Split. According to Thomas the Archdeacon, his successor as archbishop-elect, Stephen insisted on a set of conditions that the recently elected Pope Innocent IV found unacceptable, which forced Stephen's withdrawal from the position.

Thereafter, Stephen returned to Slavonia and actively supported the reconstruction policy of Béla IV after the Mongol withdrawal. The Diocese of Zagreb also suffered heavy damages and losses. According to a non-authentic charter from 1244, the diocese was completely destroyed, and the local inhabitants and guests (hospes) fled. "Feeling the material and spiritual losses suffered by the church", Stephen confirmed the inhabitants of the town of Zagreb and the guest peoples of the nearby Latin (i.e. Italian or Dalmatian) district belonging to it in their original freedom. Stephen died in Čazma on 10 July 1247. He was buried in the local Church of St. Mary Magdalene.

== Sources ==
=== Primary sources ===
- Archdeacon Thomas of Split: History of the Bishops of Salona and Split (Latin text by Olga Perić, edited, translated and annotated by Damir Karbić, Mirjana Matijević Sokol and James Ross Sweeney) (2006). CEU Press. ISBN 963-7326-59-6.

=== Secondary sources ===
- "Stjepan II". Hrvatska enciklopedija. Leksikografski zavod Miroslav Krleža.
- Dobronić, Lelja (1995). "Stjepan Babonić [Stephen Babonić]". In Franko, Mirošević (ed.). Zagrebački biskupi i nadbiskupi [Bishops and Archbishops of Zagreb] (in Croatian). Školska knjiga. pp. 43–45. ISBN 953-0-60597-8.
- Font, Márta; Barabás, Gábor (2017). Kálmán, Halics királya, Szlavónia hercege, 1208–1241 [Coloman, King of Halych, Duke of Slavonia, 1208–1241] (in Hungarian). Magyar Történelmi Társulat–Kronosz Kiadó. ISBN 978-963-467-000-1.
- Gál, Judit (2020). Dalmatia and the Exercise of Royal Authority in the Árpád-Era Kingdom of Hungary. Arpadiana III., Research Centre for the Humanities. ISBN 978-963-416-227-8.
- Juhász, Csaba (2017). "A csázmai társaskáptalan 1232. évi alapítólevelének arengája [The Harangue of the Founding Charter of the Collegiate Chapter of Čazma (1232)]". Magyar Könyvszemle (in Hungarian). 133 (1): 1–12. doi:10.17167/mksz.2017.1.1. hdl:10831/77997. ISSN 0025-0171. S2CID 240041518.
- Juhász, Csaba (2019). "Zágrábi arengák és narratiók a 13. század első feléből [Harangue and Narrations from the Diocese of Zagreb in the first half of the 13th century]". Magyar Könyvszemle (in Hungarian). 135 (3): 279–306. doi:10.17167/mksz.2019.3.279-306. hdl:10831/47054. ISSN 0025-0171. S2CID 239539789.
- Kovács, István (2018). "Az aradi káptalan elöljárói: a prépostok (1135–1526) [Provosts of the Medieval Episcopal See of Arad (1135–1526)]". In Czeferner, Dóra; Böhm, Gábor; Fedeles, Tamás (eds.). Mesterek és Tanítványok 2. Tanulmányok a bölcsészet- és társadalomtudományok területéről (in Hungarian). University of Pécs. pp. 147–163. ISBN 978-963-429-223-4.
- Markó, László (2006). A magyar állam főméltóságai Szent Istvántól napjainkig: Életrajzi Lexikon [Great Officers of State in Hungary from King Saint Stephen to Our Days: A Biographical Encyclopedia] (in Hungarian). Helikon Kiadó. ISBN 963-208-970-7.
- Matijević-Sokol, Mirjana (2011). "Prozopografska crtica o zagrebačkom biskupu Stjepanu II. (1225. – 1247.) [Prosopographic Note on Bishop of Zagreb Stephen II (1225–1247)]". In Iveljić, Iskra (ed.). Zbornik Nikše Stančića (in Croatian). Filozofski fakultet Sveučilišta u Zagrebu - Odsjek za povijest i Zavod za hrvatsku povijest. pp. 55–64. ISBN 978-953-175-348-7.
- Zsoldos, Attila (2011). Magyarország világi archontológiája, 1000–1301 [Secular Archontology of Hungary, 1000–1301] (in Hungarian). História, MTA Történettudományi Intézete. ISBN 978-963-9627-38-3.

Political offices
Preceded by Cletus Bél	Chancellor; 1224–1225	Succeeded by Bulcsú Lád
Catholic Church titles
Preceded by Gottfried	Provost of Arad; 1224–1225	Succeeded by Giovanni Capocci
Preceded by Stephen I	Bishop of Zagreb; 1225–1247	Succeeded by Philip Türje
Preceded by Göncöl	Archbishop of Split (elected); 1242–1243	Succeeded by Thomas (elected)
