= The Actor (1990 film) =

1990 Canadian documentary film

- Directed by: John Paskievich
- Produced by: John Paskievich
- Starring: Ken D'Cruz
- Distributed by: Winnipeg Film Group
- Release date: 1990
- Running time: 24 minutes
- Country: Canada
- Language: English

The Actor is a Canadian short documentary film, directed by John Paskievich and released in 1990. The film is a portrait of Ken D'Cruz, a Winnipeg man of Indian heritage whose aspirations to be an actor were dashed by racism, and who is now working as a portrait photographer.

The film was a Genie Award nominee for Best Short Documentary at the 12th Genie Awards in 1991.
