= Zsurk =

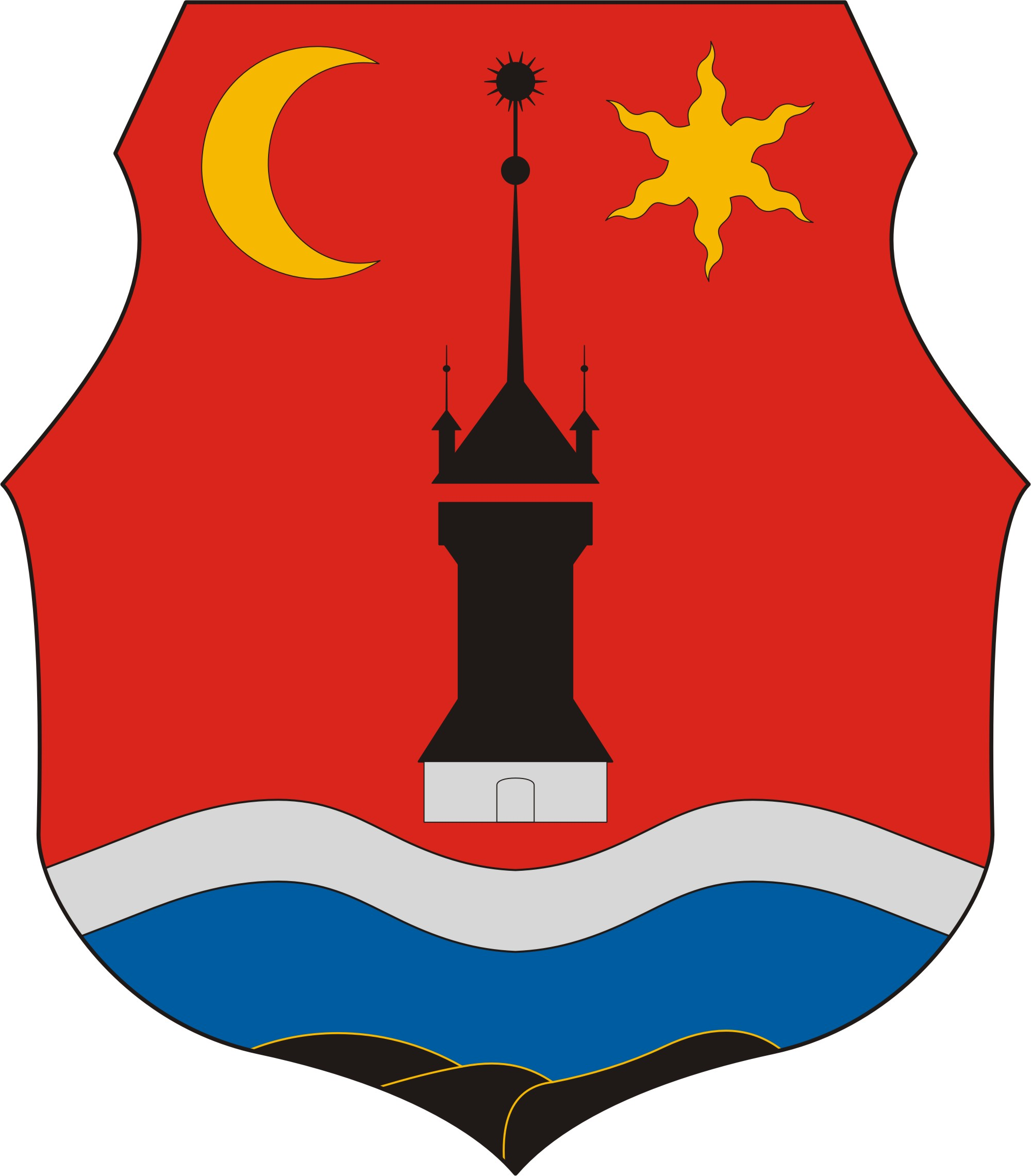
- Coat of arms

- Location of Zsurk in Hungary
- Coordinates: 48.4111°N 22.2167°E
- Country: Hungary
- Region: Northern Great Plain
- County: Szabolcs-Szatmár-Bereg

Area
  - Total: 15.39 km^{2} (5.94 sq mi)

Population (2012)
  - Total: 704
  - Density: 45.7/km^{2} (118/sq mi)
- Time zone: UTC+1 (CET)
  - Summer (DST): UTC+2 (CEST)
- Postal code: 4627
- Area code: +36 45
- Website: http://www.zsurk.hu/

Zsurk is a village in Szabolcs-Szatmár-Bereg county, in the Northern Great Plain region of eastern Hungary. Zsurk is essentially a one-street, strip-filled settlement in the northern tip of Nyírség, on the left bank of the Tisa.

It has only two neighbors on the Hungarian side of the border: Záhony on the west and Tiszaszentmárton on the south. It is bordered on the north by Чоп, on the northeast by Тисаашвань and Тисауйфалу, and on the east by Есень, the latter on the right bank of the river in Ukraine.

== Geography ==
It covers an area of 15.39 km^{2} (6 sq mi) and had a population of 787 people (2001).

== History ==
The earliest of the known sources is mentioned in a transcript dated around 1067. From this we know that the ispán Péter of the genus Aba, together with several other localities, donated his property here to the abbey of the century. A special value of the diploma is that it names the church of the village, the chapel erected in honor of St. Martin.

In 1212 II. King Endre donated it to Bánk bán, the chief lord of Bihar county. Already in 1322 it was owned by the Losonczy Bánffy family. In 1353, the Zichy Document Library mentioned its name as Surk. A 15.-16. In the 16th century it belonged to the Losonczi family and to the manor of St. Martin. In 1477, Zsurk became the property of the Lelesz convent, and then became the property of the Count Forgách family. In 1556 it may have had about 65-70 inhabitants. In 1588 58 families of serfs lived here, in 1591 the manor of Szentmárton was acquired by Zsigmond Forgách, from which time it remained the property of the Forgách family until 1945. At the beginning of the 20th century, it had 139 houses and 896, mostly Reformed inhabitants. In 1910, out of 1,027 inhabitants, 1,006 were Hungarians, 18 were Slovaks, 124 were Roman Catholic, 760 Reformed, and 98 Israelite.
