= Tiba Tomaj =

Tiba from the kindred Tomaj (Hungarian: Tomaj nembeli Tiba; died after 1209) was a Hungarian noble at the turn of the 12th and 13th centuries, who assassinated Palatine Csépán Győr in 1209.

== Life ==
Tiba was born into the gens (clan) Tomaj of Pecheneg origin, but his kinship relations to the other members of the large kindred are uncertain. He owned Lesencetomaj in Zala County just before the murder.

A document from 1216 narrates that Tiba murdered incumbent palatine Csépán Győr in 1209. The victim's brother Pat Győr, who succeeded him in dignity, summoned the suspected perpetrator "before the king's presence", but, instead, Tiba fled the Kingdom of Hungary. After his conduct, the court considered the allegations justified, and Tiba was convicted and sentenced to death in absentia by Andrew II and his fellow appointed judges. Pat was granted the confiscated lands of Tiba, including Lesencetomaj as a compensation shortly thereafter. Pat sold the estate to Atyusz III Atyusz, who himself sold it to Tiba's relative Peter in 1216.

The motivation of the murder is unclear; historian Erik Fügedi considered it as the "first documented political assassination" in Hungary. Bálint Hóman assumed a connection between Tiba's crime and a failed conspiracy against Andrew in the same year, when a group of discontented Hungarian lords offered the crown to Andrew's cousins, the sons of Andrew's uncle, Géza. Accordingly, Tiba would have been a participant of that conspiracy, and had to flee from the realm after the failure of the coup. Historian Pál Szabó analyzed the verdict's narrative and political circumstances (only a single private law document mentions the felony), and considered Csépán was killed by Tiba for personal reasons.

== Sources ==
- Karácsonyi, János (1901). A magyar nemzetségek a XIV. század közepéig. III. kötet [The Hungarian genera until the middle of the 14th century, Vol. 3] (in Hungarian). Hungarian Academy of Sciences.
- Szabó, Pál (2009). "Merénylet a merénylet árnyékában? Megjegyzések Csépán nádor halálához (1209) [An Assassination in the Shadow of an Assassination? Remarks on the Death of Palatine Csépán (1209)]". In Kovács, Csongor; Székely, Ilona; Székely, Tünde (eds.). X. RODOSz Konferencia-kötet: társadalomtudományok (in Hungarian). Romániai Magyar Doktorandusok és Fiatal Kutatók Szövetsége. pp. 380–391. ISBN 978-973-8897-08-3.
