= Bánk Bár-Kalán =

Palatine of Hungary
- Reign: 1212–1213
- Predecessor: Pat Győr
- Successor: Nicholas
- Died: after 1222
- Noble family: gens Bár-Kalán
- Issue: a daughter

Bánk of the Bár-Kalán clan (Hungarian: Bárkalán nembéli Bánk) was an influential nobleman in the Kingdom of Hungary in the first decades of the 13th century. He was Palatine of Hungary between 1212 and 1213, Judge royal from 1221 till 1222, and Ban of Slavonia between 1208 and 1209 and in 1217. He was also ispán of at least eight counties in the first decades of the 13th century. According to later tradition, Queen Gertrude of Merania's brother raped Bánk's wife, which caused her assassination in 1213. He is the subject of the play Bánk bán by József Katona, and of the opera of the same name by Ferenc Erkel.

== Family ==
According to the 14th-century Illuminated Chronicle and Henry of Mügeln's Ungarnchronik, Bánk (Banc or Banco) was born into the gens (clan) Bár-Kalán. His parentage is unknown. The Bár-Kaláns belonged to the ancient Hungarian clans. They considered Ond, one of the seven chieftains, who led the Hungarians into the Pannonian Basin in the late 9th century, as their ancestor. Historian János Karácsonyi expressed doubts about the authenticity of this data since the clans's landholdings laid mostly in Baranya, Csongrád and Esztergom counties, but Bánk possessed estates in the other part of the kingdom, in Szabolcs, Sáros and Gömör counties. Based on this, historian Attila Zsoldos also questioned his belonging to the Bár-Kalán kindred. In contrast, historian Tamás Körmendi argued Bánk acquired the latter lands through royal donations of King Andrew II of Hungary for his court service, which does not rule out that he has amassed wealth in other parts of Hungary.

Bánk's marriage with an unidentified lady produced a daughter. She married a certain Simon. Early historiography identified Bánk's son-in-law with Simon Kacsics, a possible participant of the assassination of Queen Gertrude. However, as historian Gyula Pauler proved, while Simon Kacsics had descendants (his last known offspring was still alive in 1299), Bánk's son-in-law, a certain Simon, who was mentioned by a royal charter of Stephen V from 1270, and who possibly also participated in the murder of Queen Gertrude, died without issue.

== Career ==
Until the early 19th century, several Hungarian historians incorrectly identified Bánk Bár-Kalán and his contemporary Benedict, son of Korlát to be one person, based on the erroneous conclusion that the name Banco was considered to be a version of Benedict. However, the two persons appear in a half-dozen charters simultaneously, so identification can be ruled out. This error had a long-term effect in Hungarian popular culture and literature (see below) and even Russian–Ukrainian historiography regarding the history of the Kievan Rus' (see "Benedikt Bor").

Bánk started his court career during the reign of King Emeric. He is first referred to as ispán of Újvár County in 1199. It is plausible he supported the king in his struggle for the power against his younger brother Andrew, Duke of Slavonia. When Emeric captured Andrew near Varaždin in October 1203, Bánk was appointed ispán of Zala County, which then belonged to the duke's realm.

Despite his former political alignment, Bánk managed to retain his influence and power after Andrew II ascended the Hungarian throne in 1205. He is mentioned as ispán of Újvár County again in 1206. He served as Ban of Slavonia from 1208 to 1209. He held the office of ispán of Bihar County, one of the most important counties during that time, from 1209 to 1212. Beside that, he also functioned as count (head) of the court of Queen Gertrude from 1210 to 1212. In this capacity, Bánk ("Banko") participated in the Hungarian military campaign against the Principality of Galicia in the summer of 1211, when Andrew II intended to restore the child Danylo Romanovich to the Galician throne upon the request of a group of boyars. Thereafter, Bánk reached the peak of his career, serving as Palatine of Hungary from 1212 to 1213. Beside that, he was also ispán of Keve (1212) and Pozsony (1212–1213) counties. During his term, he judged over lawsuits in Szatmár and Bihar counties.

Following the assassination of Queen Gertrude in September 1213 (see below), Bánk disappears from the sources for four years. He was replaced as Palatine already in that year, but he was able to retain the office of ispán of Pozsony County for a brief time. Bánk regained influence, when Andrew II led the Fifth Crusade to the Holy Land. He was installed Ban of Slavonia in 1217. It is possible he held the dignity in 1218 too, according to a non-authentic royal charter. Andrew II styled Bánk as "Our faithful baron" (Latin: fidelis baro noster) in 1218. Bánk served as Judge royal from 1221 to the first half of 1222. Beside that, he was also ispán of Fejér County (1221–1222), and ispán of Bodrog County (1222). Together with his deputy Benedict, Bánk presided over local judicial summits for the royal servants of Újvár, Szabolcs and Borsod counties in Northeast Hungary at the turn of 1221 and 1222, as notes of the Regestrum Varadinense shows, which can be consider as precursors of the later regular palatinal assemblies (Latin: generalis congregatio), according to historians Ilona Bolla, István Tringli and Attila Zsoldos. Bánk lost his positions, when Andrew's opponents, a group of former pro-Emeric lords took power over the royal council. He functioned as ispán of Újvár County for the third time in the second half of 1222, after Andrew II regained control over the kingdom.

Over the decades, Bánk received numerous land donations for his faithful services. Through this, he acquired Zsurk in Szabolcs County in 1212. He bought two villages named Lónya in Bereg County. He also possessed landholdings in Csoma and Gortva in Gömör County (present-day Čamovce and Gortva in Slovakia, respectively) and Újfalu and Jernye in Sáros County (present-day Chminianska Nová Ves and Jarovnice in Slovakia, respectively).

== Assassination of Queen Gertrude ==
His [Andrew's] wife was the lady Gertrud of Germany, by whom he begot Béla, Coloman, Andrew and the blessed Elizabeth. But alas, this lady, without doubt yielding to the persuasions of the enemy of the human race, by force handed over the wife of that great man Ban Bánk to a guest, one of her brothers, who violated her. Therefore Ban Bánk, of the Bor [Bár-Kalán] kindred, cruelly stainded his sword with the blood of the queen, and she died of her grievous wounds in the year of our Lord 1212 [sic!]. Her body is buried in the monastery of the Grey Monks at Pilis. At her killing there was the sound of lamentation throughout all Pannonia [Hungary] and there followed dreadful and terrible shedding of the blood of all the kinsmen of Ban Bánk.

— Illuminated Chronicle

When Andrew II left Hungary for a new campaign against Galicia, a group of Hungarian lords – led by Peter, son of Töre – taking advantage of the king's absence, attacked and assassinated Queen Gertrude and many of her courtiers in the Pilis Hills on 28 September 1213. The Hungarian lords were aggrieved at Queen Gertrude's favoritism towards her German entourage, according to some contemporary sources. Two royal charters of Béla IV of Hungary narrate that Bánk Bár-Kalán had participated in the assassination. In 1240, Béla IV donated Bánk's former lands, Csoma and Gortva to Gecse Türje. According to the document, Bánk had lost those estates for "his sin of high treason", since "he conspired to murder our dearest mother [Gertrude] — he lost all his possessions, not exactly unjustly, for he would have deserved more severe revenge by the judgment that common sense had brought upon him". When Béla granted the landholdings Újfalu and Jernye to Merse, son of Benedict (ancestor of the prestigious Szinyei Merse family) in 1262, the king noted too that those estates escheated to the crown from "our disloyal, Ban Bánk". According to a royal charter of Stephen V from 1270, the lands of Bánk's son-in-law Simon in Bereg and Szabolcs counties were also confiscated prior to that.

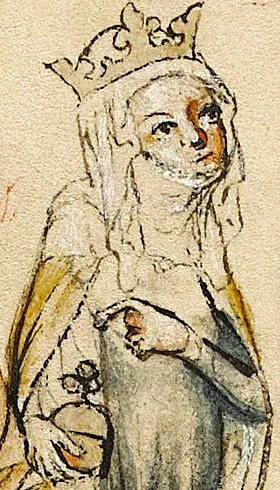
Queen Gertrude of Merania, as depicted in mid-14th century Hedwig Codex

The Austrian Rhyming Chronicle ("Chronicon rhythmicum Austriacum") is the earliest known work, which preserved the alleged story of that Archbishop Berthold of Kalocsa, Gertrude's brother, raped Bánk's wife, which was the immediate cause of the assassination of the queen, who acted as a procuress in the adultery. According to this narration, Bánk led the conspirators and stabbed Gertrude with a sword personally. The chronicle was compiled by a Hungarian cleric in Klosterneuburg Abbey, Lower Austria around 1270. The chronicle claims that Béla IV ordered to slaughter all participants of the assassination, after he ascended the Hungarian throne in 1235. Its text was utilized by the Dominican Annals of Vienna ("Annales Praedicatorum Vindobonensium") at the end of the 13th century. In addition, the annals used other source too, since, unlike the Austrian Rhyming Chronicle, it mentions Bánk's alleged German name ("Prenger") and the exact date of the assassination. The 14th-century Illuminated Chronicle ("Chronicon Pictum") took over the story too, which then made a decisive contribution to making the story rooted in the Hungarian chronicle and historiographical tradition and, subsequently, the Hungarian-language literature and culture.

The fact that Bánk held court positions even after the assassination questions the authenticity of the above accounts, or at least his leading role in the conspiracy. Historian Gyula Pauler considered Bánk managed to survive the subsequent retaliation, because Andrew II was not strong enough to punish one of the most powerful barons, while the main assassin Peter, son of Töre was executed. According to János Karácsonyi, Bánk supported the conspiracy, but he did not mastermind the crime. Historian Erik Fügedi argued Bánk was the most prestigious member of the conspiracy, which in the following decades magnified his role and thus became the executor and chief of the assassination in the later narratives. Historian Pál Engel considered Andrew II had no choice but to be forgiving because he was supported by no more than a handful of barons, therefore only the actual killer Peter was impaled. Pauler argued Duke Béla persuaded his father to punish the assassins of his late mother – including Bánk –, after Andrew was forced to authorize his son to revise his previous land grants in 1228. In that year, Duke Béla confiscated the estates of two noblemen, brothers Simon and Michael Kacsics, who were also accused of plotting against Queen Gertrude. Tamás Körmendi emphasized the late 19th-century historiography incorrectly considered Andrew II as a weak ruler. Körmendi argued Bánk was accused of involvement in the assassination sometime only between 1222 and 1240. Along with other charged barons – Simon Kacsics, Michael Kacsics and Bánk's son-in-law Simon – it is presumable that Bánk became a victim of power intrigues and political purge, and accused of conspiracy purely out of political reasons, while Peter, son of Töre indeed assassinated the queen.

== Legacy in literature and culture ==
Bánk's story, which was preserved by the Illuminated Chronicle, inspired many subsequent chroniclers and authors in Hungary, for instance the Chronicon Posoniense ("Chronicle of Pressburg"; present-day Bratislava, Slovakia; 1350s) and Johannes de Thurocz's Chronica Hungarorum (1480s). Antonio Bonfini, the court historian of King Matthias Corvinus expanded the story in his chronicle Rerum Ungaricarum decades ("Ten Volumes of Hungarian Matters") in the 1490s. Bonfini combined the events with Andrew's crusade took place four years later. Accordingly, Bánk appeared in the royal camp in the Holy Land, where he confessed to the murder. Thereafter, Andrew acquitted him, for he learned of his wife's "sin" which caused her assassination. Based on Bonfini's work, the 16th-century Transylvanian chronicler András Valkai wrote the first Hungarian-language epic poem under the title Az Nagysagos Bank Bannak Historia in 1567. Gáspár Heltai also translated the story to Hungarian in his work Chronica az magyaroknak dolgairól in 1575.

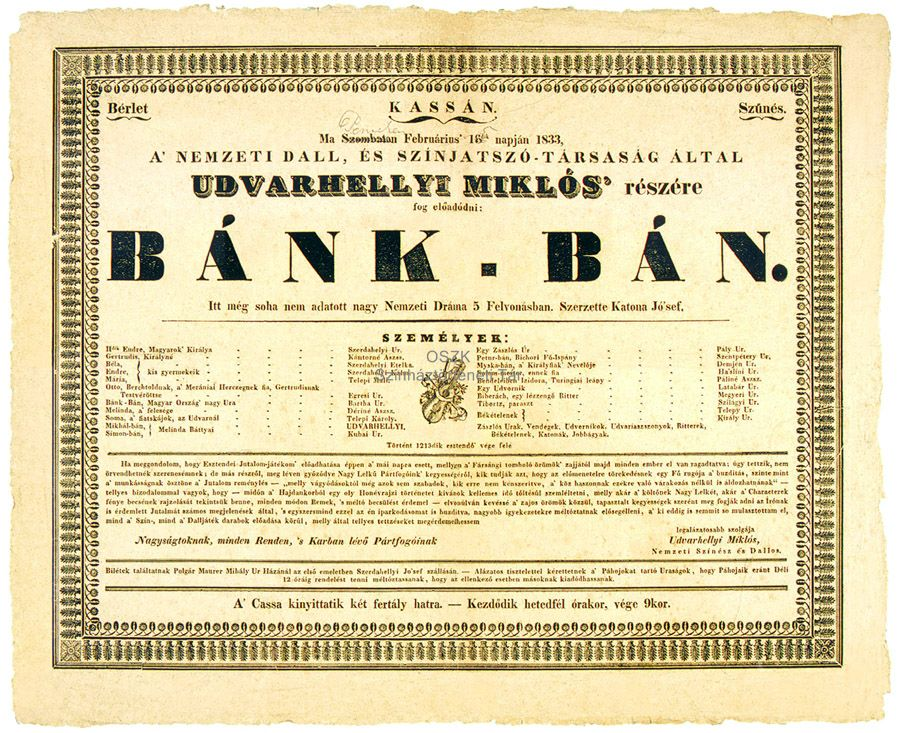
Premiere of the stage play Bánk bán in 1833

Bonfini's chronicle was also translated into German in 1545, which allowed the story of Bánk to spread in the German-speaking territories as well. Poet Hans Sachs wrote a tragedy on Ban Bánk under the title Andreas der ungarisch König mit Bankbano seinem getreutem Statthalter in 1561, updating the story to his own age at a few points (for instance, the appearance of the Ottoman Empire as enemy and the theses of the Reformation). The English playwright George Lillo also processed the story, but modified the plot at several points in his play Elmerick, or Justice Triumphant in 1739. The German poet Ludwig Heinrich von Nicolay wrote a ballad in the subject around 1795, while Johann Friedrich Ernst Albrecht created a dramatic poem (Der gerechte Andreas) in 1797. Independently from Katona's play and its derivative works, Austrian dramatist Franz Grillparzer wrote his historical tragedy in the subject (Ein treuer Diener seines Herrn) in 1826.

József Katona wrote the first edition of his play Bánk bán in 1814. He completely reworked the text in 1819, which was first printed in 1820. Its premiere, however, took place only in 1833. Katona utilized mostly the texts of Bonfini, Sachs, Valkai and Heltai. Despite the initial lack of interest of success, Katona's stage play became symbol of the Hungarian national revival; it was presented on the eve of the Hungarian Revolution of 1848. Based on Katona's work, Ferenc Erkel composed an opera in 3 acts with the same name, also using the libretto by Béni Egressy. The opera was first performed at the Pesti Nemzeti Magyar Szinház in Pest on 9 March 1861. The Bánk bán is labelled as Hungary's national opera.

In the play and the opera, the character of Bánk appears as a tragic hero and "defender" of the Hungarian national interests against the "oppressive" Queen Gertrude and her foreign courtiers. Since the early 19th-century historiography still assumed identity between Bánk and Benedict, son of Korlát, Katona called Bánk as "the son of Conrad" and modeled his fictional wife Melinda on the "beautiful" court lady Tota, who was the spouse of Benedict. As Tota belonged to the Nagymartoni family of Aragonese origin, Katona mistakenly connected "Melinda" to the kinship. In his play, Melinda's brothers, bans Mikhal and Simon of Boioth were of Spanish origin. Both of them are involved in the assassination. In fact, another couple of brothers, Simon and Michael Kacsics were that nobles, who were embroiled in suspicion of their involvement in the murder. In Katona's stage play, Gertrude's another brother Otto, who raped Bánk's wife, instead of Archbishop Berthold. In reality, Otto never stayed in Hungary.

== Sources ==
=== Primary sources ===
- Bak, János M.; Veszprémy, László; Kersken, Norbert (2018). Chronica de gestis Hungarorum e codice picto saec. XIV [The Illuminated Chronicle: Chronicle of the deeds of the Hungarians from the fourteenth-century illuminated codex]. Budapest: Central European University Press. ISBN 978-9-6338-6264-3.

=== Secondary sources ===
- Engel, Pál (2001). The Realm of St Stephen: A History of Medieval Hungary, 895–1526. I.B. Tauris Publishers. ISBN 1-86064-061-3.
- Font, Márta (2021). The Kings of the House of Árpád and the Rurikid Princes. Cooperation and conflict in medieval Hungary and Kievan Rus'. Arpadiana VIII., Research Centre for the Humanities. ISBN 978-963-416-278-0.
- Fügedi, Erik (1986). Ispánok, bárók, kiskirályok [Ispáns, Barons and Petty Kings]. Magvető. ISBN 963-14-0582-6.
- Karácsonyi, János (1901). A magyar nemzetségek a XIV. század közepéig. I. kötet [The Hungarian genera until the middle of the 14th century, Vol. 1] (in Hungarian). Hungarian Academy of Sciences.
- Körmendi, Tamás (2014). "A Gertrúd királyné elleni merénylet körülményei [The Circumstances of the Murder of Queen Gertrude]". In Majorossy, Judit (ed.). Egy történelmi gyilkosság margójára. Merániai Gertrúd emlékezete, 1213–2013 (in Hungarian). Ferenczy Museum, Szentendre. pp. 95–124. ISBN 978-963-9590-77-9.
- Körmendi, Tamás (2019a). Az 1196–1235 közötti magyar történelem nyugati elbeszélő forrásainak kritikája [A Criticism of Western Narrative Sources for the History of Hungary in the period between 1196 and 1235] (in Hungarian). MTA Bölcsészettudományi Kutatóközpont Történettudományi Intézet. ISBN 978-963-416-163-9.
- Körmendi, Tamás (2019b). "A Bánk bán és a történeti valóság [The Bánk bán and Historical Reality]". Magyaróra (in Hungarian). 1 (1–4). Anyanyelvápolók Szövetsége: 12–19. ISSN 2676-976X.
- Majorossy, Judit (2014). "A középkori Gertrúd-történet utóélete dióhéjban [The Afterlife of the Medieval Gertrude Story in a Nutshell]". In Majorossy, Judit (ed.). Egy történelmi gyilkosság margójára. Merániai Gertrúd emlékezete, 1213–2013 (in Hungarian). Ferenczy Museum, Szentendre. pp. 303–304. ISBN 978-963-9590-77-9.
- Markó, László (2006). A magyar állam főméltóságai Szent Istvántól napjainkig: Életrajzi Lexikon [Great Officers of State in Hungary from King Saint Stephen to Our Days: A Biographical Encyclopedia] (in Hungarian). Helikon Kiadó. ISBN 963-547-085-1.
- Pauler, Gyula (1899). A magyar nemzet története az Árpád-házi királyok alatt, II. [The History of the Hungarian Nation during the Árpádian Kings, Vol. 2.] (in Hungarian). Athenaeum.
- Senga, Toru (2016). ""Benedikt Bor", Benedek és Bankó Halicsban 1210 körül. 2. rész ["Benedikt Bor", Benedict and Banco in Halych around 1210, Vol. 2.]". Magyar Nyelv (in Hungarian). 112 (2). Magyar Nyelvtudományi Társaság: 183–205. ISSN 0025-0228.
- Szőcs, Tibor (2014). A nádori intézmény korai története, 1000–1342 [An Early History of the Palatinal Institution: 1000–1342] (in Hungarian). Magyar Tudományos Akadémia Támogatott Kutatások Irodája. ISBN 978-963-508-697-9.
- Zsoldos, Attila (2011). Magyarország világi archontológiája, 1000–1301 [Secular Archontology of Hungary, 1000–1301] (in Hungarian). História, MTA Történettudományi Intézete. ISBN 978-963-9627-38-3.

Bánk Genus Bár-Kalán Born: ? Died: after 1222
Political offices
Preceded by Csépán Ják	Ban of Slavonia; 1208–1209	Succeeded by Berthold
Preceded by Peter	Count of the Queen's Court; 1210–1212	Succeeded by Nicholas Szák
Preceded by Pat Győr	Palatine of Hungary; 1212–1213	Succeeded by Nicholas
Preceded by Pousa Bár-Kalán	Ban of Slavonia; 1217(–1218)	Succeeded by Julius Kán
Preceded by Julius Rátót	Judge royal 1221–1222	Succeeded by Pousa Bár-Kalán
