= The Gypsies of Svinia =

- Directed by: John Paskievich
- Produced by: Joe MacDonald; National Film Board of Canada
- Edited by: K. George Godwin, John Paskievich
- Release date: 1998
- Running time: 95 min.
- Languages: English and Slovak with English subtitles during Slovak dialogue

The Gypsies of Svinia is a 1998 documentary film about the Roma population in Svinia, Slovakia. The film documents the people within the community, and follows David Scheffel, a Canadian anthropologist, as he attempts to gain the support of charitable agencies the Heifer Project International, the Canadian International Development Agency, and Habitat for Humanity International.

The film was directed by John Paskievich, and produced by Joe MacDonald through the National Film Board of Canada.

== See also ==
- Roma in Slovakia
