= Arad Chapter =

The Arad Chapter was a collegiate chapter, established in the 12th century, in the Kingdom of Hungary. It was dedicated to Saint Martin of Tours. The chapter was under the direct jurisdiction of the archbishop of Esztergom. It held landed property in at least seven counties. From the 1220s, the chapter was a place of authentication.

== History ==
=== Establishment ===
Modern historians agree that Béla the Blind, King of Hungary, established the collegiate chapter between 1131 and 1141. Although the earliest extant document that refers to the Arad Chapter – the so-called Register of Arad – was issued in 1177, a royal diploma from 1399 referred to a charter of grant which was issued in favor of the chapter during the reign of King Béla. According to a scholarly theory, King Béla II set up the chapter in token of his repentance for the massacre of 68 lords at an assembly in Arad in 1131. Historian István Bóna writes that the king granted the murdered lords' estates to the new chapter. The chapter was dedicated to Saint Martin of Tours.

Modern scholars identified the large (50-meter-long) medieval church, the ruins of which were found at Glogovác (now Vladimirescu in Romania), as the seat of the Arad Chapter. The first church must have been completed before 1172, because a cemetery developed around it during the reign of Stephen III of Hungary. That church was rebuilt and a new church (the ruins of which were unearthed) was consecrated in 1224.

=== Heyday ===
For the Arad Chapter was founded by a king, the monarchs exercised the right of patronage over it and it was also exempt of the jurisdiction of the bishops of Csanád. The chapter was composed of at least 12 canons, including the provost who was its head. Pope Honorius III attempted to expand the authority of the Holy See through appointing his own candidate, Johannes Caputius, provost in 1225, but Caputius was forced to abdicate in favor of the monarch's candidate, Albert. The chapter became a place of authentication with jurisdiction in Arad, Csanád and Zaránd counties, in 1229. Ordeals by fire were also completed before the members of the chapter thereafter.

Pope Gregory IX excommunicated Provost Albert in 1235 because Albert refused to acknowledge the authority of the archbishop of Esztergom. However, Provost Albert only yielded to Archbishop Stephen Báncsa in 1246, promising that he would attend at the synods convoked by the archbishop.

== Properties ==
One hermit Andrew granted landed property to the Arad Chapter in Besen, Karád and Rád villages in Somogy County during the reign of Béla the Blind. The Arad Chapter held estates in seven counties in 1177, according to the Register of Arad which was issued upon the orders of Béla III of Hungary. Arad Castle was also the chapter's property and one third of the tolls of the ferry at Esteuerd on the Maros was due to the chapter. During the 13th century, the Arad Chapter acquired new estates in Bihar, Baranya and Arad counties. For instance, in 1223, one Gregory, son of Calad, who had stolen the chapter's 150 sheep, not only returned them, but also mortgaged his estate named Chereuy to secure his compensation for the damages that he had done.

== List of provosts ==
Term	Incumbent	Notes	Source
till 1224	Gottfried		
1224 – 1225	Stephen	also chancellor; he became bishop of Zagreb	
1225 –	Johannes Caputius	he was appointed by Pope Honorius III, but he renounced in favor of the king's candidate	
	Albert	supported by the king, he was made provost after his predecessor's abdication	
1371 –	Nicholas Garázda		
c. 1388 – c. 1392	John		
c. 1395 – c. 1400	Ladislaus		
c. 1409 – c. 1412	Peter		
c. 1413 – c. 1421	Ottobonis de Bellonis de Valencia, UJD	he was a papal notary	
c. 1427	James		
c. 1446	Paul Emődi		

== Sources ==
- Bóna, István (1994). "The Hungarian–Slav Period (895–1172)". In Köpeczi, Béla; Barta, Gábor; Bóna, István; Makkai, László; Szász, Zoltán; Borus, Judit (eds.). History of Transylvania. Akadémiai Kiadó. pp. 109–177. ISBN 963-05-6703-2.
- Borsa, Iván (1994). "aradi összeírás [The Register of Arad]". In Kristó, Gyula; Engel, Pál; Makk, Ferenc (eds.). Korai magyar történeti lexikon (9–14. század) [Encyclopedia of the Early Hungarian History (9th–14th centuries)] (in Hungarian). Akadémiai Kiadó. p. 54. ISBN 963-05-6722-9.
- C. Tóth, Norbert (2013). A székes- és társaskáptalanok prépostjainak archontológiája, 1387-1437 [Archontology of the Cathedral and Collegiate Chapters] (in Hungarian). Magyar Tudományos Akadémia Támogatott Kutatócsoport Iroda. ISBN 978-963-08-7392-5.
- Györffy, György (1987). Az Árpád-kori Magyarország történeti földrajza, I: Abaújvár, Arad, Árva, Bács, Baranya, Bars, Békés, Bereg, Beszterce, Bihar, Bodrog, Borsod, Brassó, Csanád és Csongrád megye [Historical Geography of Hungary of the Árpáds, Volume I: The Counties of Abaújvár, Arad, Árva, Bács, Baranya, Bars, Békés, Bereg, Beszterce, Bihar, Bodrog, Borsod, Brassó, Csanád and Csongrád] (in Hungarian). Akadémiai Kiadó. ISBN 963-05-4200-5.
- Kiss, Gergely (2013). Királyi egyházak a középkori Magyarországon [Royal Churches in Medieval Hungary] (in Hungarian). Pécsi Történettudományért Kulturális Egyesület. ISBN 978-963-642-442-8.
