= Pousa Bár-Kalán =

Hungarian noble

Judge royal
- Reign: 1222
- Predecessor: Bánk Bár-Kalán
- Successor: Lawrence Atyusz
- Died: between 1222 and 1255
- Noble family: gens Bár-Kalán
- Spouses: Elizabeth Győr; N Héder
- Issue: (1) Nana II (1) Lucia (1) a daughter (2) Walter (2) Katherius
- Father: Nana I

Pousa from the kindred Bár-Kalán (Hungarian: Bár-Kalán nembeli Pósa; died between 1222 and 1255) was a Hungarian noble, who served as Judge royal for a short time in 1222, during the reign of Andrew II of Hungary.

He belonged to the Sáp branch of the gens Bár-Kalán as the son of Nana I. Possibly he had two brothers, Peter and Gregory. Pousa married first to Elizabeth from the Győr kindred, a daughter of Palatine Pat Győr. They had a son, Nana II (who married a daughter of Palatine Mojs I), and two daughters, including Lucia, who married Vejte II, the son of Vejte I Csanád. Pousa's second wife was an unidentified daughter of Héder II Héder. Their marriage produced a son, Walter.

Historian Mór Wertner identified him a certain Pousa, who served as Ban of Slavonia in 1216. Soon he was replaced by his distant relative Bánk Bár-Kalán. As formerly he was a loyal supporter of King Emeric, his baronial league came to the fore, when the nobles forced Andrew II to issue the Golden Bull of 1222. He was elected Judge royal, beside that he also functioned as ispán of Borsod and Csanád Counties. However soon Pousa and other Emeric-partisan lords had lost their influence, he was replaced by Lawrence Atyusz as Judge royal and his career ended. Pousa died sometime between 1222 and 15 March 1255. Mór Wertner identified a certain Pous, who served as ispán of Bihar County from 1223 to 1224, with him. In 1255, James and Lawrence Héder successfully recovered their sister's dowry – widow of Pousa – from the late Pousa's son, Nana.

== Sources ==
- Karácsonyi, János (1901). A magyar nemzetségek a XIV. század közepéig. I. kötet [The Hungarian genera until the middle of the 14th century, Vol. 1] (in Hungarian). Hungarian Academy of Sciences.
- Markó, László (2006). A magyar állam főméltóságai Szent Istvántól napjainkig: Életrajzi Lexikon [Great Officers of State in Hungary from King Saint Stephen to Our Days: A Biographical Encyclopedia] (in Hungarian). Helikon Kiadó. ISBN 963-208-970-7.
- Zsoldos, Attila (2011). Magyarország világi archontológiája, 1000–1301 [Secular Archontology of Hungary, 1000–1301] (in Hungarian). História, MTA Történettudományi Intézete. ISBN 978-963-9627-38-3.

Pousa Genus Bár-Kalán Born: ? Died: between 1222 and 1255
Political offices
| Preceded by Ivan Bikács | Ban of Slavonia; 1216 | Succeeded by Bánk Bár-Kalán |
| Preceded by Bánk Bár-Kalán | Judge royal 1222 | Succeeded by Lawrence Atyusz |
