= Ted Baryluk's Grocery =

- Directed by: John Paskievich; Michael Mirus
- Written by: John Paskievich; Michael Mirus
- Produced by: Wolf Koenig
- Cinematography: John Paskievich
- Edited by: John Paskievich; Michael Mirus
- Production company: National Film Board of Canada
- Release date: 1982

Ted Baryluk's Grocery is a 1982 short documentary about Ukrainian-Canadian Ted Baryluk's grocery store in Winnipeg's Point Douglas Neighbourhood.

Co-directed by John Paskievich and Michael Mirus and produced by the National Film Board of Canada, the film is set against Paskievich's black and white still photography and consists of Baryluk talking about his store, his customers and the changes in his neighbourhood. It chronicles his efforts to convince a reluctant daughter to take over the business, despite her fears about the store's unruly clientele. Baryluk's efforts to preserve the store were unsuccessful, as it closed shortly after the film's release.

Ted Baryluk's Grocery was selected for the short film competition at the 1982 Cannes Film Festival. It won the Genie Award for Best Theatrical Short Film at the 5th Genie Awards, a Certificate of Merit at the 1982 Chicago International Film Festival, and the Nettie Kryski Canadian Heritage Award at the 1982 Yorkton Film Festival.
