= John Paskievich =

Canadian photographer and documentary filmmaker (born 1947)

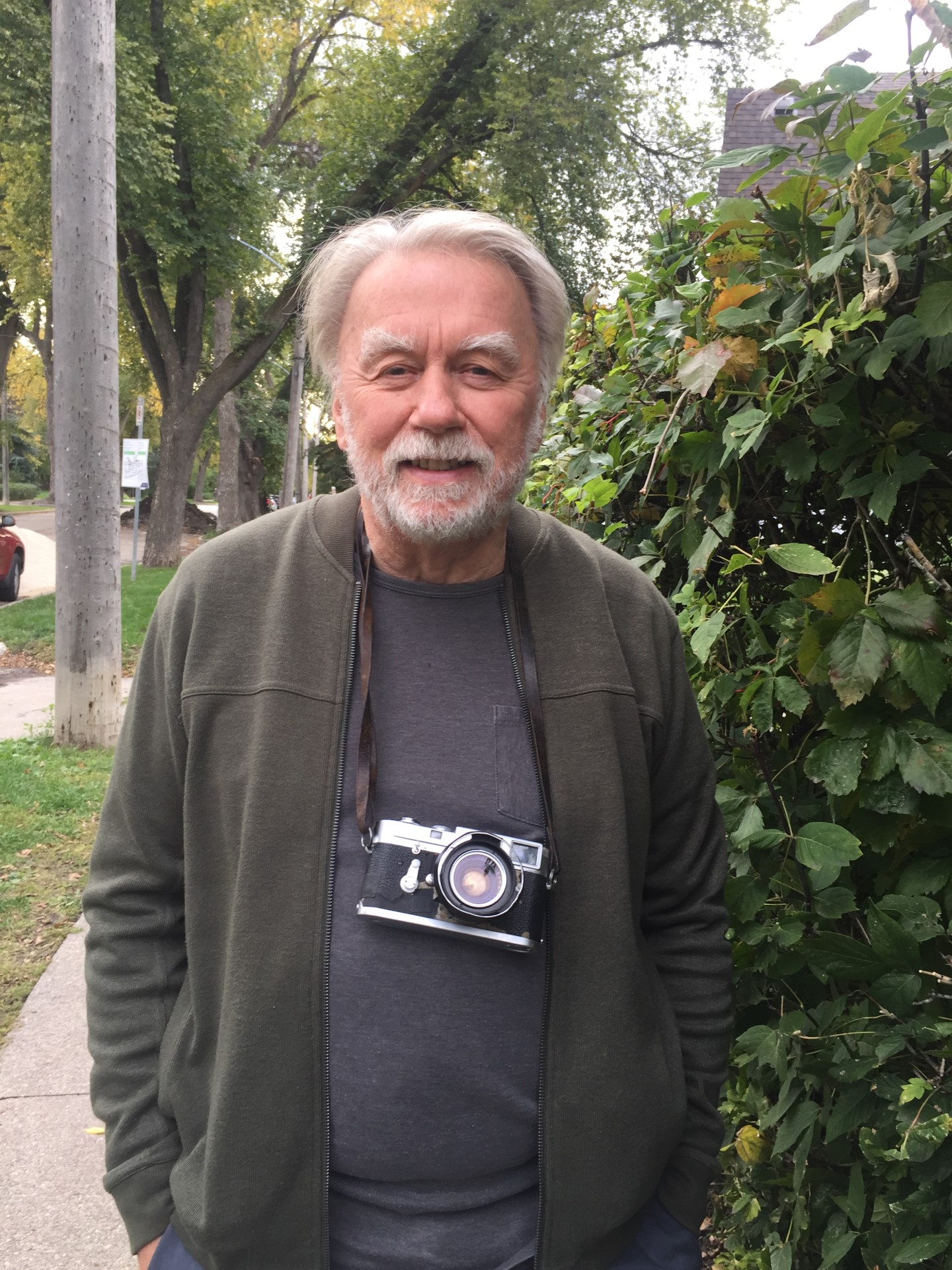
- Born: 1947 (age 78–79); Austria
- Occupations: Documentary filmmaker and photographer
- Website: johnpaskievich.com

John Paskievich (born 1947) is a Canadian documentary photographer and filmmaker. He is known for his evocative portrayals of marginalized communities and his award-winning documentary films. His photographic work has been exhibited internationally and is held in the collections of major institutions including the National Gallery of Canada and the Art Gallery of Ontario.

Born to Ukrainian parents in a displaced persons camp in Austria after World War II, Paskievich immigrated to Canada as a child with his family. He attended the University of Winnipeg and studied photography and film at Ryerson Polytechnic (now Toronto Metropolitan University).

His photographs have been exhibited widely and are in the collections of institutions such as the Winnipeg Art Gallery, the Ukrainian Cultural and Educational Centre (Winnipeg), the Banff Centre, and the Art Gallery of Ontario.

Paskievich has published several books of his photography:

- A Place Not Our Own (Queenston House, 1977)
- Waiting for the Ice Cream Man… A Prison Journal (Converse, 1978)
- Urban Indians (Hurtig, 1980)
- A Voiceless Song (Lester & Orpen Denys, 1983)
- The North End (University of Manitoba Press, 2007)
- The North End Revisited (University of Manitoba Press, 2017)

He has also produced and directed numerous award-winning documentary films, including:

- Ted Baryluk's Grocery (1982)
- The Actor (1990)
- If Only I Were an Indian (1996)
- The Gypsies of Svinia (1998)
- Unspeakable (2006)
- The Storytelling Class
- A Canadian War Story
