= Vyšný Čaj =

Village and municipality in Slovakia

Vyšný Čaj Felsőcsáj
- Municipality
- Flag

- Location of Vyšný Čaj in the Košice Region Location of Vyšný Čaj in Slovakia
- Coordinates: 48.68°N 21.40°E
- Country: Slovakia
- Region: Košice Region
- District: Košice-okolie District
- First mentioned: 1335

Area
  - Total: 4.82 km^{2} (1.86 sq mi)
- Elevation: 230 m (750 ft)

Population (2025)
  - Total: 304
- Time zone: UTC+1 (CET)
  - Summer (DST): UTC+2 (CEST)
- Postal code: 441 6
- Area code: +421 55
- Vehicle registration plate (until 2022): KS
- Website: www.vysnycaj.sk

Vyšný Čaj (Hungarian: Felsőcsáj) is a village and municipality in Košice-okolie District in the Košice Region of eastern Slovakia.

== Etymology ==
Vyšný Čaj and Nižný (Lower) Čaj come from Slavic personal name Čavoj (ča-: to expect, voj: militia, warrior). 1335 Chay, 1337/1359/1382 poss. Chauvay Superior, 1427 Chay, Felsew Chay, 1630 Felseo Chay, 1773 Wissny Csaj, Felsö-Csáj.

== History ==
In historical records the village was first mentioned in 1335 when it belonged to Trstené pri Hornáde Lords.

== Geography ==
The municipality lies at an altitude of 230 metres (750 ft) and covers an area of 4.82 km^{2} (1.86 sq mi) (2025).

== Population ==
Population statistic (10 years)
Year	1995	2005	2015	2025
Count	270	303	293	304
Difference		+12.22%	−3.30%	+3.75%

Population statistic
Year	2024	2025
Count	317	304
Difference		−4.10%

It has a population of 304 people (31 December 2025).

=== Ethnicity ===
Census 2021 (1+ %)
Ethnicity	Number	Fraction
Slovak	324	98.48%
Hungarian	6	1.82%
Not found out	4	1.21%
Total	329	

In year 2021 was 329 people by ethnicity 324 as Slovak, 6 as Hungarian, 4 as Not found out and 1 as Ukrainian.

Note on population: The difference values of population numbers in the table "Population statistic" and in the sections "Ethnicity" & "Religion" is caused by the use of various statistical methods.

=== Religion ===
Census 2021 (1+ %)
Religion	Number	Fraction
Calvinist Church	151	45.9%
Roman Catholic Church	125	37.99%
None	24	7.29%
Evangelical Church	9	2.74%
Greek Catholic Church	7	2.13%
Baptists Church	7	2.13%
Total	329	

In year 2021 was 329 people by religion 151 from Calvinist Church, 125 from Roman Catholic Church, 24 from None, 9 from Evangelical Church, 7 from Greek Catholic Church, 7 from Baptists Church, 3 from Jehovah's Witnesses, 1 from Not found out, 1 from Christian Congregations in Slovakia and 1 from Church of the Brethren.
