= Bartholomew (bishop of Veszprém) =

13th century Hungarian bishop

Bartholomew was bishop of Veszprém in Hungary from 1226 to 1244. He had been a cleric in the service of Yolanda of Courtenay (d. 1233), second wife of King Andrew II of Hungary (r. 1205–1235). In 1232, he sued Ban Oguz for lands before the community of the nobles of Zala County.

== Sources ==
- Rady, Martyn (2000). Nobility, Land and Service in Medieval Hungary. Palgrave. ISBN 0-333-80085-0.
- Zsoldos, Attila (2020). The Árpáds and Their People. Arpadiana. Vol. IV. Research Centre For the Humanities. ISBN 978-963-416-226-1.
