= Monostorapáti =

- Flag Coat of arms

- Location of Veszprém county in Hungary

- Location of Monostorapáti
- Coordinates: 46.92733°N 17.55675°E
- Country: Hungary
- County: Veszprém

Area
  - Total: 25.55 km^{2} (9.86 sq mi)

Population (2004)
  - Total: 1,115
  - Density: 43.63/km^{2} (113.0/sq mi)
- Time zone: UTC+1 (CET)
  - Summer (DST): UTC+2 (CEST)
- Postal code: 8296
- Area code: 87

Monostorapáti is a village in Veszprém county, Hungary. A monastery was founded there in 1121.

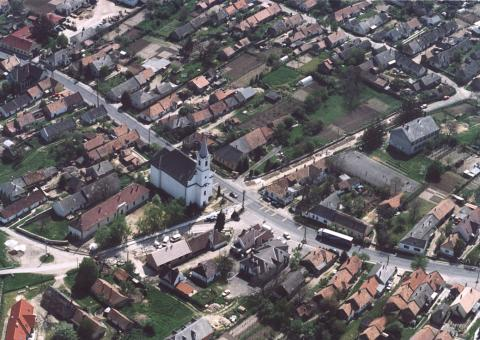
Aerial photography of Monostorapáti
