= Pusztacsalád =

- Flag Coat of arms

- Location of Győr-Moson-Sopron county in Hungary

- Location of Pusztacsalád
- Coordinates: 47.48468°N 16.89994°E
- Country: Hungary
- County: Győr-Moson-Sopron

Area
  - Total: 24.06 km^{2} (9.29 sq mi)

Population (2004)
  - Total: 267
  - Density: 11.09/km^{2} (28.7/sq mi)
- Time zone: UTC+1 (CET)
  - Summer (DST): UTC+2 (CEST)
- Postal code: 9373
- Area code: 99

Pusztacsalád is a village in Győr-Moson-Sopron county, Hungary.

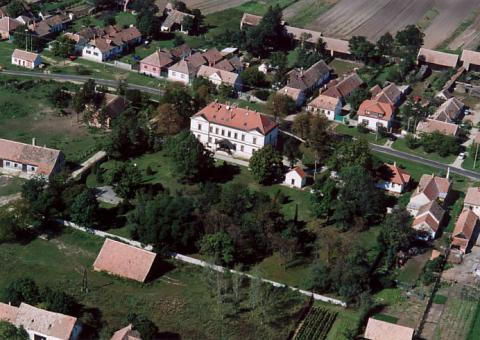
Aerial photo of Pusztacsalád
