= Hövej =

- Flag Coat of arms

- Location of Győr-Moson-Sopron county in Hungary

- Location of Hövej
- Coordinates: 47.54954°N 17.01989°E
- Country: Hungary
- County: Győr-Moson-Sopron

Area
  - Total: 8.52 km^{2} (3.29 sq mi)

Population (2004)
  - Total: 307
  - Density: 36.03/km^{2} (93.3/sq mi)
- Time zone: UTC+1 (CET)
  - Summer (DST): UTC+2 (CEST)
- Postal code: 9361
- Area code: 96

Hövej is a village in Győr-Moson-Sopron county, Hungary.
