= Kalnik, Koprivnica-Križevci County =

Kalnik
- Interactive map of Kalnik
- Location within Croatia
- Coordinates: 46°08′N 16°28′E
- Country: Croatia
- County: Koprivnica-Križevci County

Government
  - Mayor: Dorian Kešer (Free voters group)

Area
  - Total: 26.7 km^{2} (10.3 sq mi)

Population (2021)
  - Total: 1,154
  - Density: 43.2/km^{2} (112/sq mi)
- Time zone: UTC+1 (CET)
  - Summer (DST): UTC+2 (CEST)
- Postal code: 48260 Križevci
- Website: kalnik.hr

Kalnik is a settlement and a municipality in the Koprivnica-Križevci County in Croatia, located on the southern slopes of the Kalnik mountain. According to the 2021 census, it had 1,154 inhabitants.

== History ==
In the late 19th century and early 20th century, Kalnik was part of the Bjelovar-Križevci County of the Kingdom of Croatia-Slavonia.

== Demographics ==
In 2021, the municipality had 1,154 residents in the following 8 settlements:

- Borje, population 102
- Kalnik, population 287
- Kamešnica, population 141
- Obrež Kalnički, population 108
- Popovec Kalnički, population 96
- Potok Kalnički, population 154
- Šopron, population 154
- Vojnovec Kalnički, population 112
Kalnik: Population trends 1857–2021
v

population	1868	1925	2071	2375	2566	2740	2601	2738	2696	2695	2698	2458	2200	1929	1611	1351	1154
	1857	1869	1880	1890	1900	1910	1921	1931	1948	1953	1961	1971	1981	1991	2001	2011	2021

Sources: Croatian Bureau of Statistics publications

== Administration ==
The current mayor of Kalnik is Dorian Kešer (Free Voters Group) and the Kalnik Municipal Council consists of 9 seats.

Groups	Councilors per group
Free Voters Group	5 / 9
HDZ	2 / 9
SDP	2 / 9
