= Almád Abbey =

12th to 16th century Benedictine monastery in Hungary

Coordinates: 46.92890929375096°N 17.5847036105364°E

- Interactive map of Almád Abbey

Monastery information
- Order: Benedictine
- Established: 1121
- Disestablished: 1540s
- Dedication: Mary the Virgin and the All Saints
- Diocese: Veszprém; Esztergom (in 1449)
- Controlled churches: St. Dominic Church

People
- Founders: Atyusz I and Miksa I from the Atyusz kindred

Site
- Location: Monostorapáti, Veszprém County, Hungary

The Almád Abbey was a Benedictine monastery established at Almád in Zala County in the Kingdom of Hungary in 1121 (today Monostorapáti, Veszprém County). Its founders were Atyusz I and Miska I from the Atyusz kindred, who fulfilled their father's will with the foundation. The monastery was dedicated to Mary the Virgin and the All Saints. The deed of the foundation of the monastery was translated and published by Imre Szentpétery in 1927.

== Sources ==
- Nemes, Gábor (2006). "Az Atyusz nemzetség". In J. Újváry, Zsuzsanna (ed.). Tanulmányok évszázadok történelméből [Essays on Centuries of History] (in Hungarian). Pázmány Péter Catholic University. pp. 13–39. ISBN 963-9206-24-5.
