= Bár-Kalán =

Kindred in the Kingdom of Hungary

Bár-Kalán was an aristocratic kindred in the Kingdom of Hungary. The Gesta Hungarorum states that Ond – one of the seven chieftains of the Magyars during their conquest of the Carpathian Basin – was the clan's forefather. The first documented estates of the clan were located in Baranya and Esztergom Counties.

== Notable members ==
- Kalán Bár-Kalán, bishop of Pécs (d. 1218)
- Bánk Bár-Kalán, palatine of Hungary (d. after 1222)
- Pousa Bár-Kalán, judge royal (d. after 1222)

== Sources ==
- Almási, Tibor (1994). "Bár-Kalán nem" [Bár-Kalán kindred]. In Kristó, Gyula; Engel, Pál; Makk, Ferenc (eds.). Korai magyar történeti lexikon (9–14. század) [Encyclopedia of Early Hungarian History (9th–14th Centuries)]. Akadémiai Kiadó. p. 83. ISBN 963-05-6722-9.
- Engel, Pál (2001). The Realm of St Stephen: A History of Medieval Hungary, 895–1526. I.B. Tauris Publishers. ISBN 1-86064-061-3.
