= Nižný Čaj =

Village and municipality in Slovakia

Nižný Čaj Alsócsáj
- Municipality
- Flag

- Location of Nižný Čaj in the Košice Region Location of Nižný Čaj in Slovakia
- Coordinates: 48.67°N 21.40°E
- Country: Slovakia
- Region: Košice Region
- District: Košice-okolie District
- First mentioned: 1335

Area
  - Total: 2.94 km^{2} (1.14 sq mi)
- Elevation: 206 m (676 ft)

Population (2025)
  - Total: 288
- Time zone: UTC+1 (CET)
  - Summer (DST): UTC+2 (CEST)
- Postal code: 441 6
- Area code: +421 55
- Vehicle registration plate (until 2022): KS
- Website: www.niznycaj.eu

Nižný Čaj (Hungarian: Alsócsáj) is a village and municipality in Košice-okolie District in the Košice Region of eastern Slovakia.

== Etymology ==
Nižný (Lower) Čaj and Vyšný (Upper) Čaj come from Slavic personal name Čavoj (ča-: to expect, voj: militia, warrior).

== History ==
In historical records the village was first mentioned in 1335.

== Geography ==
The municipality lies at an altitude of 206 metres (676 ft) and covers an area of 2.94 km^{2} (1.14 sq mi) (2025).

== Population ==
Population statistic (10 years)
Year	1995	2005	2015	2025
Count	238	274	275	288
Difference		+15.12%	+0.36%	+4.72%

Population statistic
Year	2024	2025
Count	288	288
Difference		+0%

It has a population of 288 people (31 December 2025).

=== Ethnicity ===
Census 2021 (1+ %)
Ethnicity	Number	Fraction
Slovak	260	90.9%
Romani	26	9.09%
Not found out	7	2.44%
Total	286	

In year 2021 was 286 people by ethnicity 260 as Slovak, 26 as Romani, 7 as Not found out, 1 as Ukrainian and 1 as Rusyn.

Note on population: The difference values of population numbers in the table "Population statistic" and in the sections "Ethnicity" & "Religion" is caused by the use of various statistical methods.

=== Religion ===
Census 2021 (1+ %)
Religion	Number	Fraction
Roman Catholic Church	165	57.69%
None	36	12.59%
Calvinist Church	33	11.54%
Greek Catholic Church	24	8.39%
Evangelical Church	11	3.85%
Not found out	7	2.45%
Christian Congregations in Slovakia	7	2.45%
Total	286	

In year 2021 was 286 people by religion 165 from Roman Catholic Church, 36 from None, 33 from Calvinist Church, 24 from Greek Catholic Church, 11 from Evangelical Church, 7 from Not found out, 7 from Christian Congregations in Slovakia, 1 from Other, 1 from Buddhism and 1 from Ad hoc movements.
