= Solomon Atyusz =

Hungarian noble

Judge royal
- Reign: 1222
- Predecessor: Lawrence Atyusz
- Successor: Batiz Negol
- Died: between 1227 and 1233
- Noble family: gens Atyusz
- Spouse: Ahalyz (or Elizabeth)
- Issue: none
- Father: Miska II

Solomon from the kindred Atyusz (Hungarian: Atyusz nembeli Salamon; died between 1227 and 1233) was a Hungarian noble, who served as Judge royal for a short period in 1222, during the reign of Andrew II of Hungary.

== Family ==
He was born into the Atyusz kindred as the second son of Miska II, who was an educator of the young Duke Béla. His older brother was Miska III, who functioned as ispán of Vas County in 1214. Solomon had several cousins, including Atyusz III and Lawrence, the careers of three of them had intertwined many times.

Solomon's wife was a certain Ahalyz (also Elizabeth), who came from France to Hungary, accompanied by Atyusz III, and settled down in a family estate of Widhor in Valkó County. They married after 1224, following the death of Ahalyz's first husband Batiz Negol, who, otherwise, succeeded Solomon as Judge royal in 1222 and held the office until his death. Ahalyz was a maid of honor for Queen Yolanda, the second spouse of King Andrew II. Solomon and Ahalyz had no children, and following Solomon's death, the French noblewoman married third time to Bertrand Bajóti, according to a contemporary document from 1244.

== Career ==
Solomon was first mentioned as Master of the treasury in 1214; former archontological and biographical works (e.g. Wertner) referred to him as the first known office-holder who was appointed to this position, however Attila Zsoldos' archontology has outlined the 12th-century preliminaries of the position. Nevertheless, the office of Master of the treasury became a permanent dignity with defined and circumscribed jurisdiction under Solomon Atyusz. He served in that capacity until 1215, when he was replaced by Denis, son of Ampud, the most trusted financial adviser of Andrew II. As the Regestrum Varadinense wrote, Solomon also functioned as ispán of Bács County during that time in 1214. In the following year, he was head of Nyitra County. According to a diploma issued in 1215, Solomon had formerly unlawfully usurped a land of a certain knight Wilermus between the Mura and Drava rivers.

According to some opinions, Solomon had participated in the assassination of Queen Gertrude in 1213, however this assumption is unfounded, as he joined to the ducal court of Béla, who had never forgotten his mother and declared his deep respect for her in many of his royal charters, and subsequently punished the alive culprits. Andrew II forced to share his realms with his heir, thus Béla was made Duke of Slavonia in 1220, while Solomon was appointed Ban of Slavonia as Béla's loyal supporter (who he had known since childhood). Soon he was replaced by his cousin Atyusz III. When Andrew II successfully annulled the disgruntled nobles' resistance movement which evolved to the Golden Bull of 1222, Solomon was appointed Judge royal at the end of 1222, replacing his cousin Lawrence Atyusz, however left the position shortly. A royal charter from 1227 also mentioned him as ispán of Moson County referring to 1222. Soon, Solomon became Ban of Slavonia for the second time and held the dignity until 1224. Beside that he also functioned as head of Zala County. When serious clashes broke out in the western borderlands between Hungary and Austria in 1224–1225, his landholdings in Zala County and Slavonia were plundered by Styrian troops. In the Treaty of Graz, concluded on 6 June 1225, Leopold VI, Duke of Austria promised to reconcile and compensate Solomon.

In 1226, he was again mentioned as Ban of Slavonia in a ducal charter of the newly installed Coloman, Duke of Slavonia, released in Split (or Spalato). He held the dignity alongside Valeginus, this was the first time, when the office was divided into two separate banovinas however it is uncertain, who were responsible for Slavonian and Croatian jurisdictions, respectively. In the next year, Solomon already appeared as a sole office-holder again, when he contributed as a witness in a lawsuit. He died before 1233, when a boundary determination mentioned his former three of estates came to the property of local noble Andrew Igmánd.

== Sources ==
- Markó, László (2006). A magyar állam főméltóságai Szent Istvántól napjainkig: Életrajzi Lexikon [Great Officers of State in Hungary from King Saint Stephen to Our Days: A Biographical Encyclopedia] (in Hungarian). Helikon Kiadó. ISBN 963-208-970-7.
- Nemes, Gábor (2006). "Az Atyusz nemzetség". In J. Újváry, Zsuzsanna (ed.). Tanulmányok évszázadok történelméből [Essays on Centuries of History] (in Hungarian). Pázmány Péter Catholic University. pp. 13–39. ISBN 963-9206-24-5.
- Rudolf, Veronika (2023). Közép-Európa a hosszú 13. században [Central Europe in the Long 13th Century] (in Hungarian). Arpadiana XV., Research Centre for the Humanities. ISBN 978-963-416-406-7.
- Zsoldos, Attila (2011). Magyarország világi archontológiája, 1000–1301 [Secular Archontology of Hungary, 1000–1301] (in Hungarian). História, MTA Történettudományi Intézete. ISBN 978-963-9627-38-3.

Solomon Genus Atyusz Born: ? Died: between 1227 and 1233
Political offices
Preceded by Mika Ják (?)	Master of the treasury 1214–1215	Succeeded by Denis, son of Ampud
Preceded by Julius Kán	Ban of Slavonia; 1220	Succeeded by Atyusz Atyusz
Preceded by Lawrence Atyusz	Judge royal 1222	Succeeded by Batiz Negol
Preceded by Atyusz Atyusz	Ban of Slavonia; 1222–1224	Succeeded by Michael, son of Ampud
Preceded by Aladar	Ban of Slavonia alongside Valeginus in 1226; 1226–1227	Succeeded by Thomas Monoszló
