= Regestrum Varadinense =

12th-century document

Regestrum Varadinense (Hungarian: Váradi Regestrum), or Oradea Register, is a document which preserved the minutes of hundreds of trials by ordeal. The ordeals were held under the auspices of the canons of the cathedral chapter of Várad (now Oradea in Romania) in the first decades of the 13th century. It is "one of the most remarkable documents of social history in medieval Transylvania", according to historian Florin Curta.

== Sources ==
- Curta, Florin (2006). Southeastern Europe in the Middle Ages, 500–1250. Cambridge University Press. ISBN 978-0-521-89452-4.
- Engel, Pál (2001). The Realm of St Stephen: A History of Medieval Hungary, 895–1526. I.B. Tauris Publishers. ISBN 1-86064-061-3.
- Solymosi, László (1994). "Váradi Regestrum [Regestrum of Várad]". In Kristó, Gyula; Engel, Pál; Makk, Ferenc (eds.). Korai magyar történeti lexikon (9–14. század) [Encyclopedia of the Early Hungarian History (9th–14th centuries)] (in Hungarian). Akadémiai Kiadó. p. 713. ISBN 963-05-6722-9.
