= Vöröstó =

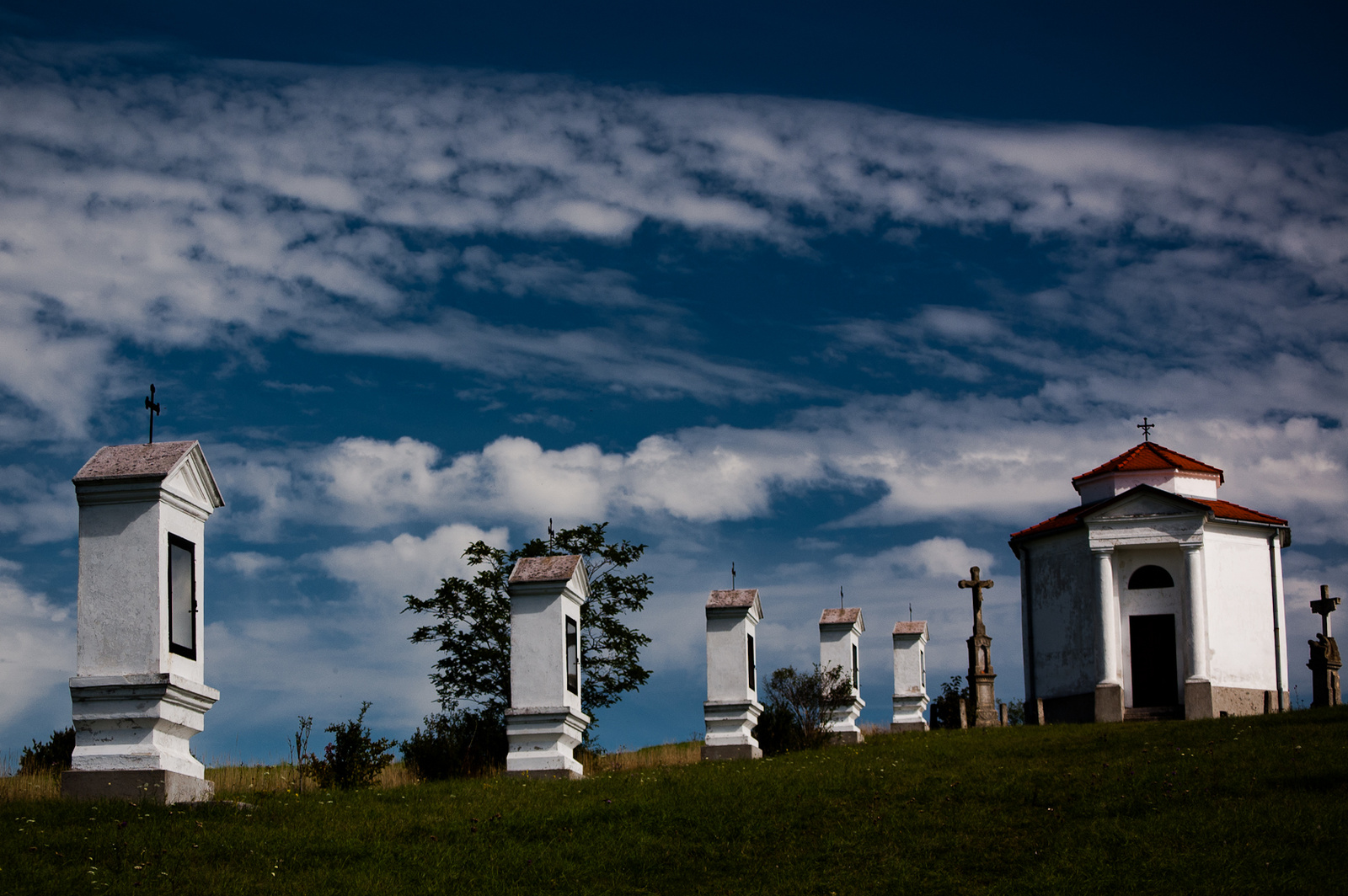

- Flag Coat of arms

- Location of Veszprém county in Hungary

- Location of Vöröstó
- Coordinates: 46.97171°N 17.72312°E
- Country: Hungary
- County: Veszprém

Area
  - Total: 6.19 km^{2} (2.39 sq mi)

Population (2004)
  - Total: 106
  - Density: 17.12/km^{2} (44.3/sq mi)
- Time zone: UTC+1 (CET)
  - Summer (DST): UTC+2 (CEST)
- Postal code: 8291
- Area code: 88

Vöröstó is a village in Veszprém county, Hungary.
