= Lawrence Atyusz =

Hungarian noble

Judge royal
- Reign: 1222
- Predecessor: Pousa Bár-Kalán
- Successor: Solomon Atyusz
- Died: after 1224
- Noble family: gens Atyusz
- Spouse: unknown
- Issue: none
- Father: Atyusz II

Lawrence from the kindred Atyusz (Hungarian: Atyusz nembeli Lőrinc; died after 1224) was a Hungarian noble, who served as Judge royal for a short time in 1222, during the reign of Andrew II of Hungary.

He was born into the Atyusz kindred as the second son of Atyusz II. His older brother was Atyusz III, who also functioned as Judge royal from 1215 to 1217. Former genealogical works referred to Lawrence incorrectly as the child of Atyusz III. Lawrence had no descendants.

Lawrence had participated in the Fifth Crusade and was also appointed Master of the cupbearers by King Andrew II in 1217, replacing the Hont-Pázmány brothers, Sebes and Alexander. He held the office until 1221, beside that he also served as ispán of Újvár and Keve Counties in 1221. According to historian Attila Zsoldos, he was elected Judge royal for a short time in 1222, during the nobles' resistance movement which soon evolved into the forced issuance of the Golden Bull of 1222 by Andrew II. He also functioned as head of Nyitra County in 1222. However he was soon replaced by his cousin, Solomon as Judge royal. Lawrence held the office of ispán of Újvár County for the second time between 1222 and 1224.

== Sources ==
- Nemes, Gábor (2006). "Az Atyusz nemzetség". In J. Újváry, Zsuzsanna (ed.). Tanulmányok évszázadok történelméből [Essays on Centuries of History] (in Hungarian). Pázmány Péter Catholic University. pp. 13–39. ISBN 963-9206-24-5.
- Zsoldos, Attila (2011). Magyarország világi archontológiája, 1000–1301 [Secular Archontology of Hungary, 1000–1301] (in Hungarian). História, MTA Történettudományi Intézete. ISBN 978-963-9627-38-3.

Lawrence Genus Atyusz Born: ? Died: after 1224
Political offices
Preceded by Sebes Hont-Pázmány; Alexander Hont-Pázmány	Master of the cupbearers 1217–1221	Succeeded by Julius Kán
Preceded by Pousa Bár-Kalán	Judge royal 1222	Succeeded by Solomon Atyusz
