= Kamešnica, Koprivnica-Križevci County =

Kamešnica
- Location within Croatia
- Coordinates: 46°07′32″N 16°30′12″E
- Country: Croatia
- County: Koprivnica-Križevci
- Municipality: Kalnik

Area
  - Total: 2.9 km^{2} (1.1 sq mi)

Population (2021)
  - Total: 141
  - Density: 49/km^{2} (130/sq mi)
- Time zone: UTC+1 (CET)
  - Summer (DST): UTC+2 (CEST)

Kamešnica is a village in northern Croatia, located in the municipality of Kalnik, Koprivnica-Križevci County. The population is 188 (census 2011).
