= Place of authentication =

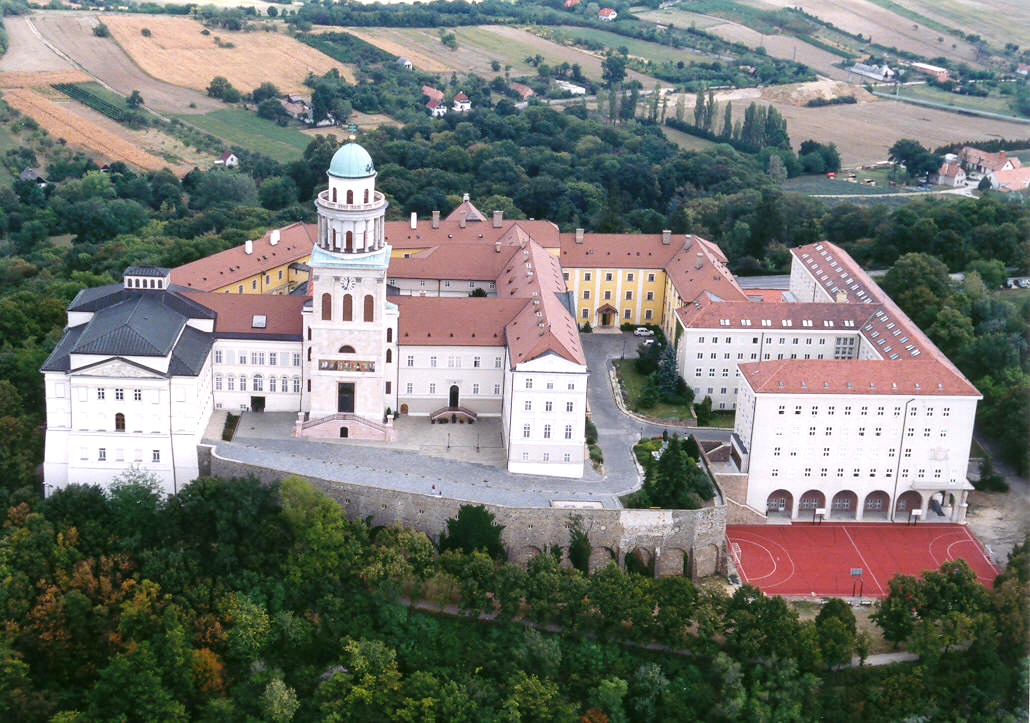
Pannonhalma Archabbey was named a place of authenrication by king Béla III

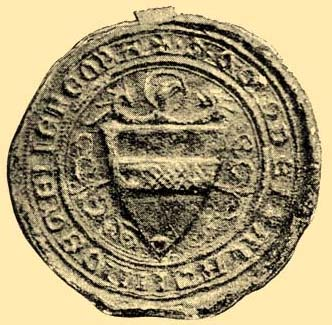
Seal of Amadeus Aba

A place of authentication (Hungarian: hiteleshely; Latin: locus credibilis) was a characteristic institution of medieval Hungarian law. Places of authentication were cathedral chapters and monasteries authorized to provide notarial services, including the issuing of authentic copies of documents.

== Sources ==
- Borsa, Iván (2000). "A hiteleshelyekről [On the Places of Authentication]". In Piti, Ferenc; Szabados, György (eds.). "Magyaroknak eleiről". Ünnepi tanulmányok a hatvan esztendős Makk Ferenc tiszteletére (in Hungarian). Szegedi Középkorász Műhely. pp. 99–106. ISBN 963-482-500-1.
- Eckhart, Ferenc (2012). Hiteleshelyek a középkori Magyarországon = Die glaubwürdigen Orte Ungarns im Mittelalter [Places of Authentication in Medieval Hungary]. Translated by Csókay, Balázs; Dreska, Gábor. Magyar Országos Közjegyzői Kamara. ISBN 9789638814791.
- Engel, Pál (2001). The Realm of St Stephen: A History of Medieval Hungary, 895–1526. I.B. Tauris Publishers. ISBN 978-1-86064-061-2.
- Kőfalvi, Tamás (2002). "Places of authentication: loca credibilia". Chronica. 2: 27–38. ISSN 1588-2039.
- Rady, Martyn (2000). Nobility, Land and Service in Medieval Hungary. Palgrave. ISBN 0-333-80085-0.
- Solymosi, László (1994). "Hiteleshely [Place of Authentication]". In Kristó, Gyula; Engel, Pál; Makk, Ferenc (eds.). Korai magyar történeti lexikon (9–14. század) [Encyclopedia of the Early Hungarian History (9th–14th centuries)] (in Hungarian). Akadémiai Kiadó. pp. 263–264. ISBN 963-05-6722-9.
- Solymosi, László (2012). "A hiteleshelyek számának alakulása a 14–15. században [The Change in the Number of Places of Authentication in the 14th and 15th Centuries]". In Mikó, Gábor; Péterfi, Bence; Vadas, András (eds.). Tiszteletkör: Történeti tanulmányok Draskóczy István egyetemi tanár 60. születésnapjára (in Hungarian). Eötvös Loránd University. pp. 545–560. ISBN 978-963-312-095-8.

KOSZTA, LÁSZLÓ: Conclusions Drawn from the Prosopographic Analysis of the Canons Belonging to the Cathedral Chapters of Medieval Hungary (1200—1350), in: Universidade, Catâolica Portuguesa Carreiras Eclesiásticas no Ocidente Cristão (séc. XII–XIV) – Ecclesiastical Careers in Western Christianity (12th–14th c.), Lisboa 2007. S. 15–28.
