= Győr (genus) =

Genus (gens) Győr
- Country: Kingdom of Hungary
- Founded: 11th century
- Founder: Győr and/or Pat
- Dissolution: 14th century
- Cadet branches: a, Győr-Moson branch: Óvár sub-branch; House of Gyulai; House of Geszti; House of Kéméndi; Gesztence sub-branch; b, Somogy branch: Szerdahely sub-branch; House of Szerdahelyi; House of Dersfi; House of Dancs; House of Imrefi; Szenterzsébet–Szentadorján sub-branch; House of Dombai; c, Baranya branch: Göncöl sub-branch (?)

Győr (Geur or Jeur) was the name of a gens (Latin for "clan"; nemzetség in Hungarian) in the Kingdom of Hungary. The ancestor of the kindred was a German knight, who arrived to Hungary in the first half of the 11th century. His descendants settled down in Transdanubia. The last scion of the family died in the 17th century.

== Theories of origin ==
The next to come was Pot of Lébény, also known as Ernest. he entered Hungary with many warriors. Count Conrad of Altenburg traces his origins from him.

— Simon of Kéza: Gesta Hunnorum et Hungarorum

The clan of Poth is descended from the Emperor (sic!) Conrad of Altinburg, and he came to Pannonia in the time of King Salomon, son of King Andreas. At this time he was called Hernistus, but received the name of Poth because he acted as messenger between the Emperor Conrad and the Kings Andreas and Salomon. In the German language Poth has the same meaning as the Latin nuntius.

— Illuminated Chronicle

Medieval chronicles unanimously considered the Győr (also Geur or Jeur) kindred originated from Germany, who came to the Kingdom of Hungary in the first half of the 11th century. The fourteenth-century chronicle composition (Illuminated Chronicle) does not refer to the clan, when describes the circumstances of the foundation of the Zselicszentjakab Abbey by family member Otto in 1061. Majority of the historians – for instance, György Györffy, Gyula Kristó and Erik Fügedi accepted the theory of German origin. Györffy wrote the clan arrived to the kingdom at the beginning of the reign of Stephen I, the first king of Hungary. He considered the ancestor of the kindred was German knight Győr, who participated in the defeat of Koppány alongside other foreign warriors, and settled down in Western Hungary after receiving royal land donations. Consequently, the county and the diocese were named after him. Historian Erik Fügedi claimed the kindred came to the Kingdom of Hungary during the reign of Andrew I (r. 1046–1060) and also accepted the individual Győr as the founder of the clan. Gyula Kristó accepted the narration of the Illuminated Chronicle, which says Poth (also Pot or Pat) arrived to Hungary during Solomon's rule (1063–1074), but he does not connect him to the Győr kindred; he argues its first member was Otto. There were also attempts to identify Poth or Otto with the legendary Bavarian hero Poto the Brave.

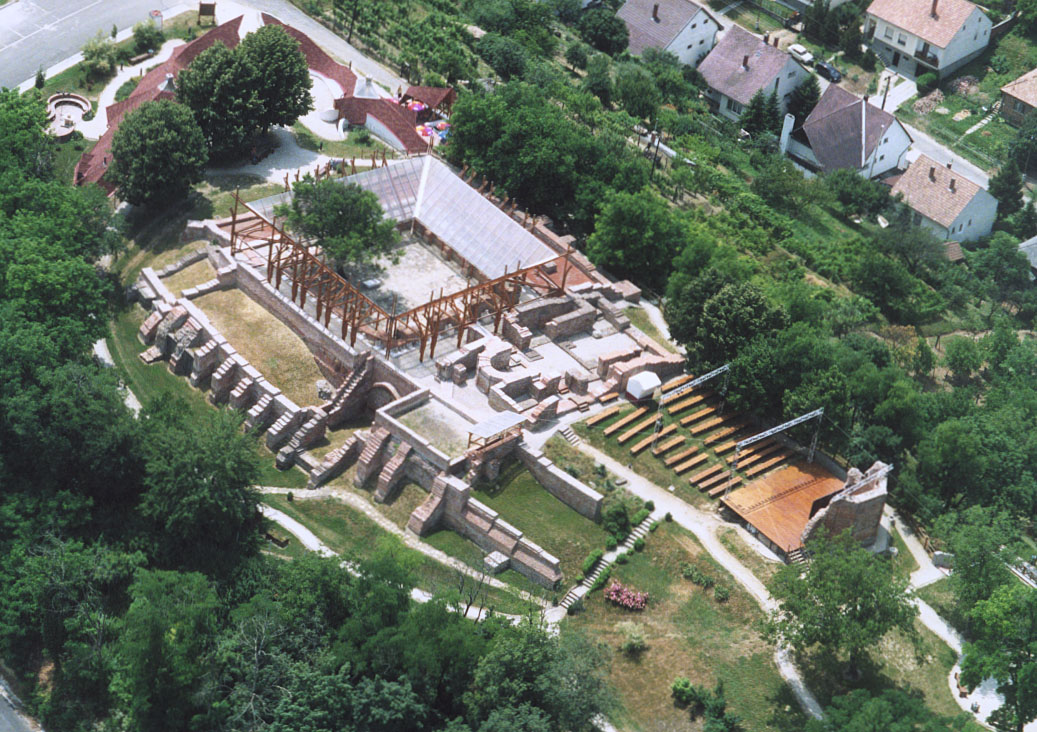
Ruins of the Zselicszentjakab Abbey

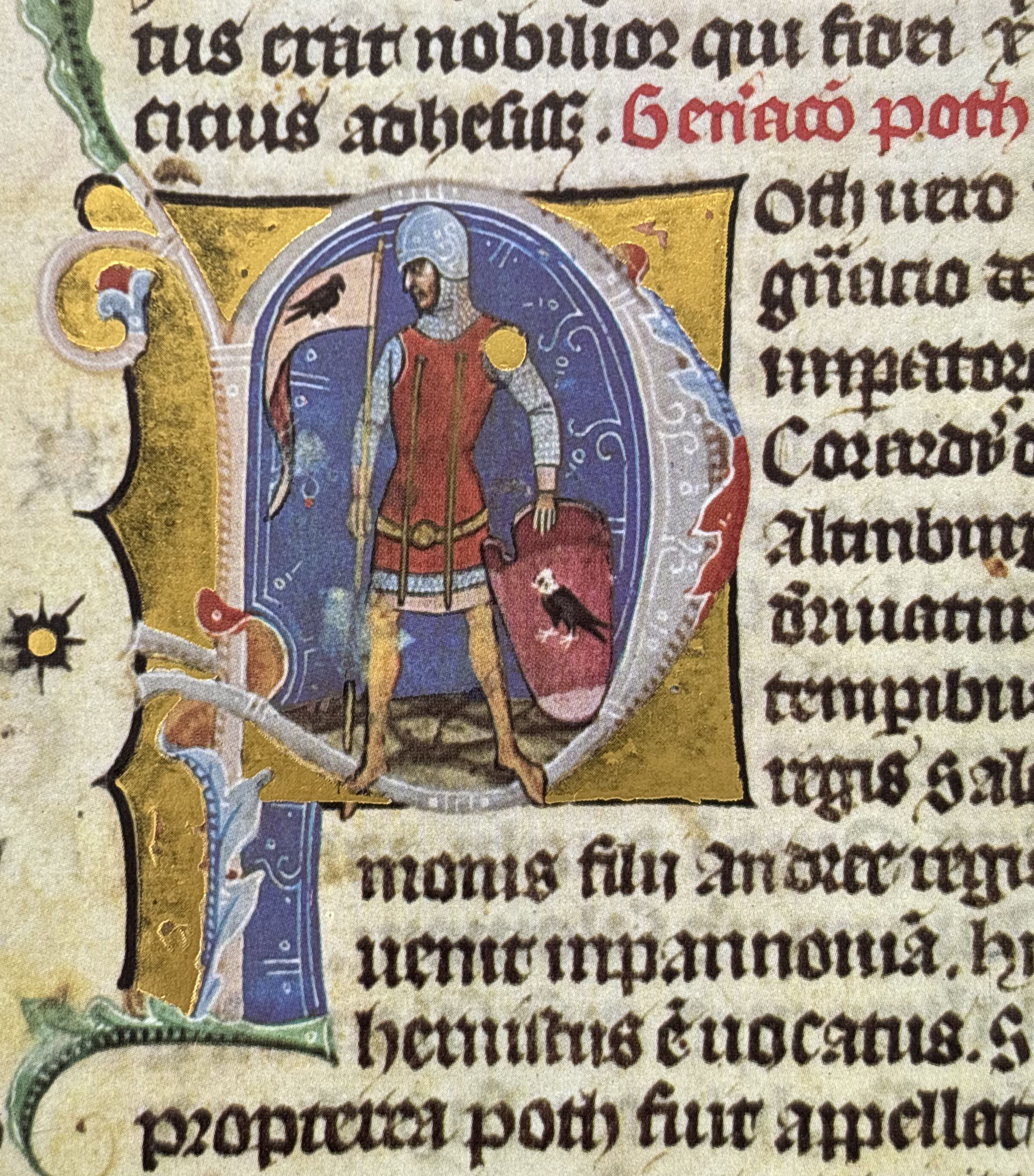
German knight Pat (Poth), depicted in the Illuminated Chronicle

Other historians refused to accept the kindred's claimed German ancestry; late 19th-century genealogist János Karácsonyi did not consider Otto as a member of the clan. Instead, he argued, the first known member of the Óvár branch Stephen I (see below) was also the progenitor of the entire kinship. Karácsonyi also emphasized the members of the kindred bore forenames of Hungarian or Biblical origin (e.g. Csépán, Ders, Pousa, Saul or Pat). Elemér Mályusz considered the Győr clan's native ancestry too. However numerous maternal members of the Győr kindred became related with ancient Hungarian kindreds (for instance, Geregye, Csák, Monoszló and Bár-Kalán) through marriages in the 13th century, which influenced the naming habits within the kindred from the paternal side.

It is plausible that Otto was the son of Győr. He founded the Zselicszentjakab Abbey in 1061, a Benedictine monastery at Kaposszentjakab in Somogy County. The deed of the foundation of the monastery is the first extant charter issued by a nobleman in Hungary. According to the document, Otto excluded his kinship from inheritance of the monastery and entrusted the decision to the king. The terms "cognatus" and "nepos" reflects to distant relatives, but other line mentions a certain Alexius, who might be the (adopted) son of Otto. The document was interpolated by numerous occasions in the following centuries; a note from 1257 claimed that Otto was the son of Győr, which perhaps reflected the interests of the Győr kindred, who were patrons of the Zselicszentjakab Abbey by then. Nevertheless, the narration of the deed confirms that Otto's father (Győr?) had multiple siblings and/or children. Historian Norbert C. Tóth tried to bring the 1061 charter in line with the traditions preserved by the medieval chronicles: he argued Győr was the brother of Pat (or Pot), ancestor of the more illustrious Győr-Moson (or Óvár) branch, while Otto was a member of the so-called Somogy branch (Szenterzsébet, Szentadorján, Szerdahely and Csécsény sub-branches), which initially remained insignificant in the 13th century, but later the Szerdahely branch reached its peak. Tóth considers Pat had also at least two sons based on the location and separation of estates in Transdanubia. The family tree of the early members, according to Tóth's argument:

- N
  - Győr
    - Otto, ispán of Somogy County (1061) and Palatine of Hungary (1066)
      - Alexius (possibly adopted) → Somogy branch
  - Pat (or Pot) → Győr-Moson branch
    - N
    - N

The Illuminated Chronicle refers to an episode from the early 1140s, describing Béla II's alcoholism. As the work narrates, "In his drunkenness he delivered Poch and Saul, who were in religious orders, into the hands of their enemies, and they were killed without cause". Norbert C. Tóth identifies the two victims, Saul and Pat as members of the Győr kindred. He also claims Saul is identical with that namesake abbot of the Dömös monastery, who served in this capacity, when the collegiate chapter was granted privileges and donations by Béla II in 1138.

== Győr-Moson branch ==
=== Óvár(–Kéménd) sub-branch ===
Sometimes in the middle of the 12th century, ispáns Alexander – it is possible, he is identical with that noble, who was mentioned by the last testament of lady Színes in 1146 – and Seraphin owned the land of Lébény, which then became a royal property. According to Norbert C. Tóth, Béla III confiscated the estate, because they supported his younger brother, the pretender royal prince Géza in the early 1170s. It is plausible that Stephen I, the first known member of the Óvár branch was a nephew of either Alexander or Seraphin. Stephen had five sons from his unidentified marriage: Maurus I, Saul, Csépán I, Pat I and Alexander (II). The Óvár branch reached its peak during their generation at the turn of the 12th and 13th centuries. For his loyalty, chancellor and prelate Saul regained the land of Lébény from Emeric. Sometimes after 1199, the brothers founded a Benedictine monastery there. They also built a Romanesque church, dedicated to Apostle James the Greater. King Andrew II confirmed their donation in 1208 (Saul, Maurus and Alexander were deceased by then, but Maurus' son Stephen II was already adult).

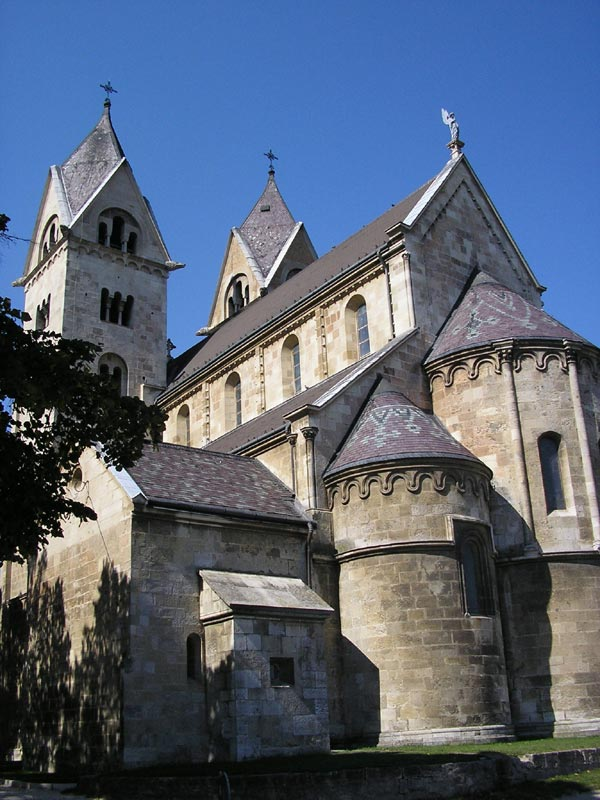
The monastery of Lébény

Csépán and Pat, alongside other pro-Emeric lords, were able to retain his political influence after the coronation of Andrew II in 1205, because the new royal needed their assistance. When Andrew II introduced a new policy for royal grants, which he called "new institutions", one of its main beneficiaries was the Győr kindred. For instance, Pat was granted the village of Hof (Chof) in Moson County by the king in 1208, for his "fidelity" and "tireless strength of probity". Csépán was also granted two royal lands in Moson County: Szombathely and its customs duties and Balogd by Andrew II in 1209, not long before his assassination. Csépán also owned some lands along the river Sava in Požega County, which he donated to the Knights Templar. The soldier Alexander was granted the estates of Bán (present-day Bánovce nad Bebravou, Slovakia) and Sásony (present-day Winden am See, Austria) for his military successes, but he soon donated both lands to the Lébény Abbey. After 1209, Pat I remained the last living son of Stephen I. He received the confiscated lands of his brother Csépán's murderer Tiba Tomaj in Zala County as a compensation, but sold them shortly thereafter. For his participation in the military campaign against Halych, Pat was granted the marsh of Kopács (present-day Kopačevo, Croatia) and its surrounding three fishponds in Baranya County. The king also donated royal lands in Győr and Moson counties to his palatine. After 1215, he never held court positions. Historian Attila Zsoldos considers, he was a leading figure of a group of influential noblemen who was plotting to dethrone Andrew and crown his eldest son, the eight-year-old Béla, but they failed to dethrone him and could only force Andrew to consent to Béla's coronation in 1214. Since members of the kindred's next generation never gained such influence as their fathers, therefore Zsoldos argues that Pat, the last living son of Stephen I, has finally become disgraced for his participation in the 1214 coup attempt. When Béla IV ascended the throne in 1235, he dismissed many of his father's closest advisors. Consequently, the Győr kindred also lost their remaining influence in the royal court by then.

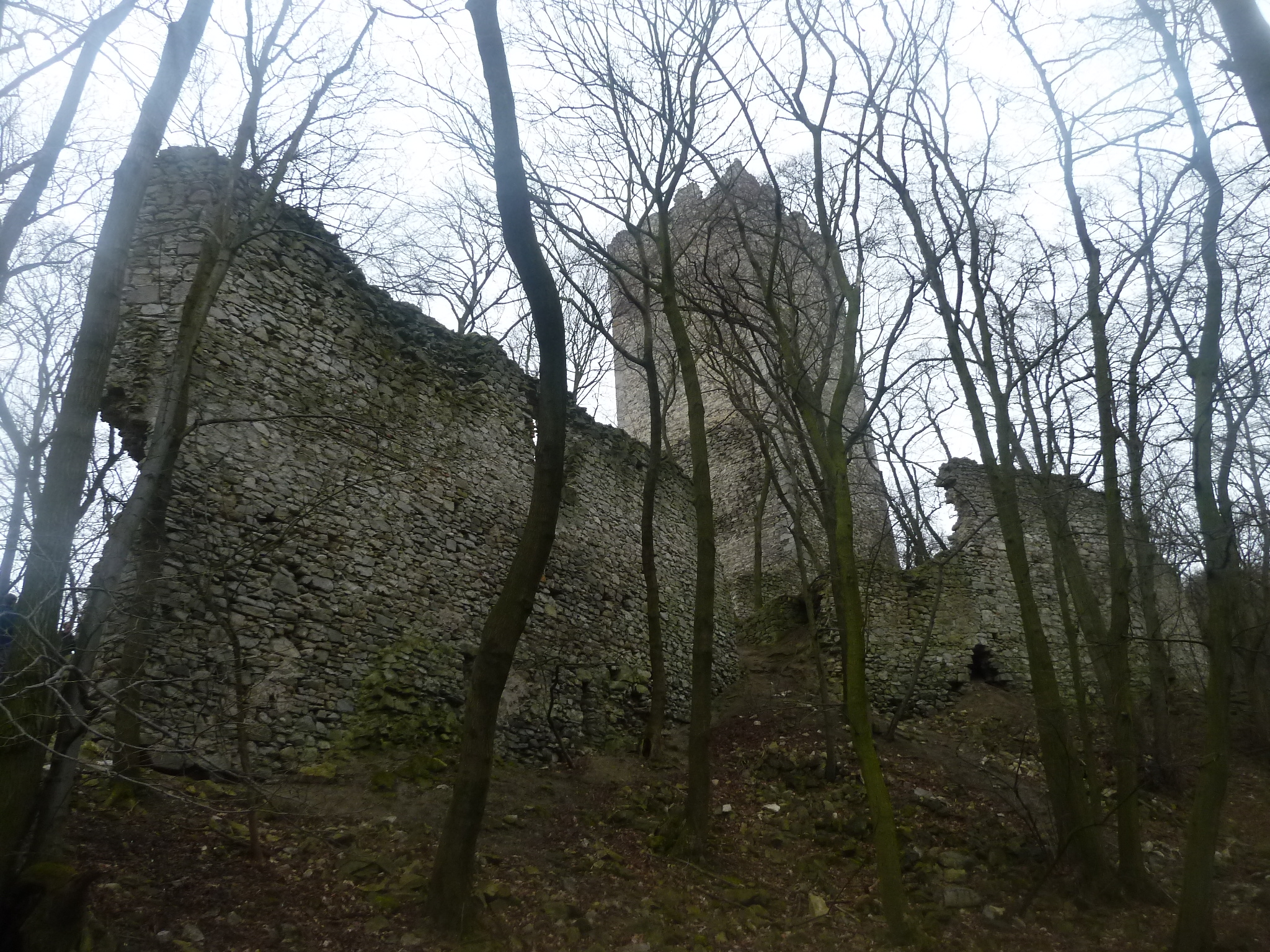
The ruins of Pottenburg Castle in Lower Austria. It was built by Pat I, during his service as head of Pozsony County

Stephen II and his cousin Pat II sold the village of Csúny (present-day Čunovo, Slovakia) to Demetrius Csák, the father-in-law of their cousins Csépán II in 1232. In the same time they donated a half portion of Körtvélyes (today Pama, Austria) to the Lébény monastery and its abbot Leonard. Still in 1232, Palatine Denis obliged a local noble Peter, son of Maurice to pay damages of 43 silver denari to Pat II, because he previously plundered and devastated his inherited lands of Hof (Chof) and Menyhárt in Moson County. Béla IV confirmed the donations of the late Pat I to the Vértesszentkereszt Abbey. After the Mongol invasion, Béla IV donated the lands and patronage of the Zselicszentjakab Abbey to ispán Apor from the gens Apor. However members of the Győr kindred (representing its all branches) filed a lawsuit against the decision; the king ultimately changed his decision. Around the same time in 1242, Palatine Ladislaus Kán mediated between Apor and members of the Győr kindred, magister Saul (Gesztence), Ders (Szerdahely) and Conrad (Óvár), when Apor sworn that he will reclaim the right of patronage. In 1247, Maurus II donated the land of Saulpapfölde (Baranya County) to his wife's family. Maurus II and his son Conrad II died by 1252, leaving his (younger) brother Conrad I as the only surviving member of the branch.

Conrad, a contemporary of chronicler Simon of Kéza, who referred to him by name in his work, initially belonged to the courtiers of Béla IV; he appeared as Master of the stewards in the court of queen consort Maria Laskarina in 1253. He also served as Master of the cupbearers sometimes between 1254 and 1260. C. Tóth considers Conrad Győr built his castle in Óvár (today Mosonmagyaróvár, German: Altenburg) in the 1250s, when Béla abandoned the ancient royal prerogative to build and own castles and allowed the barons and the prelates to erect stone fortresses after the Mongol invasion. Nevertheless, Conrad definitely built his seat by the end of Béla's reign. In 1263, Béla IV claimed Conrad defected to Ottokar II of Bohemia, who issued a safe conduct to Conrad's lands at the border in order to avoid plunder and destruction during the war between the two kingdoms. Conrad fled Béla's realm and joined the court of Duke Stephen. After that Béla confiscated Conrad's landholdings in Moson and Pozsony counties, in addition to the Óvár Castle and the patronage of the Lébény monastery. When the king and his son concluded a treaty in November 1262, Conrad received amnesty from the king, who also returned the confiscated lands to him in early 1263. Following Ottokar's invasion to Northwest Hungary in April 1271, Stephen V relocated the capital of Moson County to Conrad's seat Óvár Castle.

During the era of the "feudal anarchy" (since 1272), Conrad had numerous conflicts and lawsuits with his neighbors and opponents. The advancing Kőszegi family gradually displaced Conrad from the region. His lands laid in the boundaries of interests of the two most powerful and aggressive oligarchic provinces – the Kőszegis seized his villages one after another in Moson County by the mid-1280s and handed over them to their familiares, the Héderváris, while Matthew Csák expelled him from Pozsony County. Conrad and his family receded to their lands in Baranya County. There Conrad built his new seat in Kéménd (today Máriakéménd) by the early 1290s. Conrad integrated into the local nobility, his all previous connections to Northwest Hungary had been lost (except the possessions of Gesztence and Börcs). In 1295, Conrad Győr founded a Pauline monastery at Gyula (present-day Belvárdgyula), dedicated to Saint Ladislaus of Hungary. Beside Baranya, Conrad also had some interests in Somogy County, for instance, he possessed Gyarmat until 1296. His son James was a supporter of Andrew III, but his efforts to protect his lands against the Kőszegis remained unsuccessful, as their dominion gradually expanded into the region Baranya. By the year 1305, he was successfully forced into the service of the Kőszegis, who also extended their influence in southern Transdanubia. Around 1313, John Kőszegi seized Kéménd Castle. Thus, it is plausible that James and his family swore loyalty to Charles I of Hungary, who aimed to abolish the oligarchic system after his third coronation in 1310. James died not long after, in late 1314 or early 1315. His children were still minors ("royal orphans") during his time of death. Charles I retook the castle of Kéménd in 1316 and handed over to James' two living sons, Nicholas and Conrad III, ancestors of the Gyulai (Geszti) and Kéméndi noble families, respectively. However the once powerful Óvár (now Kéménd) branch never regained their lost estates and castles in the territory of present-day Győr-Moson-Sopron County. As both James and Stephen III died before Charles I turned against the Kőszegis in Transdanubia, while James' sons were minors during the military events, the Óvár branch could not contribute significantly to Charles' war of unification against the oligarchic powers. Following the fall of the Kőszegis, Óvár became a royal castle, and held its privilege until the reign of Sigismund. When the Óvár (or Kéménd) branch broke out by the middle of the 14th century, its landholdings were confined to Baranya County only.

- Stephen I
  - Maurus I (fl. 1181–1203; d. before 1208), banus maritimus (c. 1181)
    - Stephen II (fl. 1208–32; d. before 1240)
      - Maurus II (fl. 1239–47; d. before 1252) ∞ daughter of Vekhard
        - Conrad II (fl. 1252)
      - Conrad I (fl. 1239–99; d. before 1302), Master of the cupbearers (c. 1254–60)
        - James (fl. 1282–1314; d. 1314/15), Master of the cupbearers (1291) ∞ Helena Kán of Siklós
          - Nicholas (fl. 1315–56), ancestor of the Gyulai and Geszti families
          - Conrad III (fl. 1315–56), ancestor of the Kéméndi families
          - Csala (fl. 1319) ∞ James, son of Mizse the Saracen (only betrothed)
          - a daughter (possibly identical with Csala; d. before 1328) ∞ Cibak Hont-Pázmány
        - Stephen III (fl. 1302–14; d. before 1320)
        - Catherine (fl. 1302–15) ∞ Miske Rátót of Kővágóörs
        - a daughter (fl. 1302) ∞ George Balog of Harsány
    - George (fl. 1236)
  - Saul (fl. 1183–1202†), Chancellor (1188), Bishop of Csanád (1188–92), Archbishop of Kalocsa (1192–1202)
  - Csépán I (fl. 1199–1209†), Palatine of Hungary (1206–09)
    - Csépán II (fl. 1232) ∞ N Csák, daughter of Demetrius Csák
  - Pat I (fl. 1199–1221), Palatine of Hungary (1209–12)
    - Pat II (fl. 1221–33)
      - a daughter (fl. 1228–58) ∞ Paul Geregye
      - a daughter (fl. 1228–58) ∞ Stephen Csák, Ban of Severin
    - Elizabeth (fl. 1230) ∞ Pousa Bár-Kalán
  - Alexander ("Kubech"; fl. 1202–07†), ispán of Moson County (1207)

=== Gesztence(–Börcs) sub-branch ===
This sub-branch located in Gesztence (from the 17th century, the repopulated village is known as Pusztasomorja, today it is part of the town of Jánossomorja). In 1226, brothers Seraphin and magister Saul, both sons of Somos (or Csamasz), sold ten mansiones from their property in Monyorókerék (present-day Eberau, Austria) to the abbot of Lébény. Nearly twenty years later, Saul was involved in the 1242 lawsuit over the patronage right of the Zselicszentjakab Abbey, representing his branch as a well-educated cleric. He served as archdeacon of Sopron by 1256, when his branch had mortgaged certain lands in Somogy County – for instance, Bajom – to brothers Mojs and Alexander (ancestors of the Dárói noble family), but were unable to ransom them. In 1279, the chapter of Győr recorded that John, son of Seraphin inherited the half of Gesztence (formerly belonged to Moson Castle) after Saul's death around 1262. However John handed over the property to his maternal relative, James, son of Michael, who already owned the other part. Conrad Győr from the Óvár branch questioned the validity of the contract and filed a lawsuit. He regained the whole parcel of Gesztence for 120 silver marks. Technically, the Gesztence branch broke up during this act.

Some members of the branch possessed Börcs too; therefore they were called de Börcs ("börcsi") by contemporary documents. During the 1279 lawsuit, the brothers Pancras, Martin and Stephen agreed that Conrad took over the property of Gesztence. Pancras was referred to as a "royal man" in 1284, when possibly acted as a pristaldus (royal commissioner or "bailiff") during the determination of borders of Balony (today Baloň, Slovakia), which belonged to the castle folk of Győr. When Conrad listed his lands and villages in 1285, the half of Gesztence was owned by Pancras and Martin.

- N
  - Somos (Csamasz)
    - Saul (fl. 1226–56), archdeacon of Sopron
    - Seraphin (fl. 1226)
      - John (fl. 1279)
  - N
    - N → Börcs sub-branch
      - Pancras (fl. 1279–85)
      - Martin (fl. 1279–85)
      - Stephen (fl. 1279)

== Somogy branch ==
=== Szerdahely sub-branch ===
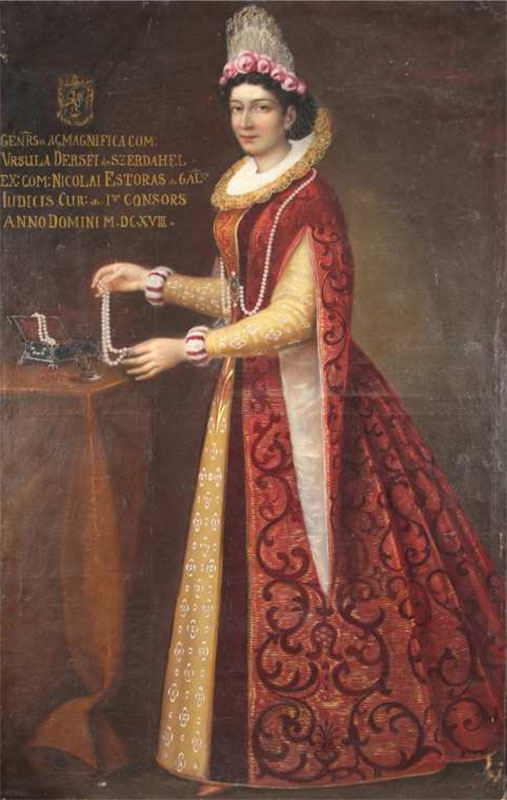
The portrait of 16th-century noblewoman Orsolya Dersffy (d. 1619). She and her sister Mária (d. 1641) were the last scions of their family – and the whole Győr kindred. Both of them married to the emerging Esterházy family, contributing its unprecedented wealth.

As mentioned above, historian Norbert C. Tóth claims Saul, the first known member of the Szerdahely branch was a direct descendant of 11th-century nobleman Otto and his (adopted?) son Alexius. The branch possessed large-scale landholdings and vineyards throughout in the region of Zselic and other parts in Somogy County. Their seat laid in Szerdahely (today an uninhabited wilderness near Kaposszerdahely). Saul lived in the first third of the 13th century. Due to the fragmented data from this period, local historian Péter Tímár considers, only Ders I from his branch, who survived the Mongol invasion and its catastrophic consequences. He was involved in that lawsuit, when the branches of the Győr kindred successfully reclaimed the right of patronage over the Zselicszentjakab Abbey, the kindred's ancient monastery, against Apor. Consequently, Ders was referred to as one of the co-patrons of the abbey in 1243. His ownership over the property of Szerdahely was confirmed by Béla IV in 1245. The lordship of Szerdahely established the wealth of the future families originated from there. A document from 1258 proves that Ders also had interests in Győr County: in that year, he and his sons Stephen and George had a negotiation over the income of a vineyard in Tényő with the abbot of the Pannonhalma Abbey. Ders' brother or uncle was Peter, who owned Csécsény (today Rábacsécsény) with his son Conrad. They had no descendants.

Ders I had three sons: Stephen, George and Ders II. Historian Pál Engel claimed clan members Demetrius and Julius, who were involved in a legal case within the kindred and supported the Szerdahely branch, were the sons of Stephen. Pousa, son of George was a patron of the Zselicszentjakab monastery in the same year. Ders II was the first member of the Szerdahelyi family. He bought Kaposgyarmat from Conrad of Óvár in 1296. Ders resided in Szentmiklós (near to Szentbalázs) in 1321. His two sons Nicholas and Peter lived in Bád and Hajmás, respectively, in the same time. In 1335, Nicholas founded a Pauline monastery in Szerdahely. In 1346, the brothers shared their inheritance, the lordship of Szerdahely during a family contract. Nicholas still owned Szerdahely, while the patronage of the local monastery was transferred to Peter. They received each 18 villages during the treaty, reflecting the wealth of the branch and Ders II's successful land acquisitions during his career. Peter was titled as royal sword-bearer in 1324; his line died out after two generations.

Through Nicholas' descendants, the Szerdahelyi family later divided into three additional – Dancs, Dersfi (Dersffy) and Imrefi (Imreffy) noble families in the 15th century. Nikolaus, Count Esterházy married Orsolya Dersffy, daughter of Ferenc, the last male member of the family, in 1612. Due to this marriage, the House of Esterházy rose into the upper nobility of Hungary. A branch of the Imrefis became a Transylvanian noble family by the late 16th century. Its last scion Mihály died sometimes before 1622 (as in that year, his widow married Gabriel Movilă, a former prince of Wallachia, who spent his exile in Transylvania). The last member of the entire family was Farkas, who died in 1628.

- Saul
  - Ders I (fl. 1243–58)
    - Stephen (fl. 1256–69)
      - (?) Demetrius (fl. 1305)
      - (?) Julius (fl. 1305)
    - George (fl. 1256–58)
      - Pousa (fl. 1282–1305)
    - Ders II (fl. 1282–1321), ancestor of the Szerdahelyi, and consequently the Dersfi, Dancs and Imrefi noble families (all of them bore the "de Szerdahely" prefix)
  - Peter (fl. 1256) → Csécsényi sub-branch
    - Conrad (fl. 1258)

=== Szenterzsébet–Szentadorján sub-branch ===
According to a document issued by the Pécs Chapter in 1217, Endus III, son of Otto (or Acha) sold the estate of Basal (north of Szigetvár) to his relative Peter II, son of Endus II with the permission of Andrew II and the consent of his brother Pousa. It is possible that Otto was identical with that Acha, who donated his three estates to the Zselicszentjakab Abbey in 1190. A certain Chele also owned terra Bosol (=Basal) sometimes before 1190, thus possibly he was the father of Otto. After Peter I died in the 1220s, his property of Kóny was granted to the Knights Templar by Andrew II in 1228, as Peter I had no male descendants. His three daughters were Cheva, Yecha and an unidentified one, who married Macarius Monoszló. Yecha handed over her portion in Basal to the sons of his brother-in-law, Thomas Monoszló, who served as Ban of Slavonia, and his brothers.

The sub-branch also owned the half of Novák lordship. The portion of Peter I became a property of the Monoszló kindred by 1231. On his death bed, Benedict bequeathed his portion (Negoslavci and Balázsfalva) to them too. Only Peter II owned a small part by that year. He had two sons, Abraham and George I, ancestors of the Szenterzsébet and Szentadorján branches, respectively. In 1276, George II and his son Conrad resided in Szentadorján (today Lispeszentadorján). Then they warranted for a certain John, son of Tancs, who was imprisoned by their distant relative Conrad of Óvár for his acts of "debauchery". During the 1298 agreement over the patronage of the kindred's monastery, the Szenterzsébet–Szentadorján sub-branch were represented by James (Szenterzsébet) and Sayan (Szentadorján). Sayan was among the patrons of the Zselicszentjakab Abbey thereafter. The village of Szehénfalva (today an unpopulated area near Szigetvár) was named after him. He was involved in the lawsuit against the Szerdahely sub-branch in 1305. He was mentioned as a comes in 1309. He served as noble judge (Hungarian: szolgabíró; lit. "servants' judge") of Somogy County in 1318. He was the first member of the Dombai family, which had interests and landholdings mostly in Slavonia and Croatia until its extinction in 1504.

- N
  - Endus I
    - Peter I (fl. 1220–1228)
      - Cheva (fl. 1231)
        - Iohanca
      - Yecha (fl. 1231)
        - five daughters
      - a daughter (fl. 1231) ∞ Macarius Monoszló
    - Endus II
      - Peter II (fl. 1217–31)
        - Abraham → Szenterzsébet branch
          - James (fl. 1298)
          - Ladislaus (fl. 1302–05)
            - Paul
              - John (fl. 1351)
        - George I (fl. 1228) → Szentadorján branch
          - George II (fl. 1276)
            - Conrad (fl. 1276)
            - Sayan (fl. 1298–1323), ancestor of the Dombai family
      - Benedict (fl. 1231)
  - Chele (b. 1190)
    - Otto (fl. 1190–1217)
      - Endus III (fl. 1217)
      - Pousa (fl. 1217)

== Baranya branch ==
Norbert C. Tóth considered the existence of an alleged Baranya branch, closely connected to the Győr-Moson (=Óvár) branch; his assumption is based on possessions of lands in Baranya County. Pat II had two unidentified daughters, who became the wives of barons Paul Geregye and Stephen Csák. Through the legal doctrine of daughters' quarter, the lords received Ilsva and Rahóca in Baranya County in 1228, respectively. Conrad unsuccessfully tried to sue to recover the lands in 1258. By the 1270s, Conrad owned numerous estates, villages and landholdings in the county; as he was last surviving male member of the Óvár branch, Tóth argues the Baranya branch (with unknown members) became extinct by the period of the Mongol invasion of Hungary. This sub-branch was more closely related to the Óvár branch than the families of the Somogy branch (see below).

In 1297, a certain Thomas, son of Paul appeared alongside Conrad during an agreement; in 1308, his widow Barbara Negol handed over a third portion of Göncöl estate to ispán Peter, son of Ócsa, the husband of her daughter Clara. Barbara inherited the land from her late husband. The family tree of this suppositional Göncöl sub-branch:

- Paul
  - Thomas (fl. 1297; d. before 1308) ∞ Barbara Negol
    - Clara (fl. 1308) ∞ Peter, son of Ócsa
    - John (fl. 1297–1319)
    - Thaddeus (fl. 1308–19)

== Sources ==
=== Primary sources ===
- Simon of Kéza: The Deeds of the Hungarians (Edited and translated by László Veszprémy and Frank Schaer with a study by Jenő Szűcs) (1999). CEU Press. ISBN 963-9116-31-9.
- The Hungarian Illuminated Chronicle: Chronica de Gestis Hungarorum (Edited by Dezső Dercsényi) (1970). Corvina, Taplinger Publishing. ISBN 0-8008-4015-1.

=== Secondary sources ===
- C. Tóth, Norbert (2001). "A Győr-nemzetség az Árpád-korban [The Győr Kindred in the Age of Árpáds]". In Neumann, Tibor (ed.). Analecta Mediaevalia I. Tanulmányok a középkorról (in Hungarian). Argumentum Kiadó. p. 53–72. ISBN 963-446-174-3.
- C. Tóth, Norbert (2006). "A Győr nemzetség szerepe a Győri Egyházmegye területén [The Role of the Győr Kindred in the Territory of the Diocese of Győr]". Győri Tanulmányok (in Hungarian). 28: 5–10. ISSN 0209-4215.
- Engel, Pál (1996). Magyarország világi archontológiája, 1301–1457, I. [Secular Archontology of Hungary, 1301–1457, Volume I] (in Hungarian). História, MTA Történettudományi Intézete. ISBN 963-8312-44-0.
- Fügedi, Erik (1986). Ispánok, bárók, kiskirályok [Ispáns, Barons and Petty Kings]. Magvető. ISBN 963-14-0582-6.
- Györffy, György (2013). István király és műve [King Stephen and his work] (in Hungarian). Balassi Kiadó. ISBN 978-963-506-896-8.
- Karácsonyi, János (1901). A magyar nemzetségek a XIV. század közepéig. II. kötet [The Hungarian genera until the middle of the 14th century, Vol. 2] (in Hungarian). Hungarian Academy of Sciences.
- Kumorovitz, L. Bernát (1964). "A zselicszentjakabi alapítólevél 1061-ből : "Pest" legkorábbi említése [The Deed of the Foundation of the Zselicszentjakab Abbey From 1061: The Earliest Mention of "Pest"]". Tanulmányok Budapest Múltjából 16. Akadémiai Kiadó. pp. 43–83.
- Markó, László (2006). A magyar állam főméltóságai Szent Istvántól napjainkig: Életrajzi Lexikon [Great Officers of State in Hungary from King Saint Stephen to Our Days: A Biographical Encyclopedia] (in Hungarian). Helikon Kiadó. ISBN 963-208-970-7.
- Mályusz, Elemér (1971). Az V. István-kori geszta [The Gesta of the Age of Stephen V]. Akadémiai Kiadó.
- Szabó, Pál (2009). "Merénylet a merénylet árnyékában? Megjegyzések Csépán nádor halálához (1209) [An Assassination in the Shadow of an Assassination? Remarks on the Death of Palatine Csépán (1209)]". In Kovács, Csongor; Székely, Ilona; Székely, Tünde (eds.). X. RODOSz Konferencia-kötet: társadalomtudományok (in Hungarian). Romániai Magyar Doktorandusok és Fiatal Kutatók Szövetsége. p. 380–391. ISBN 978-973-8897-08-3.
- Tímár, Péter (1996). "A Szerdahelyiek Somogy megyei birtokai. 1. rész: Szerdahely [The Estates of the Szerdahelyi Family in Somogy County. Vol. 1: Szerdahely]". Somogy Megye Múltjából (in Hungarian). 27: 69–91. ISSN 0133-7467.
- Tímár, Péter (1999). "A Szerdahelyiek Somogy megyei birtokai. 2. rész: A Gerence-völgy középkori települései [The Estates of the Szerdahelyi Family in Somogy County. Vol. 2: Medieval Settlements of the Gerence Valley]". Somogy Megye Múltjából (in Hungarian). 30: 55–124. ISSN 0133-7467.
- Varga, Virág (2019). "A Győr nemzetség az oligarchia időszakában [The Győr Kindred during the Era of Oligarchy]". Első Század (in Hungarian). 20 (Autumn): 79–101. ISSN 2063-5737.
- Zsoldos, Attila (2011a). Magyarország világi archontológiája, 1000–1301 [Secular Archontology of Hungary, 1000–1301] (in Hungarian). História, MTA Történettudományi Intézete. ISBN 978-963-9627-38-3.
- Zsoldos, Attila (2011b). "II. András Aranybullája [Andrew II's Golden Bull]". Történelmi Szemle (in Hungarian). LIII (1): 1–38. ISSN 0040-9634.
