= Conrad Győr =

Hungarian lord

Conrad (I) Győr

Master of the cupbearers
- Reign: c. 1254–1260
- Predecessor: Baldwin Rátót
- Successor: Philip Kórógyi
- Born: c. 1219
- Died: between 1299 and 1302
- Noble family: gens Győr
- Issue: James; Stephen III; Catherine a daughter
- Father: Stephen II

Conrad (I) from the kindred Győr (Hungarian: Győr nembeli (I.) Konrád; c. 1219 – 1299/1302) was a Hungarian lord in the 13th century, who served as Master of the cupbearers between around 1254 and 1260. Also known as Conrad of Óvár (Hungarian: Óvári Konrád) in contemporary documents, he was the progenitor of the Gyulai, Geszti and Kéméndi noble families.

== Family ==
Conrad was born around 1219 into the Óvár branch of the gens (clan) Győr of German origin, as one of the two sons of Stephen II. His grandfather was Maurus I, the first known banus maritimus. Conrad also had a brother Maurus II, who married a daughter of nobleman Vekhard. He died before 1252, leaving Conrad as the only surviving member of the branch.

He had four children from his unidentified wife: James, Stephen III, Catherine and an unnamed daughter. James also served as Master of the cupbearers in 1291. He married Helena Kán (or Siklósi), later members of the branch, including the Gyulai, Geszti and Kéméndi noble families descended from them. Catherine was the wife of Miske Rátót from the Kővágóörs branch: thus they are direct ascendants to the illustrious Batthyány family through their granddaughter, also a Catherine. Conrad's another unidentified daughter married George Balog of Harsány, son of Nicholas the Sinister, Master of the stewards in the early 1250s.

== Power struggles ==
Conrad is first mentioned by contemporary records in 1239, when he was already an adult. Historian Norbert C. Tóth argued a hypothetical Baranya branch of the kindred became extinct by the First Mongol invasion of Hungary (1241–42), thus Conrad inherited their lands in Baranya County as the closest relative within the Győr clan. Conrad was a prominent landowner in Moson County, the majority of his landholdings laid there. According to a list of his possessions from 1285, he owned Bán, Régen, Alsásony, Szerk, Gesztence, Szentiván, Szombathely-Fertőfő, Göncöl, Rosenfeld and Csedefölde. Beside that, he also possessed some portions in Csedefölde, for instance, Novák and Réti. Through purchases and exchanges, he attempted to create a coherent and extensive lordship in Moson County, especially in the western and eastern parts, like his contemporaries throughout Hungary. He also had some portions in Veszprém County, Patvására (now an uninhabited forest between Litér and Papkeszi) and Nosztraj (south of Várpalota). He pledged these estates sometime before 1288. He also had some interests in Somogy County, for instance, Gyarmat until 1296. Conrad Győr was involved in a lawsuit with the Gesztence branch, questioning the validity of a contract regarding the namesake estate in Győr County. He regained the whole parcel of Gesztence for 120 silver marks. Technically, the Gesztence branch broke up during this act. Later, he also acquired Börcs through this kinship.

Initially, he belonged to the courtiers of King Béla IV; he appeared as Master of the stewards in the court of queen consort Maria Laskarina in 1253. Former historiographical works considered that his contemporary Conrad Szák held that dignity, but historian Attila Zsoldos revealed that the office-holder named Conrad owned Alásony – as Conrad Győr dit it. By 1258 (or already 1256), he was appointed as ispán of Borsod County, an unusual position for a landowner from Transdanubia. In the year 1258, Conrad filed a lawsuit against his second cousins, the wives of Paul Geregye and Stephen Csák, disputing the legitimacy of their ownership over Ilsva and Rahóca in Baranya County, respectively. Béla IV rejected Conrad's accusations citing the two lady were granted the aforementioned possessions via daughters' quarter approximately thirty years ago.

Béla IV referred to Conrad as his "former" Master of the cupbearers in his 1263 charter. Thus it is plausible he served in this capacity sometime in the period between 1254 (when the last known office-holder Baldwin Rátót is mentioned) and 1260 (when Conrad fall out of favor in the Hungarian royal court until he obtained pardon from Béla in the diploma). C. Tóth considers Conrad Győr built his castle in Óvár (today Mosonmagyaróvár, German: Altenburg) in the 1250s, when Béla abandoned the ancient royal prerogative to build and own castles and allowed the barons and the prelates to erect stone fortresses after the Mongol invasion. Nevertheless, Conrad definitely built his seat by the end of Béla's reign.

However, soon, Conrad turned against Béla IV, according to the above-mentioned royal charter issued in 1263, which suggests he defected to Ottokar II of Bohemia, after his army vanquished the Hungarian troops in the Battle of Kressenbrunn on 12 June 1260. The document narrates Conrad invited and garrisoned Ottokar's Styrian soldiers in his fort at Óvár, and made plundering raids against the nearby villages and estates in Moson County. At the same time, Ottokar issued a safe conduct to Conrad's lands at the border in order to avoid plunder and destruction during the war between the kingdoms. Béla IV also accused his former loyal partisan of coin counterfeiting, which was considered one of the worst sins in medieval Europe. As the charter alleged Conrad fled Béla's realm from being held accountable and joined the court of Duke Stephen. After that Béla confiscated Conrad's landholdings in Moson and Pozsony counties, in addition to the Óvár Castle and the patronage of the Lébény monastery. A large portion of his lands, including the fort itself was granted Lawrence Aba, a staunch supporter of Béla. Duke Stephen's relationship with his father Béla IV deteriorated in the early 1260s. After a brief clash between them in 1262, they concluded a treaty around 25 November, when divided the country and Stephen received the lands to the east of the Danube. In accordance with the treaty, Conrad, among other noblemen, received amnesty from the king, who also returned the confiscated lands to him in early 1263.

The king returned the estate Fertőfő-Szombathely to Conrad in 1267, while the Lébény monastery regained the villages Régen and Sásony (present-day Winden am See, Austria) in the same time. Before 1270, Béla IV has authorized him the collection of duties at the bridge, where the Leitha flowed into the Moson arm of the Danube west of Szigetköz near his fortress. After Stephen V succeeded his father in 1270, he confirmed the received privilege on 1 October, along with other estates in Moson County. When Ottokar invaded the lands north of the Danube in April 1271 and captured a number of fortresses, and routed the Hungarian army at Moson on 15 May, his troops devastated its fortress. Following that Stephen relocated the capital of Moson County to Conrad's seat Óvár Castle. After Stephen's sudden death in August 1272, the minor Ladislaus IV succeeded him as king. His reign marked the beginning of the era of "feudal anarchy", when many groupings of barons fought against each other for supreme power. Under such circumstances, Conrad had numerous conflicts and lawsuits with his neighbors and opponents, for instance the nobles of Kiliti (1274), Paul Gutkeled (1276), Peter Tétény and his family (1278–1279) and his toughest local enemy Herbord Hahót (1279), who looted and plundered his landholdings. His estate of Novák was seized by Ivan Kőszegi, a notorious lord, and unlawfully owned the property until his death.

== Decline ==
Ladislaus IV, who was declared to be of age in 1277, granted half of the royal customs of Moson to Conrad in 1282, while the Székesfehérvár Chapter possessed the other half. Ladislaus also ordered to register Conrad as the lawful owner of Novák estate in 1284. However these measures proved to be only virtual supports for Conrad, as the advancing Kőszegi family gradually displaced him from the region. Conrad's lands laid in the boundaries of interests of the two most powerful and aggressive oligarchic provinces – the Kőszegis seized his villages one after another in Moson County by the mid-1280s and handed over them to their familiares, the Héderváris, while Matthew Csák expelled him from Pozsony County. It is possible that Conrad refused to join the allegiance of Ivan Kőszegi, and Conrad was under pressure in Győr and Moson counties since the mid-1270s. Conrad and his family receded to their lands in Baranya County. There, he already possessed Kopács (today Kopačevo, Croatia), which he was granted by Stephen V in 1271. In Baranya County, Conrad built his new seat in Kéménd (today Máriakéménd) by the early 1290s. Conrad integrated into the local nobility, his all previous connections to Northwest Hungary had been lost. He was mentioned as a noble judge (Hungarian: szolgabíró; lit. "servants' judge") of Baranya County in 1282, alongside three other noblemen.

In 1295, Conrad Győr founded a Pauline monastery at Gyula (present-day Belvárdgyula), dedicated to Saint Ladislaus of Hungary. He donated his three villages of Olasz, Hásságy (Szentága) and Hidor (today part of Olasz) to the newly established abbey. This is the third earliest known privately founded Pauline monastery. However the Győr kindred was embroiled in conflict with the influential local families, the Matucsinais (Kemény, son of Lawrence) and the Kórógyis, who plundered and seized their several lands in Baranya County in 1296, including Kéménd, Gyula, Olasz and Palkonya. Conrad and his son James were granted exemption from the jurisdiction of the ispán by Andrew III of Hungary, but in reality this did not prevail due to the anarchic conditions. In 1298, Conrad and James were mentioned among the many patrons of the Zselicszentjakab Abbey. Conrad last appeared in contemporary records in 1299. He died by 11 November 1302, at approximately 80 years of age.

== Sources ==
- C. Tóth, Norbert (2001). "A Győr-nemzetség az Árpád-korban [The Győr Kindred in the Age of Árpáds]". In Neumann, Tibor (ed.). Analecta Mediaevalia I. Tanulmányok a középkorról (in Hungarian). Argumentum Kiadó. pp. 53–72. ISBN 963-446-174-3.
- Engel, Pál (1996). Magyarország világi archontológiája, 1301–1457, I. [Secular Archontology of Hungary, 1301–1457, Volume I] (in Hungarian). História, MTA Történettudományi Intézete. ISBN 963-8312-44-0.
- Varga, Virág (2019). "A Győr nemzetség az oligarchia időszakában [The Győr Kindred during the Era of Oligarchy]". Első Század (in Hungarian). 20 (Autumn): 79–101. ISSN 2063-5737.
- Zsoldos, Attila (2011). Magyarország világi archontológiája, 1000–1301 [Secular Archontology of Hungary, 1000–1301] (in Hungarian). História, MTA Történettudományi Intézete. ISBN 978-963-9627-38-3.

Conrad I Genus Győr Born: c. 1219 Died: 1299/1302
Political offices
Preceded by Baldwin Rátót	Master of the cupbearers c. 1254–1260	Succeeded by Philip Kórógyi
