= Alexander Győr =

Hungarian noble

Ispán of Moson
- Reign: 1207
- Predecessor: Pat Győr
- Successor: Pat Győr
- Died: 1207
- Noble family: gens Győr
- Father: Stephen I

Alexander from the kindred Győr (Hungarian: Győr nembeli Sándor; died 1207) was a Hungarian noble at the turn of the 12th and 13th centuries, who served as ispán of Moson County for a short time.

== Life ==
Alexander was born into the Óvár branch of the gens (clan) Győr of German origin, as one of the five sons of Stephen I. His brothers were ban Maurus; prelate and chancellor Saul, Bishop of Csanád, then Archbishop of Kalocsa; Csépán, a powerful baron and Palatine of Hungary and Pat, who also held that position.

A contemporary document preserved his nickname "Kubech". Sometimes after 1199, the Győr brothers founded a Benedictine monastery in their possession seat Lébény, Győr County. There they also built a Romanesque church, dedicated to Apostle James the Greater. Alexander was a faithful soldier of Emeric, King of Hungary. When the royal army invaded Serbia then Bulgaria in 1201 or 1202, Alexander participated in the skirmish against Gubasel, who was possibly a Cuman chieftain of Bulgarian tsar Kaloyan. For his service, he was granted the estates of Bán (present-day Bánovce nad Bebravou, Slovakia) and Sásony (present-day Winden am See, Austria) by Emeric. Alexander donated both lands to the Lébény Abbey thereafter. He served as ispán of Moson County in 1207, but died soon, as his brother Pat succeeded him in that year. When King Andrew II confirmed the Győr brothers' donations to the Lébény Abbey in 1208, Alexander was already referred to as a deceased person.

== Sources ==
- C. Tóth, Norbert (2001). "A Győr-nemzetség az Árpád-korban [The Győr Kindred in the Age of Árpáds]". In Neumann, Tibor (ed.). Analecta Mediaevalia I. Tanulmányok a középkorról (in Hungarian). Argumentum Kiadó. p. 53–72. ISBN 963-446-174-3.
- Zsoldos, Attila (2011). Magyarország világi archontológiája, 1000–1301 [Secular Archontology of Hungary, 1000–1301] (in Hungarian). História, MTA Történettudományi Intézete. ISBN 978-963-9627-38-3.

Alexander Genus Győr Born: ? Died: 1207
Political offices
Preceded by Pat Győr	Ispán of Moson; 1207	Succeeded by Pat Győr
