= Csépán Győr =

Hungarian lord

Csépán (I) Győr

Palatine of Hungary
- Reign: 1206–1209
- Predecessor: Mog
- Successor: Pat Győr
- Died: 1209
- Noble family: gens Győr
- Issue: Csépán II
- Father: Stephen I

Csépán (I) from the kindred Győr (Hungarian: Győr nembeli (I.) Csépán; died 1209) was a Hungarian influential lord at the turn of the 12th and 13th centuries, who served as Palatine of Hungary from 1206 until his murder.

== Career ==
His forename was the old Hungarian equivalent of Slavic origin of the name Stephen. Csépán was born into the Óvár branch of the gens (clan) Győr of German roots, as one of the five sons of Stephen. His brothers were prelate and chancellor Saul, Bishop of Csanád, then Archbishop of Kalocsa; Maurus, Ban of Primorje, who was the ancestor of the Gyulai and Geszti noble families; Alexander, who participated in King Emeric's Wars in the Balkans; and Pat, also a powerful baron and Palatine. Csépán had a namesake son from his unidentified wife, who married the daughter of Demetrius Csák.

Sometimes after 1199, the brothers founded a Benedictine monastery in their possession seat Lébény, Győr County. There they also built a Romanesque church, dedicated to Apostle James the Greater. King Andrew II confirmed their donation in 1208 (Saul, Maurus and Alexander were deceased by then).

Csépán is first mentioned by contemporary records in 1199, when he functioned as ispán of Sopron County. He held the dignity until 1200, when he was replaced by Peter, son of Töre. Csépán remained a loyal supporter of Emeric, whose whole reign was characterized by his struggles against his rebellious younger brother, Duke Andrew. He again served as ispán of Sopron County from 1202 to 1204, until Emeric's death. Csépán retained his political influence after the coronation of Andrew II in 1205. Most of Emeric's former officials could retain their offices, because Andrew needed their assistance. Soon, Csépán was appointed ispán of Bács County in 1205. He elevated to the highest court position, the Palatine of Hungary in 1206. Beside that he retained his office of ispán of Bács County, holding both positions until his death. For his service, he was granted two royal lands in Moson County: Szombathely and its customs duties and Balogd by Andrew II in 1209, not long before his assassination. Csépán also owned some lands along the river Sava in Požega County, which he donated to the Knights Templar. Along with his brother Pat, he also donated lands and amounts to the Zselicszentjakab Abbey.

== Murder ==
A document from 1216 narrates that Hungarian noble Tiba Tomaj murdered Csépán Győr in 1209. The victim's brother Pat, who also succeeded him as Palatine, summoned the suspected perpetrator "before the king's presence", but, instead, Tiba fled the Kingdom of Hungary. After his conduct, the court considered the allegations justified, and he was convicted and sentenced to death in absentia by Andrew II and his fellow appointed judges. Pat was granted the confiscated lands of Tiba as a compensation shortly thereafter.

The motivation of the murder is unclear; historian Erik Fügedi considered it as the "first documented political assassination" in Hungary. Bálint Hóman assumed a connection between Csépán's murder and a failed conspiracy against Andrew in the same year, when a group of discontented Hungarian lords offered the crown to Andrew's cousins, the sons of Andrew's uncle, Géza. Historian Attila Zsoldos also emphasizes the possibility of political motivation. Majority of the historians see in Csépán's murder as an prefiguration to the assassination of Andrew's consort Queen Gertrude in 1213. Andrew II introduced a new policy for royal grants, which he called "new institutions", of which one of the main beneficiaries was the Győr kindred. In addition, the king's generosity towards his wife's German relatives and courtiers discontented the local lords. Historian Pál Szabó analyzed the verdict's narrative and political circumstances (only a single private law document mentions the felony), and considered Csépán was killed for personal reasons.

== Sources ==
- C. Tóth, Norbert (2001). "A Győr-nemzetség az Árpád-korban [The Győr Kindred in the Age of Árpáds]". In Neumann, Tibor (ed.). Analecta Mediaevalia I. Tanulmányok a középkorról (in Hungarian). Argumentum Kiadó. pp. 53–72. ISBN 963-446-174-3.
- Markó, László (2006). A magyar állam főméltóságai Szent Istvántól napjainkig: Életrajzi Lexikon [Great Officers of State in Hungary from King Saint Stephen to Our Days: A Biographical Encyclopedia] (in Hungarian). Helikon Kiadó. ISBN 963-208-970-7.
- Szabó, Pál (2009). "Merénylet a merénylet árnyékában? Megjegyzések Csépán nádor halálához (1209) [An Assassination in the Shadow of an Assassination? Remarks on the Death of Palatine Csépán (1209)]". In Kovács, Csongor; Székely, Ilona; Székely, Tünde (eds.). X. RODOSz Konferencia-kötet: társadalomtudományok (in Hungarian). Romániai Magyar Doktorandusok és Fiatal Kutatók Szövetsége. pp. 380–391. ISBN 978-973-8897-08-3.
- Szőcs, Tibor (2014). A nádori intézmény korai története, 1000–1342 [An Early History of the Palatinal Institution: 1000–1342] (in Hungarian). Magyar Tudományos Akadémia Támogatott Kutatások Irodája. ISBN 978-963-508-697-9.
- Zsoldos, Attila (2011). Magyarország világi archontológiája, 1000–1301 [Secular Archontology of Hungary, 1000–1301] (in Hungarian). História, MTA Történettudományi Intézete. ISBN 978-963-9627-38-3.

Csépán I Genus Győr Born: ? Died: 1209
Political offices
| Preceded by Mog | Palatine of Hungary; 1206–1209 | Succeeded by Pat Győr |
