= Pat Győr =

Hungarian lord

Pat (I) Győr

Palatine of Hungary
- Reign: 1209–1212
- Predecessor: Csépán Győr
- Successor: Bánk Bár-Kalán
- Died: after 1221
- Noble family: gens Győr
- Issue: Pat II; Elizabeth
- Father: Stephen I

Pat (I) from the kindred Győr (Hungarian: Győr nembeli (I.) Pat; died after 1221) was a Hungarian influential lord at the turn of the 12th and 13th centuries, who served as Palatine of Hungary from 1209 until 1212.

== Family ==
Pat (also Pot or Poth) was born into the Óvár branch of the gens (clan) Győr of German origin, as one of the five sons of Stephen. His brothers were prelate and chancellor Saul, Bishop of Csanád, then Archbishop of Kalocsa; Maurus, Ban of Primorje, who was the ancestor of the Gyulai and Geszti noble families; Alexander, who participated in King Emeric's Wars in the Balkans; and Csépán, also a powerful baron and Palatine.

Pat had two children from his unidentified wife; his namesake son is mentioned by contemporary records in the period between 1221 and 1233. He had two unidentified daughters, who became the wives of barons Paul Geregye and Stephen Csák, respectively. Pat the Elder also had a daughter Elizabeth, who married Pousa Bár-Kalán.

== Career ==
Pat is first mentioned by contemporary records in 1199, when he served as ispán of Moson County. According to non-authentic charters, he still held the dignity in the years 1201 and 1202, when he was replaced by his sibling Maurus. Both Pat and Csépán were considered loyal supporters of Emeric, whose whole reign was characterized by his struggles against his rebellious younger brother, Duke Andrew. Sometimes after 1199, the Győr brothers founded a Benedictine monastery in their possession seat Lébény, Győr County. There they also built a Romanesque church, dedicated to Apostle James the Greater.

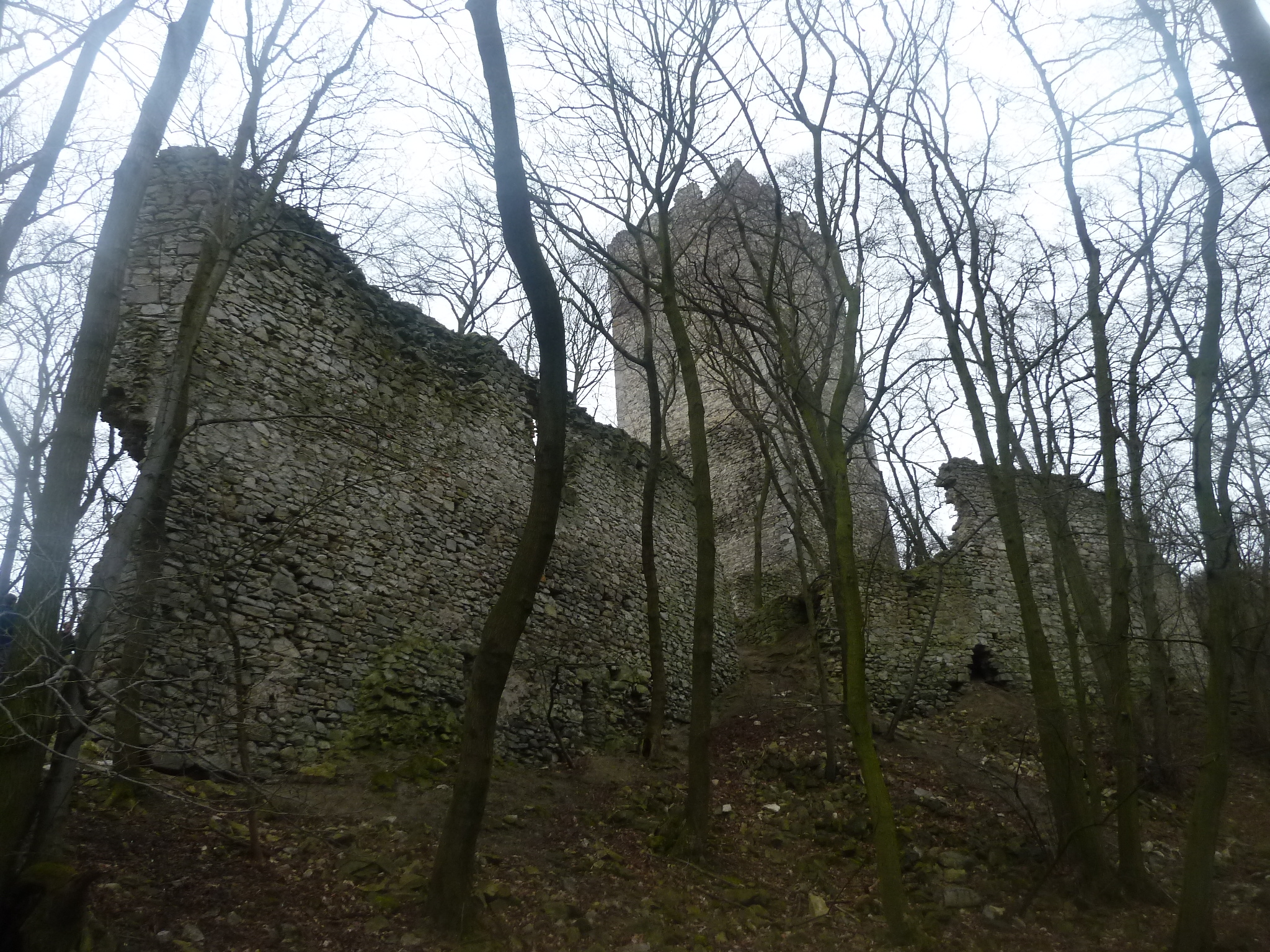
The ruins of Pottenburg Castle in Lower Austria

Pat next appears in documents in 1203, when he functioned as ispán of Temes County. Alongside his brother Csépán and other pro-Emeric lords, Pat was able to retain his political influence after the coronation of Andrew II in 1205, because Andrew needed their assistance. By 1206, Pat again served as ispán of Moson County. He was replaced by his brother Alexander in the next year. Pat elevated to the position of ispán of Pozsony County (an important royal dignity) thereafter, holding the office between around 1207 and 1208. During his service, he built Pottenburg (lit. "Pat's castle), today in ruins located in Hundsheimer Berge (Lower Austria) next to the Devín Gate. In 1207, Pat was appointed ispán of Moson County for the third time.

When Andrew II introduced a new policy for royal grants, which he called "new institutions", one of its main beneficiaries was the Győr kindred. For instance, Pat was granted the village of Hof (Chof) in Moson County by the king in 1208, for his "fidelity" and "tireless strength of probity". King Andrew II also confirmed the Győr brothers' donations to the Lébény Abbey in the same year (Saul, Maurus and Alexander were deceased by then).

A document from 1216 narrates that Tiba Tomaj murdered his brother Palatine Csépán Győr in 1209. Pat, who also succeeded him as palatine, summoned the suspected perpetrator "before the king's presence", but, instead, Tiba fled the Kingdom of Hungary. After his conduct, the court considered the allegations justified, and he was convicted and sentenced to death in absentia by Andrew II and his fellow appointed judges. Pat was granted the confiscated lands of Tiba in Zala County, including Lesencetomaj as a compensation shortly thereafter. Pat sold the estate to Atyusz III Atyusz, who himself sold it to Tiba's relative Peter in 1216.

Pat retained his ispánate of Moson County, when he was appointed palatine in 1209. Serving in this capacity, Pat resided in the royal court on a permanent basis. In 1211, Andrew II commissioned him and chancellor Thomas to record the privileges of the subjects of the Tihany Abbey before its final confirmation. When a group of boyars, who were alarmed by the despotic acts of Vladimir Igorevich, asked Andrew to restore Daniel Romanovich as ruler of Galicia in 1210 or 1211, the king instructed Pat to lead a royal army to Galicia. Under his command, the Hungarian troops defeated Vladimir and restored Daniel Romanovich. For his military successes, he was granted the marsh of Kopács (present-day Kopačevo, Croatia) and its surrounding three fishponds in Baranya County. The king also donated royal lands in Győr and Moson counties to his palatine.

He was replaced as palatine by Bánk Bár-Kalán in 1212. Following that Pat freed his servant Joachim and his family in the Lébény monastery and went on a pilgrimage to Rome. He was referred to as ispán of Keve County in 1213. Pat again served as ispán of Moson County for the fourth time from 1214 to 1215. As Pat never held court positions thereafter, historian Attila Zsoldos considers, he was a leading figure of a group of influential noblemen who was plotting to dethrone Andrew and crown his eldest son, the eight-year-old Béla, but they failed to dethrone him and could only force Andrew to consent to Béla's coronation in 1214. Since members of the kindred's next generation never gained such influence as their fathers, therefore Zsoldos argues that Pat, the last living son of Stephen I, has finally become disgraced for his participation in the 1214 coup attempt. Zsoldos emphasizes Pat's son-in-law Pousa Bár-Kalán functioned as Judge royal in 1222, when his pro-Emeric baronial group forced Andrew II to issue the Golden Bull of 1222. Pat was mentioned as a pristaldus (royal commissioner or "bailiff") during a lawsuit in 1217. He died after 1221.

== Sources ==
- C. Tóth, Norbert (2001). "A Győr-nemzetség az Árpád-korban [The Győr Kindred in the Age of Árpáds]". In Neumann, Tibor (ed.). Analecta Mediaevalia I. Tanulmányok a középkorról (in Hungarian). Argumentum Kiadó. p. 53–72. ISBN 963-446-174-3.
- Markó, László (2006). A magyar állam főméltóságai Szent Istvántól napjainkig: Életrajzi Lexikon [Great Officers of State in Hungary from King Saint Stephen to Our Days: A Biographical Encyclopedia] (in Hungarian). Helikon Kiadó. ISBN 963-208-970-7.
- Szabó, Pál (2009). "Merénylet a merénylet árnyékában? Megjegyzések Csépán nádor halálához (1209) [An Assassination in the Shadow of an Assassination? Remarks on the Death of Palatine Csépán (1209)]". In Kovács, Csongor; Székely, Ilona; Székely, Tünde (eds.). X. RODOSz Konferencia-kötet: társadalomtudományok (in Hungarian). Romániai Magyar Doktorandusok és Fiatal Kutatók Szövetsége. p. 380–391. ISBN 978-973-8897-08-3.
- Szőcs, Tibor (2014). A nádori intézmény korai története, 1000–1342 [An Early History of the Palatinal Institution: 1000–1342] (in Hungarian). Magyar Tudományos Akadémia Támogatott Kutatások Irodája. ISBN 978-963-508-697-9.
- Zsoldos, Attila (2011a). Magyarország világi archontológiája, 1000–1301 [Secular Archontology of Hungary, 1000–1301] (in Hungarian). História, MTA Történettudományi Intézete. ISBN 978-963-9627-38-3.
- Zsoldos, Attila (2011b). "II. András Aranybullája [Andrew II's Golden Bull]". Történelmi Szemle (in Hungarian). LIII (1): 1–38. ISSN 0040-9634.

Pat I Genus Győr Born: ? Died: after 1221
Political offices
Preceded by Csépán Győr	Palatine of Hungary; 1209–1212	Succeeded by Bánk Bár-Kalán
