= Saul Győr =

Hungarian prelate

- Archbishop of Kalocsa
- Installed: 1192
- Term ended: 1202
- Predecessor: Peter
- Successor: John
- Other post: Bishop of Csanád

Personal details
- Died: early 1202
- Denomination: Roman Catholic
- Parents: Stephen I Győr

Saul from the kindred Győr (Hungarian: Győr nembeli Saul; died early 1202) was a prelate in the Kingdom of Hungary at the turn of the 12th and 13th centuries. He was Bishop of Csanád (now Cenad in Romania) between 1188 and 1192, then Archbishop of Kalocsa from 1192 until his death.

== Early life ==
Saul was born into the Óvár branch of the gens (clan) Győr of German origin, as one of the five sons of Stephen I. His brothers were Maurus, Ban of Primorje, who was the ancestor of the Gyulai, Geszti and Kéméndi noble families; Alexander, who participated in King Emeric's Wars in the Balkans; Csépán, a powerful baron and Palatine of Hungary and Pat, who also held that position.

In his youth, Saul belonged to the court clergy and was a member of the royal chapel during the reign of Béla III of Hungary. He first appeared in contemporary records in 1183, when he was referred to as a royal chief notary. In this capacity, he formulated that royal diploma, which contained a grant of privilege for the Archdiocese of Split. However, in the same year, Saul was also styled as "chancellor" by two dubious documents; the first one is a donation letter, which was issued by the Cistercians, where Saul appeared as a witness; while the second charter was an official royal document. Saul bore the title "protonotarius", which emphasised the establishment of a separate Royal Chancery during Béla's reign. Saul's title suggests there were other notaries during that time. It is also presumable that the title reflects the royal chapel's restoration attempts following the dismissal of chancellor Kalán Bár-Kalán. The above-mentioned donation letter was formulated by Saul, while Redabanus, the head of the royal chapel used the royal seal to authenticate it; for the last time in the Hungarian institutional history. Thus "chancellor" Saul had more limited powers than his predecessor Kalán, and his appointment was a short-lived attempt to restore the pre-1181 institutional situation by the court clergy.

He was appointed chancellor by 1188. In the same time, he already functioned as Bishop-elect of Csanád, but his episcopate was mentioned by only non-authentic charters. Nevertheless, it is certain that the dignity has been filled by him in the period between 1188 and 1192 (when his successor Crispin already appeared in the sources and Saul himself was archbishop). One of the non-authentic charters from 1190 also refers to Saul as bishop; as the positions of his contemporaries, who also appear in the document, can be verified, thus the forgery was compiled by the usage of an authentic document. Historian Norbert C. Tóth questions that Saul ever held both offices, while András Kubinyi argued the charter's corroboratio is authentic. Kálmán Juhász argued Saul functioned as chancellor until his confirmation as bishop in the same year (1188).

== Archbishop ==
Saul Győr became Archbishop of Kalocsa in 1192, following the death of his predecessor Peter. The archdiocese suffered serious damage and material loss because of the continuous wars and clashes between the Kingdom of Hungary and the Byzantine Empire in the second half of the 12th century. He was the first archbishop who moved his seat from Bács (today Bač, Serbia) to Kalocsa for the first time since the episcopate of Fabian (r. around 1090). To ensure its prestige and financially establish smooth operation, he transferred the tithe and ship taxes of numerous surrounding villages (for instance, Somos, Okor, Kamarás and Megyer) to the local chapter. Pope Innocent III confirmed the donations in June 1198. In the same letter, the pope authorised Saul to expel the monks of Abraham of the Valley of Hebron from the Kő monastery because of their undisciplined and immoral behaviour, and to return it to the Benedictine Order. After verification that the Benedictines have been unable to return, Saul intended to populate the abandoned monastery with Augustinians. Decades later, Ugrin Csák of Kalocsa established the Diocese of Syrmia there. Saul Győr persuaded the Orthodox-rite Slavic subjects of his diocese to pay the church tax.

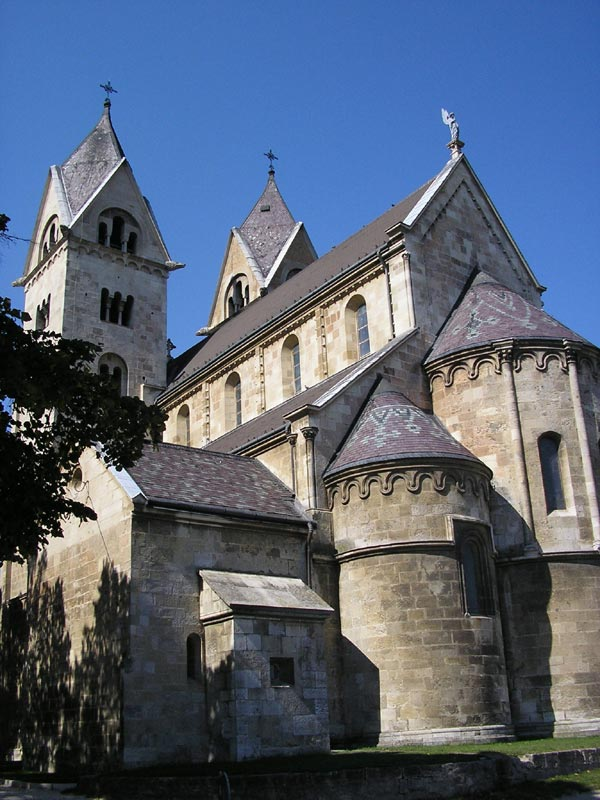
The monastery of Lébény

Béla III died in April 1196. He was succeeded by his elder son Emeric, whose whole reign was characterised by his struggles against his rebellious younger brother, Duke Andrew. In the civil war, Saul Győr supported the king, but not without any reservations. In May 1198, Pope Innocent authorised archbishops Job of Esztergom and Saul of Kalocsa to excommunicate Andrew and his partisans and put their places of residence under interdict if they continue the rebellion against the royal power. On 30 December 1198, the pope ordered Saul, Ugrin Csák of Győr and Dominic of Zagreb to investigate the inauguration of the pro-Andrew archbishops of the Dalmatian dioceses of Split (Spalato) and Zadar (Zára), who were formerly excommunicated by Pope Celestine III, but Andrew arbitrarily appointed them to their dignities. Around the same time, Elvin, Bishop of Várad was accused of simony and act of offence by the local chapter. Some canons appeared in the court of Saul in mid-1197 to request his intervention. Elvin refused to assist the investigation, thus Saul ruled in favour of the chapter and excommunicated Elvin in 1198. As the bishop became a supporter of Andrew, this dissension was a chapter of a wider conflict between the partisans of Emeric and the duke. Thereafter Elvin admitted the offence and asked for the penalty to be suspended from Saul. The archbishop required Elvin's written confession and compulsory pilgrimage to the Roman Curia to exercise penance. After Elvin met the request, Saul lifted the excommunication. King Emeric strongly opposed Saul's decision, but the archbishop wished to keep the secular sphere out of church affairs. When Emeric forced Boleslaus, Bishop of Vác, who was a supporter of Andrew, to give him documents that proved the existence of conspiracy against him, and his army looted the Vác Cathedral in March 1199, Pope Innocent urged Saul to investigate the events and call upon the king to compensation. However, Emeric prevented the visitation of Saul to the royal court (the king claimed he had ordered this for the safety of the archbishop, whose lives would have been endangered by the adherents of the pro-Andrew prelates). Nevertheless, they remained allies in the conflict, Saul had to balance between the king and the Roman Curia.

Sometimes after 1199, the Győr brothers founded a Benedictine monastery in their possession seat Lébény, Győr County. There they also built a Romanesque church, dedicated to Apostle James the Greater. King Andrew II confirmed their donation in 1208 (Saul, Maurus and Alexander were deceased by then). Juhász argued it was the consequence of that Saul, gaining an advantage from his influential position in the royal court, requested Emeric to return the landholding to the kindred, which became a royal property after the death of his father Stephen's cousins Alexander and Seraphin. Saul supported the Heiligenkreuz Abbey with large sums in 1199. Saul also had a (maternal?) relative, a certain knight George, who belonged to the entourage of Constance of Hungary, the spouse of Ottokar I of Bohemia. George erected a church dedicated to Saint George in the village Lhota in Bohemia. In January 1199, Saul permitted indulgence for those, who visited the church. Daniel II, Archbishop of Prague confirmed the privilege in March 1200. Saul was last mentioned by contemporary records in 1201. According to a non-authentic royal charter, he was still alive in early 1202. Soon, John succeeded him as archbishop. His canonization was initiated after his death, but that never happened.

== Legacy ==
The Assumption Cathedral of Kalocsa was extensively restored between 1907 and 1912, under the direction of architect Ernő Foerk. Under the sanctuary, a red marble archiepiscopal tomb was excavated in 1910 in the place of the original 11th-century cathedral. In addition to the intact skeleton, a gilded silver-headed crosier, a silver chalice, paten, golden rings, crosses, pallium with three jewelled gold pins, and textile remnants were found. Foerk estimated the age of the grave and thought its 11th-century origin, identified the corpse with Astrik, the first Archbishop of Kalocsa, as the grave laid in the central axis of the first cathedral, a usual resting place for the church founders. Foerk also analogised the crosier with the near-contemporary pastoral staff of Anno II, Archbishop of Cologne (d. 1075). However Jesuit art historian Joseph Braun analysed the chalice and the textiles based on the pictures sent, but he did not deal with the other objects. Thereafter he dated the grave to the turn of the 12th and 13th centuries. Accordingly, he identified the skeleton as the corpse of archbishops Saul Győr or Ugrin Csák. The diocese's librarian Pál Winkler emphasised that Ugrin was killed in the Battle of Mohi (1241) and his body was never found. Moritz Dreger considered the textiles of Byzantine origin. In 1912, the tombstone was relocated into the new Archbishop's Crypt with the epitaph "OSSA ANONYMI AEPPI COLOCEN. SAEC. XII. / SAULI DE GYŐR /? / 1192–1202 /".

In January–February 2014, the tomb was re-examined during archaeological excavations, which aimed to define the exact age of the skeleton. The identification was supported by the AMS radiocarbon examination that was conducted on the two phalanxes acquired from the skeleton. The result of the Carbon-14 (radiocarbon) examination defined the date of death of the archbishop buried in the grave at (cal AD) 1001–1030, which date coincides with the scanty historical data on Astrik. Accordingly, the skeleton was identified with the corpse of Astrik, and not Saul Győr.

== Sources ==
- Buzás, Gergely (2014). "A kalocsai érseksír azonosítása [Identification of the Archbishop's Tomb in Kalocsa]". Archaeologia – Altum Castrum Online (in Hungarian). MNM Visegrádi Mátyás Király Múzeum: 2–7.
- C. Tóth, Norbert (2001). "A Győr-nemzetség az Árpád-korban [The Győr Kindred in the Age of Árpáds]". In Neumann, Tibor (ed.). Analecta Mediaevalia I. Tanulmányok a középkorról (in Hungarian). Argumentum Kiadó. pp. 53–72. ISBN 963-446-174-3.
- Juhász, Kálmán (1930). A csanádi püspökség története alapításától a tatárjárásig (1030–1242) [The History of the Diocese of Csanád from its Foundation to the Mongol Invasion (1030–1242)] (in Hungarian). Csanádvármegyei Könyvtár 19–20.
- Kubinyi, András (1975). "Királyi kancellária és udvari kápolna Magyarországon a XII. század közepén [Royal Chancery and Court Chapel in Hungary in the Middle of the 12th Century]". Levéltári Közlemények (in Hungarian). 46 (1). National Archives of Hungary: 59–121. ISSN 0024-1512.
- Markó, László (2006). A magyar állam főméltóságai Szent Istvántól napjainkig: Életrajzi Lexikon [Great Officers of State in Hungary from King Saint Stephen to Our Days: A Biographical Encyclopedia] (in Hungarian). Helikon Kiadó. ISBN 963-208-970-7.
- Szabados, György (1999). "Imre és András [Emeric and Andrew]". Századok (in Hungarian). 133 (1). Magyar Történelmi Társulat: 85–111. ISSN 0039-8098.
- Udvardy, József (1991). A kalocsai érsekek életrajza (1000–1526) [Biographies of Archbishops of Kalocsa, 1000–1526] (in Hungarian). Görres Gesellschaft.
- Zsoldos, Attila (2011). Magyarország világi archontológiája, 1000–1301 [Secular Archontology of Hungary, 1000–1301] (in Hungarian). História, MTA Történettudományi Intézete. ISBN 978-963-9627-38-3.

Saul Genus Győr Born: ? Died: 1202
Political offices
Preceded by Adrian	Chancellor; 1188	Succeeded by Katapán
Catholic Church titles
Preceded by Stephen (?)	Bishop of Csanád; 1188–1192	Succeeded by Crispin
Preceded by Peter	Archbishop of Kalocsa; 1192–1202	Succeeded by John
