= Maurus Győr =

Hungarian noble

Maurus (I) Győr

Ban of Primorje
- Reign: c. 1181
- Predecessor: first known
- Successor: Damian
- Died: 1203/08
- Noble family: gens Győr
- Issue: Stephen II; George
- Father: Stephen I

Maurus (I) from the kindred Győr (Hungarian: Győr nembeli (I.) Mór; died between 1203 and 1208) was a Hungarian noble at the turn of the 12th and 13th centuries, who served as the first known banus maritimus, a predecessor office to the dignity of Ban of Croatia in the Kingdom of Hungary.

== Family ==
Maurus was born into the Óvár branch of the gens (clan) Győr of German origin, as one of the five sons of Stephen I. His brothers were prelate and chancellor Saul, Bishop of Csanád, then Archbishop of Kalocsa; Alexander, who participated in King Emeric's Wars in the Balkans; Csépán, a powerful baron and Palatine of Hungary and Pat, who also held that position.

Possibly Maurus was the eldest one of his brothers, as his elder son Stephen II was adult by the early 1200s. Through Stephen, Maurus was the ancestor of the Gyulai, Geszti and Kéméndi noble families.

== Career ==
Maurus is first referred by contemporary records in February 1181, when resided in Zadar and was involved in a verdict about some possession rights. After the Hungarians had restored their suzerainty in Dalmatia against the Byzantine Empire, taking advantage of Emperor Manuel's death, at the turn of 1180 and 1181, Maurus was installed as "governor of the whole coastal province". Consequently, he is identical with that Maurus, who held the position of Ban of Primorje around 1181. He is the first known office-holder of that dignity, which a precursor office of the royal dignity of Ban of Croatia, which elevated as an equal position to the dignity Ban of Slavonia in 1275. Accordingly, Maurus functioned as the deputy of Denis, Ban of Slavonia in proper Croatia, which fact is reflected by his full title in Latin: "comes et tocius maritime provincie studiosus exercitator" (Hungarian: tengermelléki bán). He served in this capacity until 1188 at the last, when a certain comes Damian of Zadar bore the title.

Maurus next appears in contemporary documents as a witness, when Béla III of Hungary recorded and confirmed the estates and properties of the Székesfehérvár Convent in 1193. Maurus served as ispán of Moson County from 1202 to 1203, replacing his brother Pat. In this capacity, he acted as a pristaldus (royal commissioner or "bailiff") during the determination of the borders of the Szentkereszt Abbey. Maurus owned lands near Besenyő in Somogy County. He died by 1208, when Andrew II of Hungary confirmed the Győr kindred's donation to the Lébény monastery in Győr County.

== Sources ==
- C. Tóth, Norbert (2001). "A Győr-nemzetség az Árpád-korban [The Győr Kindred in the Age of Árpáds]". In Neumann, Tibor (ed.). Analecta Mediaevalia I. Tanulmányok a középkorról (in Hungarian). Argumentum Kiadó. pp. 53–72. ISBN 963-446-174-3.
- Makk, Ferenc (1989). The Árpáds and the Comneni: Political Relations between Hungary and Byzantium in the 12th century (Translated by György Novák). Akadémiai Kiadó. ISBN 963-05-5268-X.
- Markó, László (2006). A magyar állam főméltóságai Szent Istvántól napjainkig: Életrajzi Lexikon [Great Officers of State in Hungary from King Saint Stephen to Our Days: A Biographical Encyclopedia] (in Hungarian). Helikon Kiadó. ISBN 963-208-970-7.
- Zsoldos, Attila (2011). Magyarország világi archontológiája, 1000–1301 [Secular Archontology of Hungary, 1000–1301] (in Hungarian). História, MTA Történettudományi Intézete. ISBN 978-963-9627-38-3.

Maurus I Genus Győr Born: ? Died: 1203/08
Political offices
Preceded by first known	Ban of Primorje c. 1181	Succeeded by Damian
