= Baloň =

Baloň Balony
- Municipality
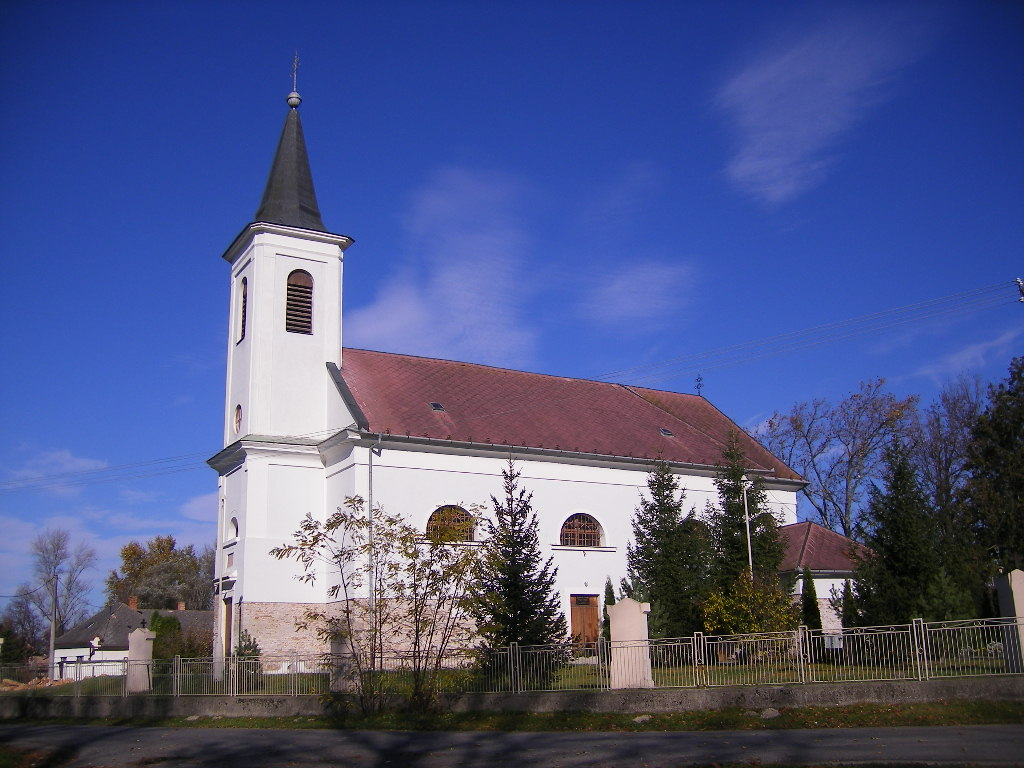

- Flag Coat of arms

- Location of Baloň in the Trnava Region Location of Baloň in Slovakia
- Coordinates: 47.83°N 17.67°E
- Country: Slovakia
- Region: Trnava Region
- District: Dunajská Streda District
- First mentioned: 1252

Government
  - Mayor: Frigyes Matus (Party of the Hungarian Coalition)

Area
  - Total: 16.07 km^{2} (6.20 sq mi)
- Elevation: 111 m (364 ft)

Population (2025)
  - Total: 721

Ethnicity
  - Hungarians: 94,01%
  - Slovaks: 5,31%
- Time zone: UTC+1 (CET)
  - Summer (DST): UTC+2 (CEST)
- Postal code: 930 08
- Area code: +421 31
- Vehicle registration plate (until 2022): DS
- Website: www.obecbalon.sk

Baloň (Hungarian: Balony, pronounced [ˈbɒloɲ]) is a village and municipality in the Dunajská Streda District in the Trnava Region of south-west Slovakia.

== Geography ==
The municipality lies at an altitude of 111 metres (364 ft) and covers an area of 16.07 km^{2} (6.20 sq mi) (2025).

== History ==
In the late of 9th century, the territory of Baloň became part of the Kingdom of Hungary. In historical records the village was first mentioned in 1252. It was part of Győr County. After the Austro-Hungarian army disintegrated in November 1918, Czechoslovak troops occupied the area, later acknowledged internationally by the Treaty of Trianon. Between 1938 and 1945 Baloň once more became part of Miklós Horthy's Hungary through the First Vienna Award. From 1945 until the Velvet Divorce, it was part of Czechoslovakia. Since then it has been part of Slovakia.

== Population ==
Population statistic (10 years)
Year	1995	2005	2015	2025
Count	733	773	749	721
Difference		+5.45%	−3.10%	−3.73%

Population statistic
Year	2024	2025
Count	722	721
Difference		−0.13%

It has a population of 721 people (31 December 2025).

=== Ethnicity ===
Census 2021 (1+ %)
Ethnicity	Number	Fraction
Hungarian	645	89.58%
Slovak	72	10%
Not found out	31	4.3%
Total	720	

In year 2021 was 720 people by ethnicity 645 as Hungarian, 72 as Slovak, 31 as Not found out, 1 as Czech, 1 as Ukrainian, 1 as Romani and 1 as Rusyn.

Note on population: The difference values of population numbers in the table "Population statistic" and in the sections "Ethnicity" & "Religion" is caused by the use of various statistical methods.

=== Religion ===
Census 2021 (1+ %)
Religion	Number	Fraction
Roman Catholic Church	528	73.33%
None	85	11.81%
Calvinist Church	44	6.11%
Not found out	32	4.44%
Evangelical Church	13	1.81%
Total	720	

In year 2021 was 720 people by religion 528 from Roman Catholic Church, 85 from None, 44 from Calvinist Church, 32 from Not found out, 13 from Evangelical Church, 4 from Jehovah's Witnesses, 4 from Greek Catholic Church, 3 from Christian Congregations in Slovakia, 2 from Old Catholic Church, 2 from Eastern Orthodox Church, 1 from Other and not ascertained christian church, 1 from Buddhism and 1 from Apostolic Church.

== Genealogical resources ==
The records for genealogical research are available at the state archive in Bratislava (Slovak: Štátny archív v Bratislave).

- Roman Catholic church records (births/marriages/deaths): 1734-1898 (parish A)
- Lutheran church records (births/marriages/deaths): ????-???? (parish in Győr, Hungary)
- Reformated church records (births/marriages/deaths): 1810-1902 (parish B)
- Census records 1869 of Balon are not available at the state archive.

== See also ==
- List of municipalities and towns in Slovakia
