= Crispin (bishop of Csanád) =

Hungarian prelate (died after 1193)

- Bishop of Csanád
- Installed: 1192
- Term ended: 1193 or later
- Predecessor: Saul Győr
- Successor: John

Personal details
- Denomination: Roman Catholic

Crispin or Krispin (Hungarian: Köröspény; died after 1193) was a prelate in the Kingdom of Hungary in the late 12th century, who served as Bishop of Csanád (now Cenad in Romania) from 1192 until around 1193/98.

== Career ==
Crispin was elected Bishop of Csanád in 1192, when his predecessor Saul Győr elevated into the position of Archbishop of Kalocsa. He first appeared in this dignity as a signatory of a royal charter in that year, when King Béla III of Hungary donated three duty-free salt-carrying vessels to the Pannonhalma Abbey. Crispin was again referred to as bishop in 1193, when Bartholomew of Krk was granted Modruš by Béla III. This is the last piece of information about Crispin. His earliest known successor John was elected Bishop of Csanád in 1198.

== Sources ==
- Juhász, Kálmán (1930). A csanádi püspökség története alapításától a tatárjárásig (1030–1242) [The History of the Diocese of Csanád from its Foundation to the Mongol Invasion (1030–1242)] (in Hungarian). Csanádvármegyei Könyvtár 19–20.
- Zsoldos, Attila (2011). Magyarország világi archontológiája, 1000–1301 [Secular Archontology of Hungary, 1000–1301] (in Hungarian). História, MTA Történettudományi Intézete. ISBN 978-963-9627-38-3.

Catholic Church titles
Preceded by Saul Győr	Bishop of Csanád; 1192–c. 1193	Succeeded by John
