= Pauline monastery =

Pauline monastery may refer to:

- Monastery of St Lawrence at Buda
- Monastery of Jasna Góra
- Monastery of Sveta Jelena
- Monastery of Kékes
- Pauline Monastery of Márianosztra
- Church of the Assumption of the Blessed Virgin Mary (Crikvenica)
