= Börcs =

- Flag Coat of arms

- Location of Győr-Moson-Sopron county in Hungary

- Location of Börcs
- Coordinates: 47.68677°N 17.49963°E
- Country: Hungary
- County: Győr-Moson-Sopron

Area
  - Total: 12.77 km^{2} (4.93 sq mi)

Population (2004)
  - Total: 1,075
  - Density: 84.18/km^{2} (218.0/sq mi)
- Time zone: UTC+1 (CET)
  - Summer (DST): UTC+2 (CEST)
- Postal code: 9152
- Area code: 96
- Motorways: M1, M85
- Distance from Budapest: 138 km (86 mi) East

Börcs is a village in Győr-Moson-Sopron county, Hungary. As of 2020, the mayor of Börcs was Róbert Rácz, who had held the post for 30 years.

The Börcs Village Sports Association was established in 1954. In 2023, the club held a football tournament in memory of Dominik Szeri, a young player who died in an accident the previous year, as well as its former president István Kleinhoff.
