= Kaposgyarmat =

- Village
- Coat of arms

- Location of Somogy county in Hungary

- Location of Kaposgyarmat
- Coordinates: 46.27992°N 17.88214°E
- Country: Hungary
- Region: Southern Transdanubia
- County: Somogy
- District: Kaposvár
- RC Diocese: Kaposvár

Area
  - Total: 11.07 km^{2} (4.27 sq mi)

Population (2017)
  - Total: 91
  - Density: 8.2/km^{2} (21/sq mi)
- Demonym: kaposgyarmati
- Time zone: UTC+1 (CET)
  - Summer (DST): UTC+2 (CEST)
- Postal code: 7473
- Area code: (+36) 82
- NUTS 3 code: HU232
- MP: Attila Gelencsér (Fidesz)
- Website: Kaposgyarmat Online

Kaposgyarmat is a village in Somogy county, Hungary.
