= Moson County =

County of the Kingdom of Hungary

Moson County Comitatus Mosoniensis (Latin) Moson vármegye (Hungarian) Komitat Wieselburg (German)
- County of the Kingdom of Hungary
- 11th century–1923
- Coat of arms

- Capital: Moson; Magyaróvár (1271-1923)
- Area
  - Coordinates: 47°53′N 17°16′E
  - 1910: 2,013 km^{2} (777 sq mi)
- Population
  - 1910: 94,500
- History
  - Established: 11th century
  - Treaty of Trianon: 4 June 1920
  - Merged into Győr-Moson County: 1923
- Today part of: Austria (979 km^{2}) Hungary (972 km^{2}) Slovakia (62 km^{2})

Moson (German: Wieselburg, Slovak: Mošon) was an administrative county (comitatus) of the Kingdom of Hungary, situated mostly on the right (south) side of the Danube river. Its territory is now divided between Austria and Hungary, except a small area which is part of Slovakia. Moson is also the name of a town, nowadays part of the city Mosonmagyaróvár, Hungary.

== Geography ==
Moson county shared borders with the Austrian land Lower Austria and the Hungarian counties Pozsony, Győr and Sopron. The river Danube runs along the north of the county, and the Lake Neusiedl (Hungarian: Fertő tó) lies partly in the county. Its area was 2013 km^{2} around 1910.

== Capitals ==
The capital of the county was the town of Moson initially. The capital was moved to nearby Magyaróvár in the Middle Ages. Moson and Magyaróvár merged in 1939 to form the city of Mosonmagyaróvár.

== History ==
The Moson comitatus arose as one of the first comitatuses of the Kingdom of Hungary.

In 1920 by the Treaty of Trianon a tiny part of Moson county close to Pressburg (Pozsony, today's Bratislava) became part of newly formed Czechoslovakia. The eastern part stayed in Hungary and merged with Győr county and a very small part of Pozsony county to form Győr-Moson-Pozsony county. The western part became part of the new Austrian land Burgenland (formed in 1921). Three villages – Dunacsún, (Čunovo), Horvátjárfalu (Jarovce), and Oroszvár (Rusovce) – became part of Czechoslovakia.

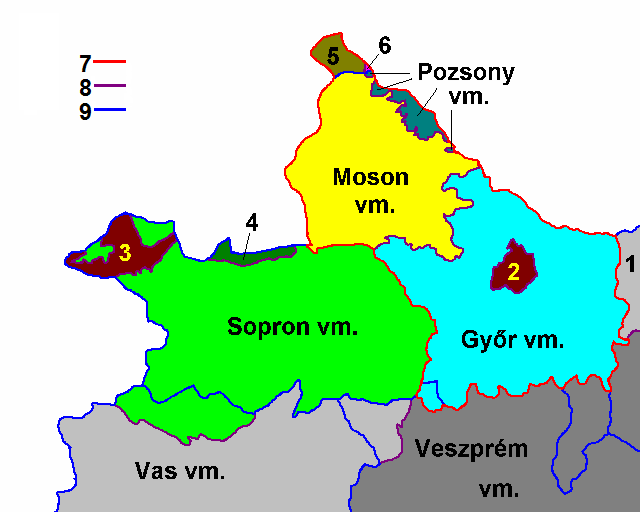
Győr and Moson counties after the Treaty of Trianon. In 1923, the two counties were merged to form Győr-Moson County. The map shows that small part of the former Pozsony County that remained in Hungary. (4) territory assigned from Moson County to Sopron County in 1921. (5) and (6) territory ceded to Czechoslovakia in 1947.

After World War II, Győr-Moson-Pozsony county merged with Sopron County to form Győr-Sopron county. This county was renamed to Győr-Moson-Sopron county in the early 1990s.

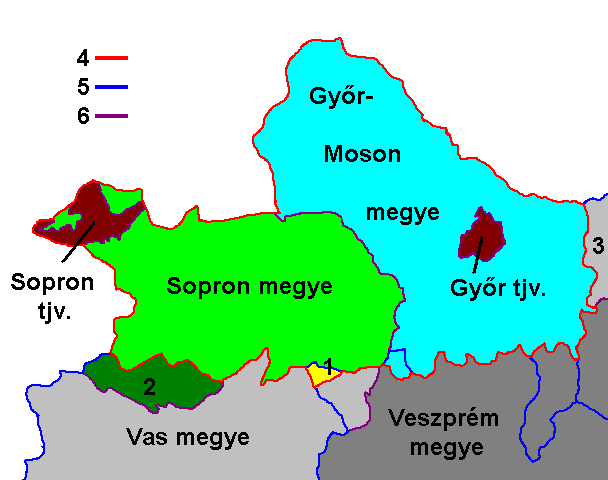
The formation of modern Győr-Moson-Sopron County. (1) territory assigned from Vas County to Győr-Moson-Sopron County in 1950. (2) territory assigned from Sopron County to Vas County in 1950.

== Demographics ==
=== 1900 ===
In 1900, the county had a population of 89,714 people and was composed of the following linguistic communities:

Total:

- German: 54,508 (60.7%)
- Hungarian: 25,991 (29.0%)
- Croatian: 8,017 (8.9%)
- Slovak: 589 (0.7%)
- Romanian: 21 (0.0%)
- Serbian: 3 (0.0%)
- Ruthenian: 1 (0.0%)
- Other or unknown: 584 (0.7%)

According to the census of 1900, the county was composed of the following religious communities:

Total:

- Roman Catholic: 77,934 (86.9%)
- Lutheran: 9,309 (10.4%)
- Jewish: 2,180 (2,4)
- Calvinist: 256 (0.3%)
- Greek Catholic: 19 (0.0%)
- Unitarian: 8 (0.0%)
- Greek Orthodox: 4 (0.0%)
- Other or unknown: 4 (0.0%)

=== 1910 ===
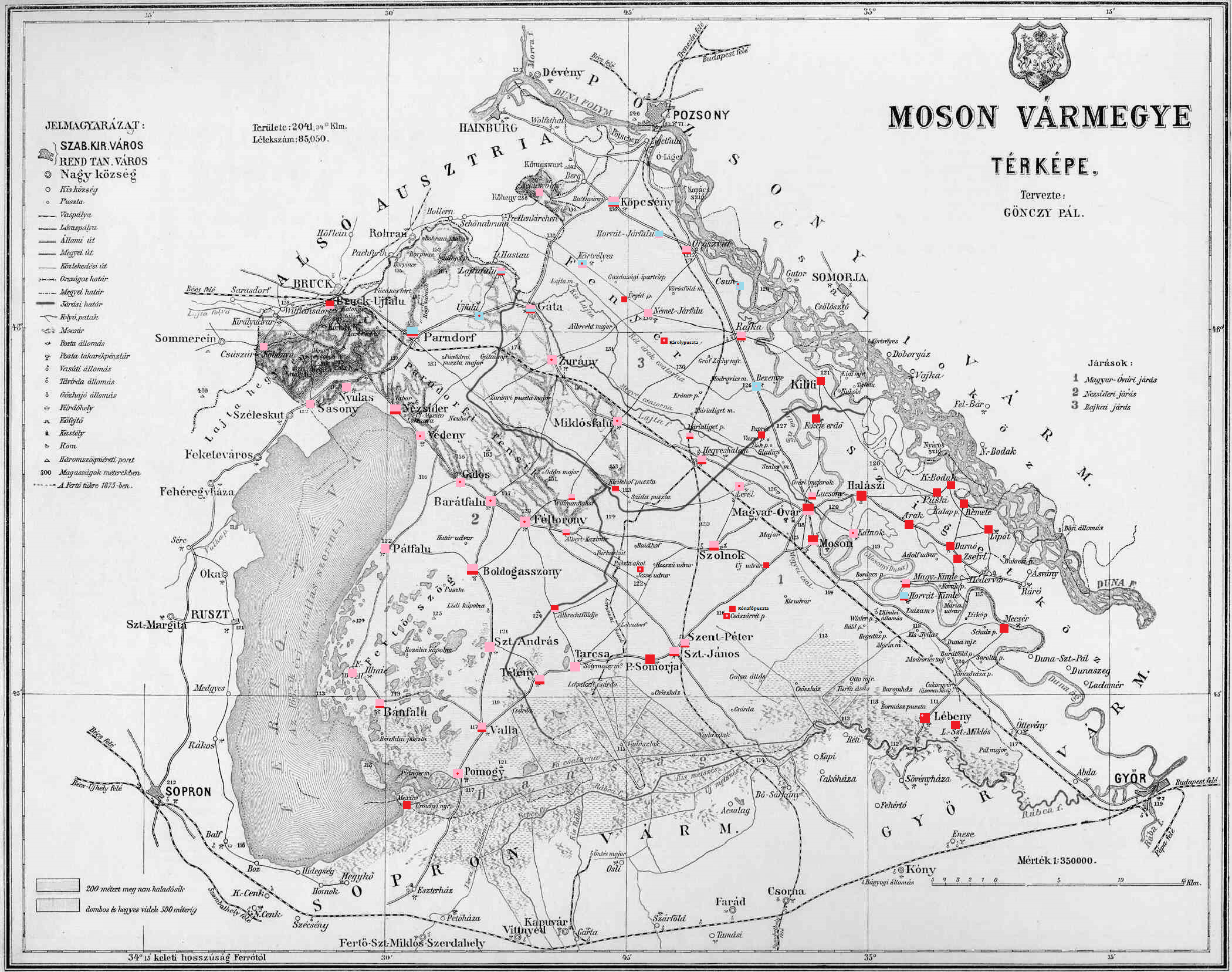
Ethnic map of the county with data of the 1910 census (see the key in the description).

In 1910, the county had a population of 94,479 people and was composed of the following linguistic communities:

Total:

- German: 51,997 (55.0%)
- Hungarian: 33,006 (34.9%)
- Croatian: 8,123 (8.6%)
- Slovak: 735 (0.8%)
- Ruthenian: 7 (0.0%)
- Romanian: 5 (0.0%)
- Serbian: 2 (0.0%)
- Other or unknown: 604 (0.7%)

According to the census of 1910, the county was composed of the following religious communities:

Total:

- Roman Catholic: 82,636 (87.5%)
- Lutheran: 9,551 (10.1%)
- Jewish: 1,881 (2,0)
- Calvinist: 355 (0.4%)
- Greek Catholic: 37 (0.0%)
- Greek Orthodox: 12 (0.0%)
- Unitarian: 5 (0.0%)
- Other or unknown: 2 (0.0%)

== Subdivisions ==
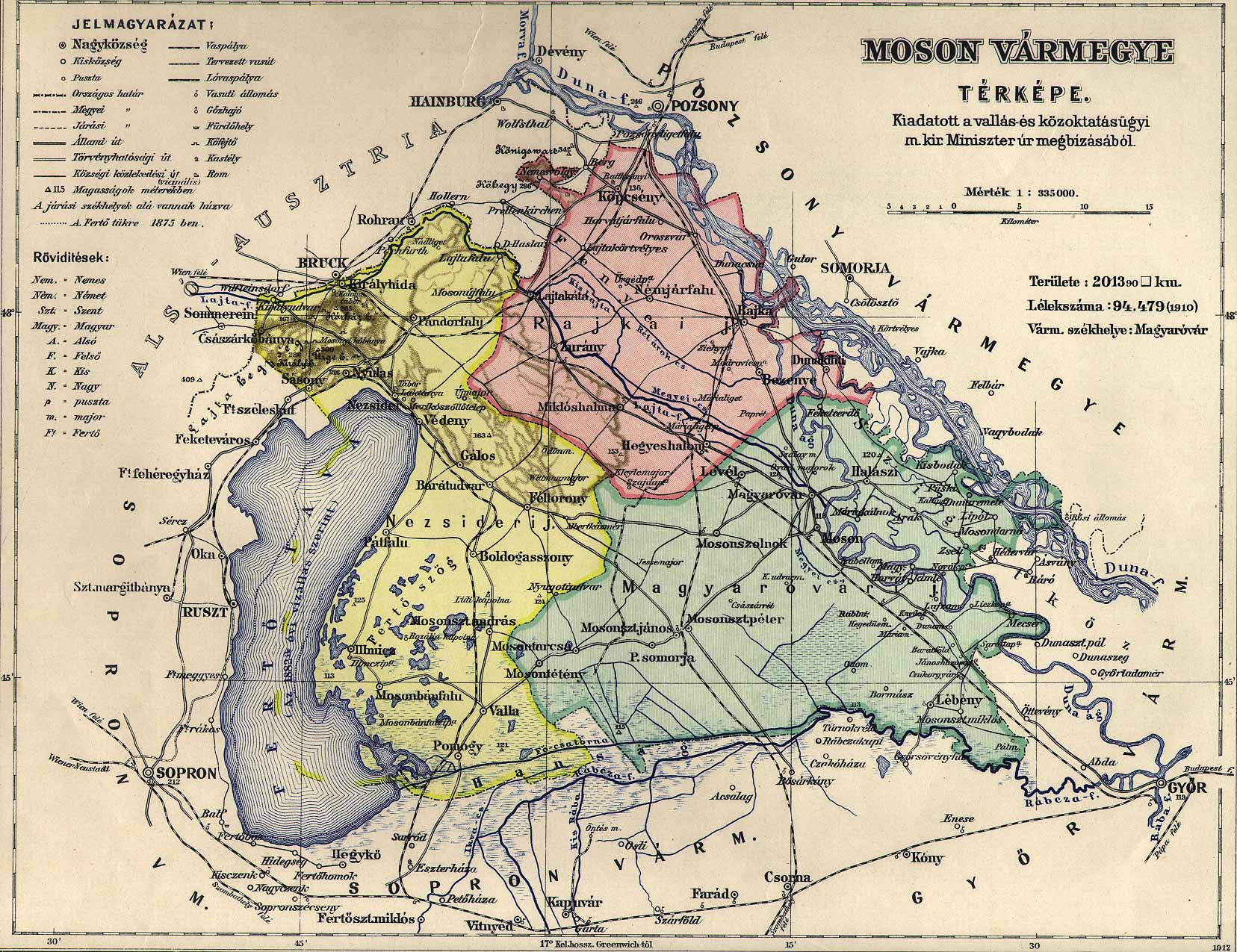

In the early 20th century, the subdivisions of Moson county were:

Districts (járás)
District	Capital
Magyaróvár	Magyaróvár (now Mosonmagyaróvár)
Nezsider	Nezsider, AT Neusiedl am See
Rajka	Rajka

Neusiedl am See is now in Austria.
