= Lébény =

Town in Győr-Moson-Sopron, Hungary

- Town
- Flag Coat of arms

- Location of Győr-Moson-Sopron county in Hungary
- Country: Hungary
- County: Győr-Moson-Sopron
- District: Mosonmagyaróvár

Area
  - Total: 81.36 km^{2} (31.41 sq mi)

Population (2015)
  - Total: 3,232
  - Density: 39.72/km^{2} (102.9/sq mi)
- Time zone: UTC+1 (CET)
  - Summer (DST): UTC+2 (CEST)
- Postal code: 9155
- Area code: (+36) 96
- Motorways: M1
- Distance from Budapest: 145 km (90 mi) East
- Website: lebeny.hu

Lébény (Latin: Quadrata or Stailuco) is a town in Győr-Moson-Sopron County, midway between Mosonmagyaróvár and Győr, Hungary. It has a Romanesque monastic church commenced in 1208. Similar family or clan-financed medieval Hungarian monastic churches can be found in Ják, Ócsa, Nyírbátor, Harina and Mălâncrav.

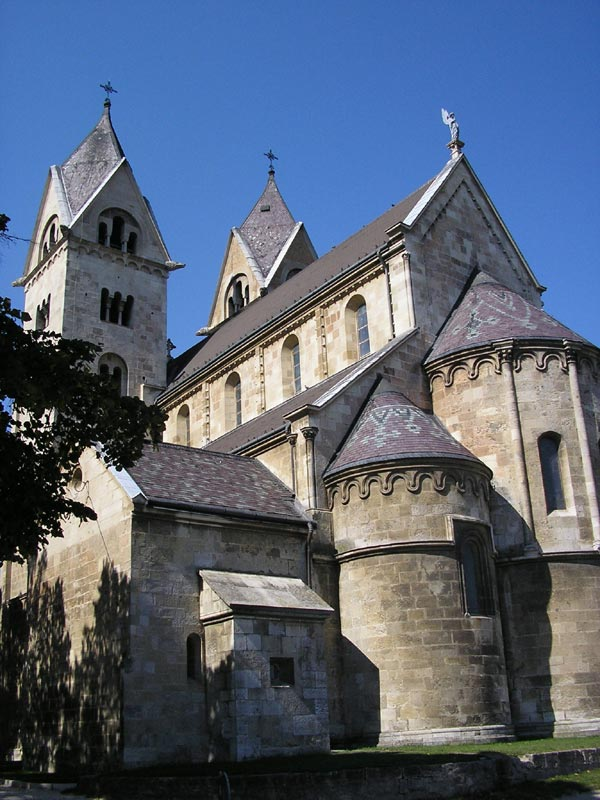
The Romanesque church

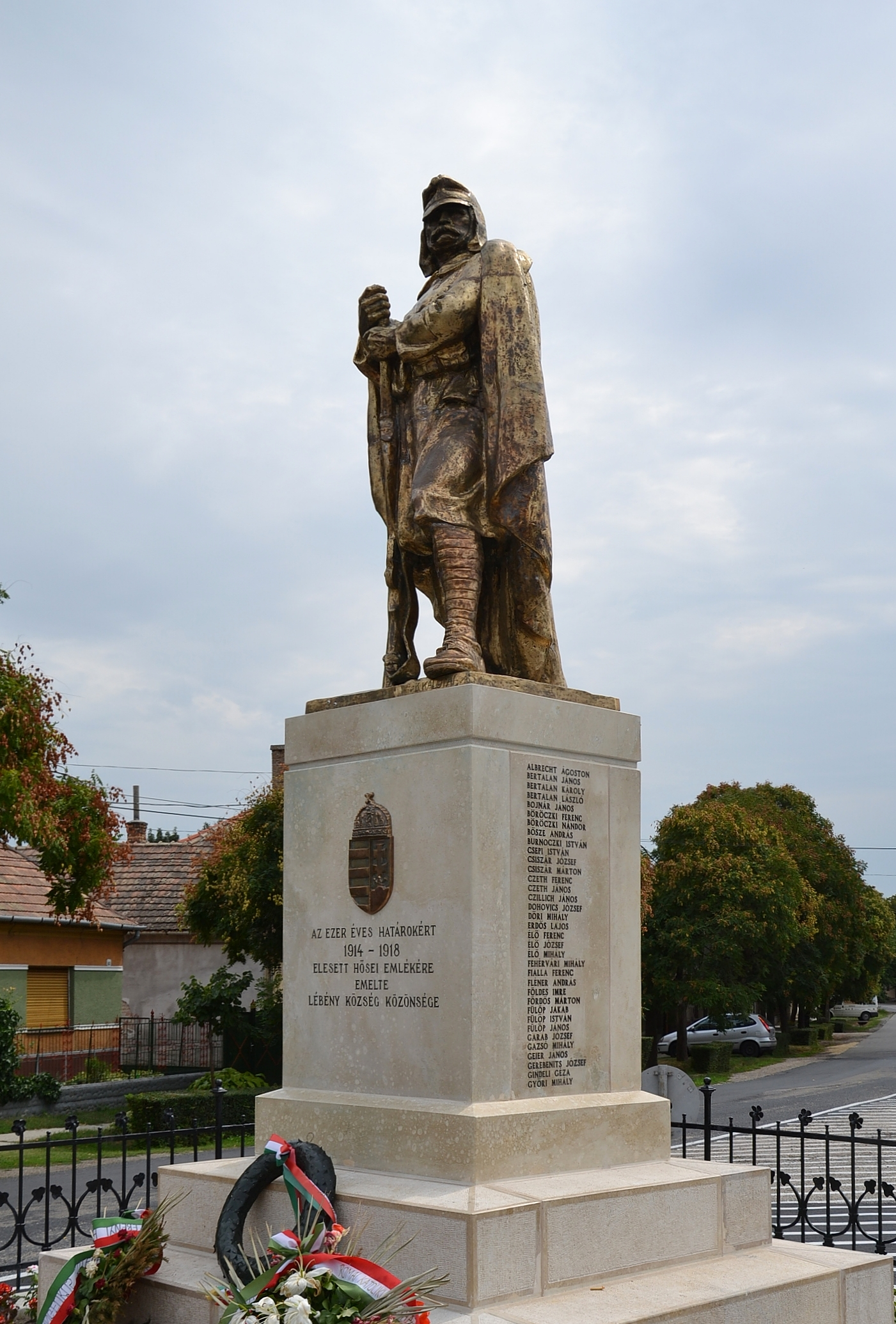
First world war memorial

== Early history ==
The Lébény area has been occupied continuously since prehistoric times. Signs of human occupation have been found from the Neolithic, through the Bronze and Iron Ages, including excavated remains of Celtic habitation. When Tiberius, later the Roman Emperor, overran Transdanubia in AD 9, he established a military camp and civilian settlement in the area of present-day Lébény.

In later centuries the region was inhabited by Huns, then by Lombards, and then by Avars, who were converted to Christianity. Excavations have confirmed there was already a sizeable community at Lébény at the time of the Hungarian Conquest of the Carpathian Basin in the 9th and 10th centuries, including Slavic groups.

The first written mention of the place was under the name Libin in 1208.

== Romanesque church ==
Now the parish church of St James the Apostle, this Romanesque church was originally built for a community of Benedictine monks. Its nave with two aisles and three apses forms a basilica structure. The capitals of the columns inside the church are carved with plant ornamentation.

== Further detail ==
- Photograph of the church with an extended historical caption: Retrieved 31 August 2017.
- Gerő László (1984): Magyar műemléki ABC (ABC of Hungarian Historical Monuments). In Hungarian
- Gervers-Molnár Vera (1972): A középkori Magyarország rotundái (Rotundas of Medieval Hungary). In Hungarian
- Henszlmann Imre (1876): Magyarország ó-keresztyén, román és átmeneti stylü mű-emlékeinek rövid ismertetése (Short Survey of Hungary's Early Christian, Romanesque, and Transitional Style Historic Monuments). In Hungarian
