= Győr County =

County of the Kingdom of Hungary

Győr County Comitatus Jauriensis (Latin) Győr vármegye (Hungarian) Komitat Raab (German)
- County of the Kingdom of Hungary (12th century-1785, 1790-1923)
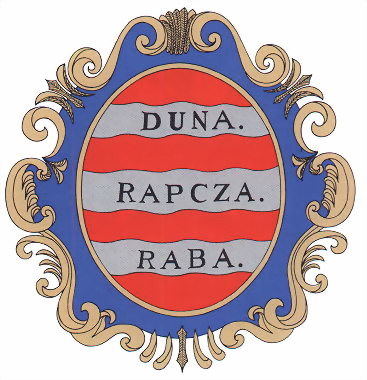
- Coat of arms

- Capital: Győr
- Area
  - Coordinates: 47°41′N 17°38′E
  - 1910: 1,534 km^{2} (592 sq mi)
- Population
  - 1910: 136,300
- History
  - Established: 12th century
  - Merged into Győr-Moson County: 1785
  - County recreated: 1790
  - Treaty of Trianon: 4 June 1920
  - Merged into Győr-Moson County: 1923
- Today part of: Hungary (1,451 km^{2}); Slovakia (83 km^{2})

Győr county (in Hungarian: Győr (vár)megye) was an administrative county (comitatus) of the Kingdom of Hungary, situated mostly on the right (south) side of the Danube river. Its territory is now part of Hungary, except seven villages on the left side of the Danube which belong to Slovakia. The capital of the county was the city of Győr.

== Geography ==
Győr county shared borders with the counties Moson, Pozsony, Komárom, Veszprém and Sopron. The rivers Danube, and Rába run through the county. Its area was 1534 km^{2} around 1910.

== History ==
The Győr comitatus arose as one of the first comitatus of the Kingdom of Hungary. Its southern part was conquered by the Ottoman Empire in 1543. The Ottoman Empire meant a constant threat to the Habsburg Kingdom of Hungary therefore the Habsburg kings divided the kingdom's remaining territory into captaincies. The Captaincy of Győr was located between lake Balaton and river Danube. In 1594, the Ottomans captured the city Győr, however an Habsburg-Hungarian army reconquered it in 1598. The other parts of Győr County were liberated from Ottoman rule in the 1680s.

In 1920 the Treaty of Trianon assigned a very small part of the territory of the county to Czechoslovakia. The rest stayed in Hungary and merged with the eastern part of Moson county and a very small part of Pozsony county to form Győr-Moson-Pozsony county in 1923.

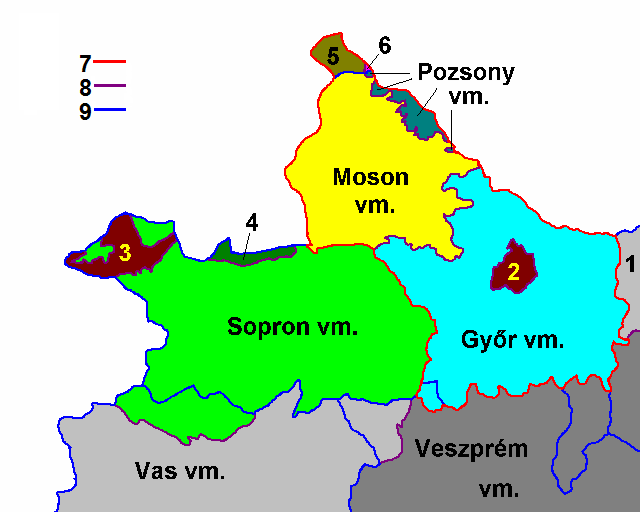
Győr and Moson counties after the Treaty of Trianon. In 1923, the two counties were merged to form Győr-Moson County. The map shows that small part of the former Pozsony County that remained in Hungary. (2) the city of Győr (urban county). (4) territory assigned from Moson County to Sopron County in 1921. (5) and (6) territory ceded to Czechoslovakia in 1947.

The county became abolished after World War II and Győr-Moson county was created instead. In 1950, Sopron county merged with Győr-Moson county to form Győr-Sopron county. This county was renamed to Győr-Moson-Sopron in 1990. The part of the county north of the river Danube is now in Slovakia, Trnava Region.

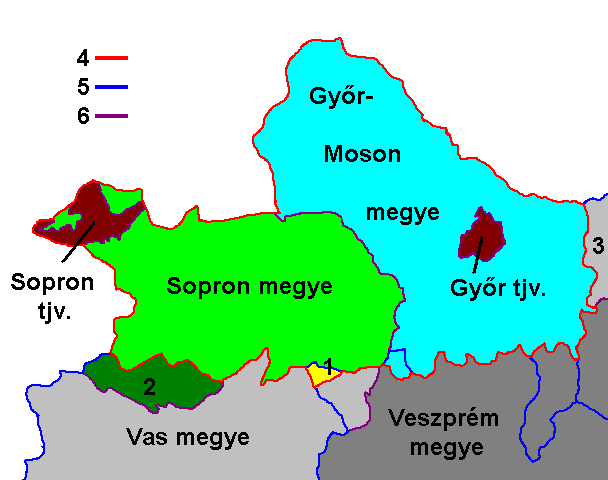
The formation of modern Győr-Moson-Sopron County. (1) territory assigned from Vas County to Győr-Moson-Sopron County in 1950. (2) territory assigned from Sopron County to Vas County in 1950.

== Demographics ==
=== 1900 ===
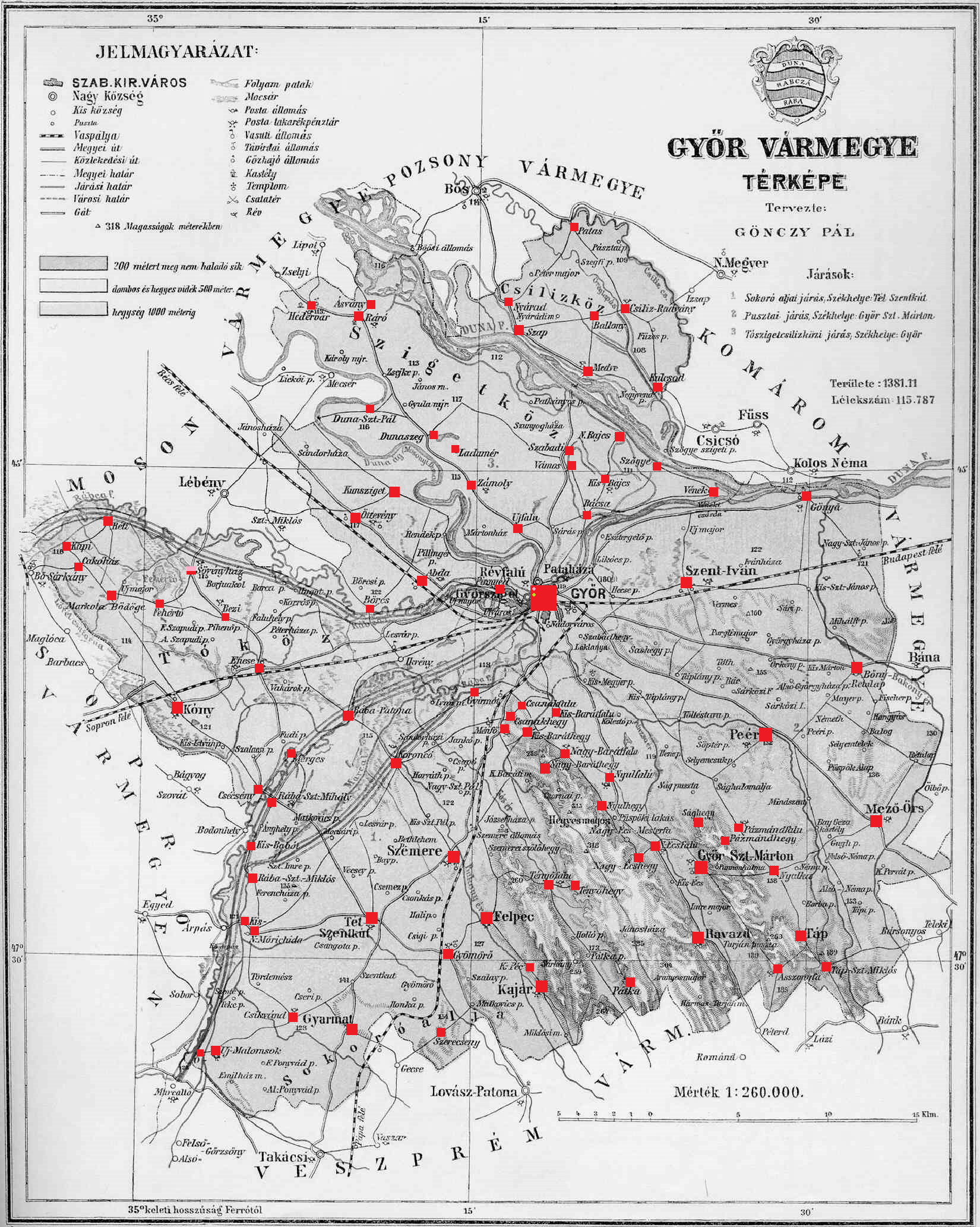
Ethnic map of the county (with data of the 1910 census). Key: red – Hungarians; pink – Germans; light green – Slovaks. Coloured dots in plain rectangles imply the presence of smaller minority populations. Multicoloured rectangles imply cities and villages with multi-ethnic populations with the order of the stripes following the ethnic composition of the settlement.

In 1900, the county had a population of 126,188 people and was composed of the following linguistic communities:

Total:

- Hungarian: 122,925 (97.4%)
- German: 2,465 (2.0%)
- Slovak: 216 (0.2%)
- Croatian: 151 (0.1%)
- Serbian: 27 (0.0%)
- Romanian: 16 (0.0%)
- Ruthenian: 2 (0.0%)
- Other or unknown: 386 (0.3%)

According to the census of 1900, the county was composed of the following religious communities:

Total:

- Roman Catholic: 94,939 (75.2%)
- Lutheran: 15,902 (12.6%)
- Calvinist: 8,800 (7.0%)
- Jewish: 6,403 (5.1%)
- Greek Orthodox: 70 (0.0%)
- Greek Catholic: 61 (0.0%)
- Unitarian: 9 (0.0%)
- Other or unknown: 4 (0.0%)

=== 1910 ===
In 1910, the county had a population of 136,295 people and was composed of the following linguistic communities:

Total:

- Hungarian: 132,991 (97.6%)
- German: 2,023 (1.5%)
- Slovak: 609 (0.5%)
- Croatian: 109 (0.0%)
- Serbian: 17 (0.0%)
- Romanian: 17 (0.0%)
- Ruthenian: 2 (0.0%)
- Other or unknown: 527 (0.4%)

According to the census of 1910, the county was composed of the following religious communities:

Total:

- Roman Catholic: 103,292 (75.8%)
- Lutheran: 16,656 (12.2%)
- Calvinist: 9,080 (6.7%)
- Jewish: 7,046 (5.2%)
- Greek Catholic: 130 (0.0%)
- Greek Orthodox: 55 (0.0%)
- Unitarian: 18 (0.0%)
- Other or unknown: 18 (0.0%)

== Subdivisions ==
In the early 20th century, the subdivisions of Győr county were:

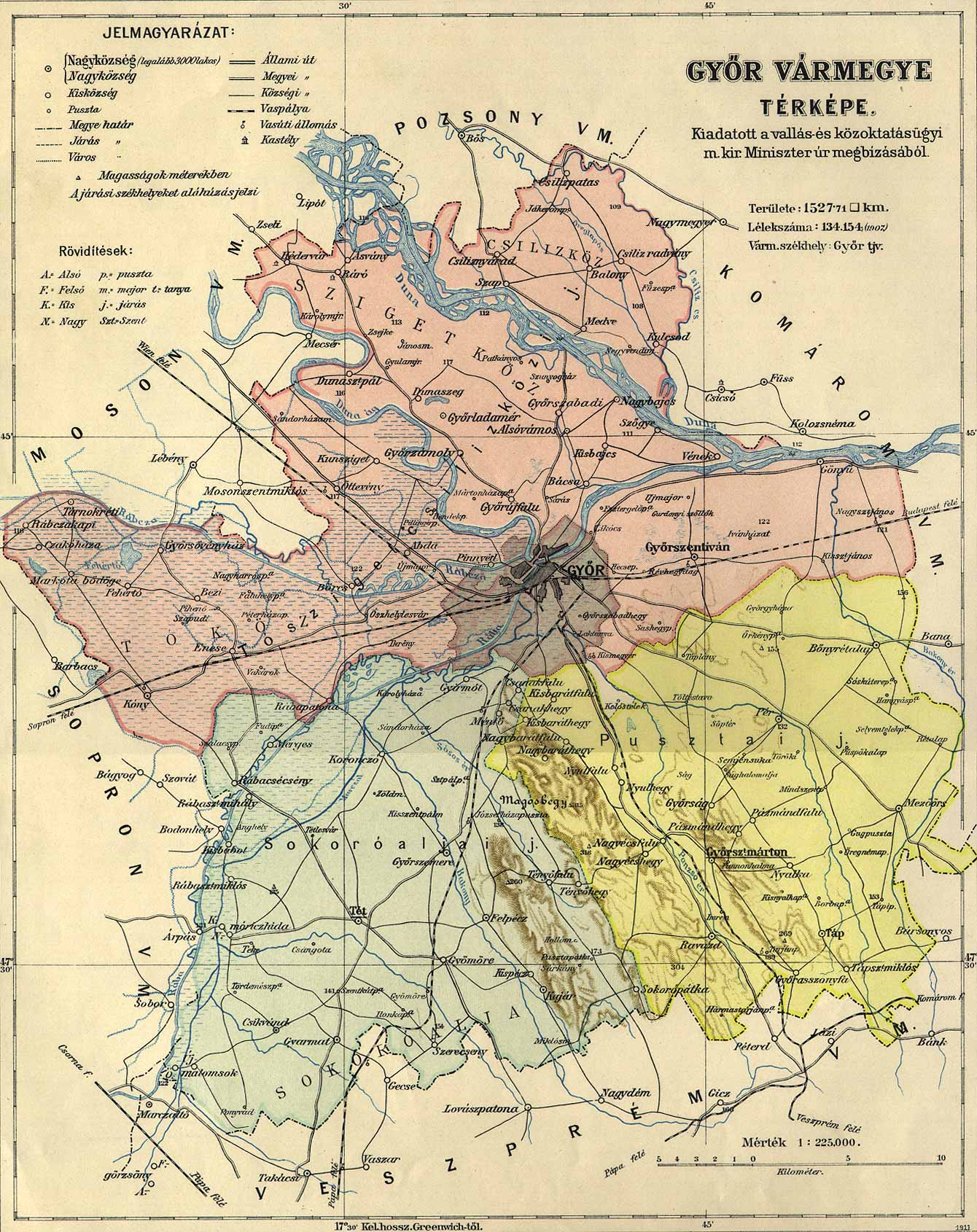

Districts (járás)
District	Capital
Puszta	Győrszentmárton (renamed Pannonhalma)
Sokoróalja	Tét
Tószigetcsilizköz	Győr
Urban counties (törvényhatósági jogú város)
Győr

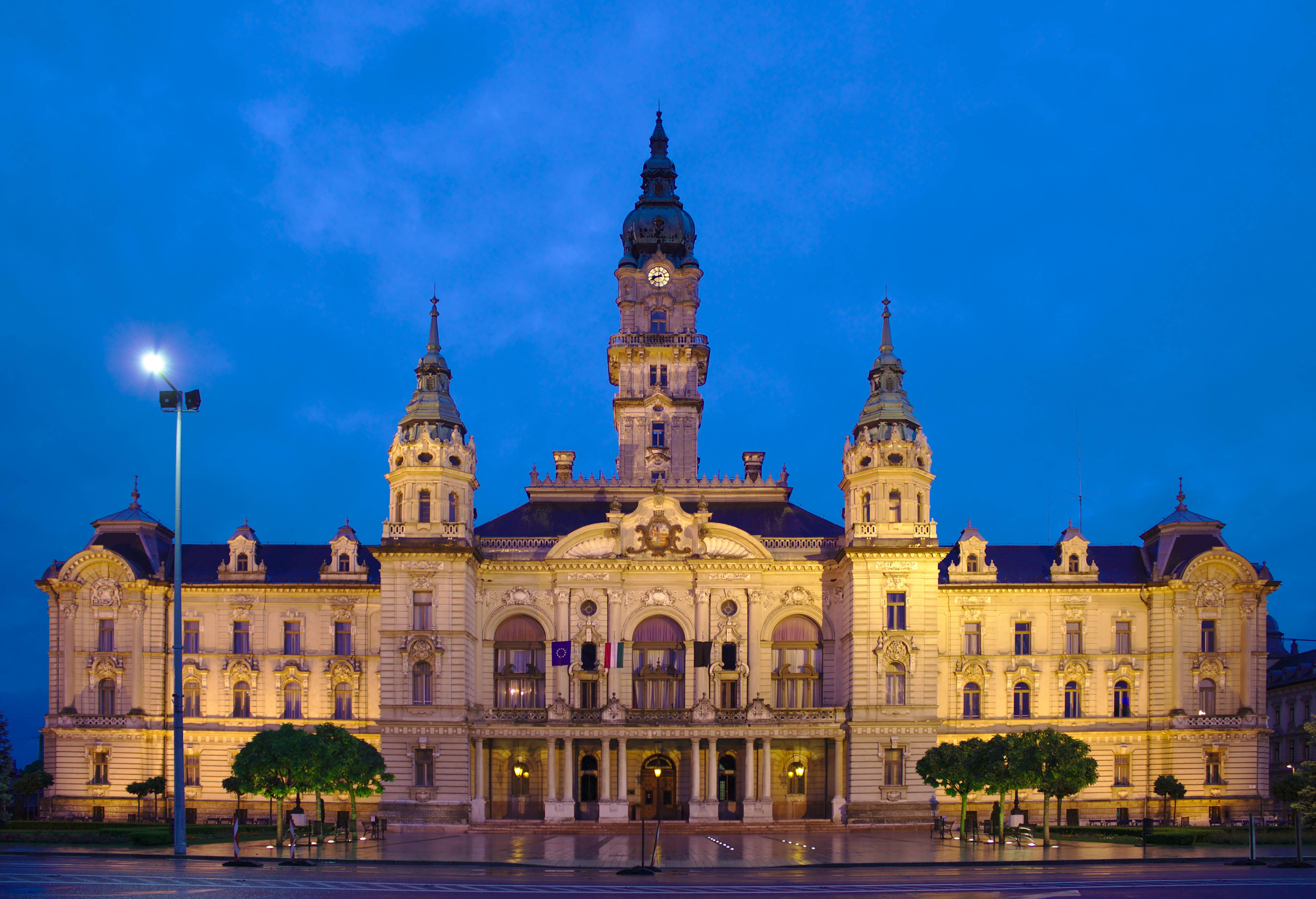
Town Hall, Győr
