= Stephen I Csák =

Hungarian nobleman (c. 1235–1279/83 CE)

Stephen (I) Csák

Master of the stewards
- Reign: 1275–1276; 1276–1279
- Predecessor: Reynold Básztély (1st term); Reynold Básztély (2nd term)
- Successor: Reynold Básztély (1st term); Peter Csák (2nd term)
- Native name: Csák (I) István
- Born: c. 1235
- Died: between 1279 and 1283
- Noble family: gens Csák
- Spouse: unknown
- Issue: none
- Father: Matthew I
- Mother: Margaret N

Stephen (I) from the kindred Csák (Hungarian: Csák nembeli (I.) István; c. 1235 – 1279/83) was a Hungarian noble and landowner, who held secular positions during the reign of king Ladislaus IV. His nephew and heir was the oligarch Matthew III Csák, who, based on his uncles' acquisitions, became the de facto ruler of his domain independently of the king and usurped royal prerogatives on his territories.

== Family ==
Stephen was born into the gens Csák as one of the four sons of Matthew I, founder and first member of the Trencsén branch, who served as master of the treasury (1242–1245), and Margaret from an unidentified noble family. Stephen's brothers were Mark I, ispán (comes) of Hont County in 1247, but there is no further information about him; Matthew II, a notable general and palatine of Hungary (1278–1280; 1282–1283); and Peter I, who also held powerful positions, including palatine (1275–1276; 1277; 1278; 1281) and who, furthermore, was the father of the notorious Matthew III. He had also a younger sister, who married to the Moravian noble Zdislav Sternberg, a loyal bannerman of the Csák clan. Their son, Stephen Sternberg (or "the Bohemian") later inherited the Csák dominion because of the absence of a direct adult male descendant after the death of Matthew III in 1321.

== Career ==
Stephen was first mentioned by a royal charter, issued in 1260. According to this, he formerly occupied the village of Tata from the local Benedictine abbey. Pope Innocent IV, who died in 1254, instructed Zlaudus Ják, the Bishop of Veszprém to recover the estate for the Roman Catholic Church. Thus Stephen's tyrannical act occurred in or before 1254, so he might have been born around 1235. However Stephen did not give back the possession to its rightful owner until 1260, as a result Innocent's successor, Pope Alexander IV asked the Hungarian king, Béla IV to force him.

He, along with Matthew II and Peter I, was an influential supporter of duke Stephen, who rebelled against his father, Béla's rule and took over the government of Transylvania in the 1260s. During that time, Stephen I Csák served as master of the stewards in Stephen's ducal court in 1263. After the coronation of Ladislaus IV, he was appointed ispán of Trencsén County in 1272, according to historian Gyula Kristó. However Attila Zsoldos identified Stephen Rátót as the noble who held that office in the first regnal year of the minor Ladislaus. There is no record that he would have reached an office during the reign of Stephen V (1270–1272), whom he faithfully supported in the civil war between father and son. In 1275, Stephen was certainly ispán of Trencsén County. After that he served as master of the stewards between 1275 and 1276. Besides that he also functioned as ispán of Bars County (1275–1276), Bánya (1275) and Szolgagyőr ispánates (1276). He was replaced by Reynold Básztély for a short time in 1276, however he retook the position yet at the same year and held the office until 1279. He was also ispán of Pozsony County (1277–1279). He was succeeded by his younger brother, Peter I in both positions. According to Zsoldos, it is conceivable that Stephen was also master of the treasury (1273) and ispán of Sopron County (1280).

Alongside his brother Matthew II, Stephen was a commander of the Hungarian forces in the Battle on the Marchfeld in August 1278. Ottokar aus der Gaal's Steirische Reimchronik ("Styrian Rhyming Chronicle") refers to him as "Stephan von Schiltberg", i.e. "Stephen from the Vértes Hills". The last mention of his name occurs in 1279, when Ladislaus IV called him "magister" Stephen, the son of magister Matthew from the kindred Csák as his "beloved and faithful baron" (Latin: nobilis vir et honestus magister Stephanus filius magistri Mathey de genere Chak dilectus et fidelis baro noster). The Annales Sancti Rudberti Salisburgensis mentions that Ladislaus IV ate together with two barons, including "a brother of" Matthew Csák in 1282. Then he told the guards to arrest the two barons, who, however, chose death. Matthew Csák, accordingly, fled Hungary, but the queen Isabella of Sicily called him back to take part in the funeral procession. Matthew made an alliance with other disgruntled nobles and sent a diplomatic mission to Rudolf I of Germany. Historian Veronika Rudolf identified Matthew's captured and assassinated brother with Stephen, if at all the text can be accepted as authentic. Stephen had no children, as a result Matthew III inherited his property, who later became the greatest enemy of Charles I during the king's war against the oligarchs and for the unified realm.

== Possessions ==
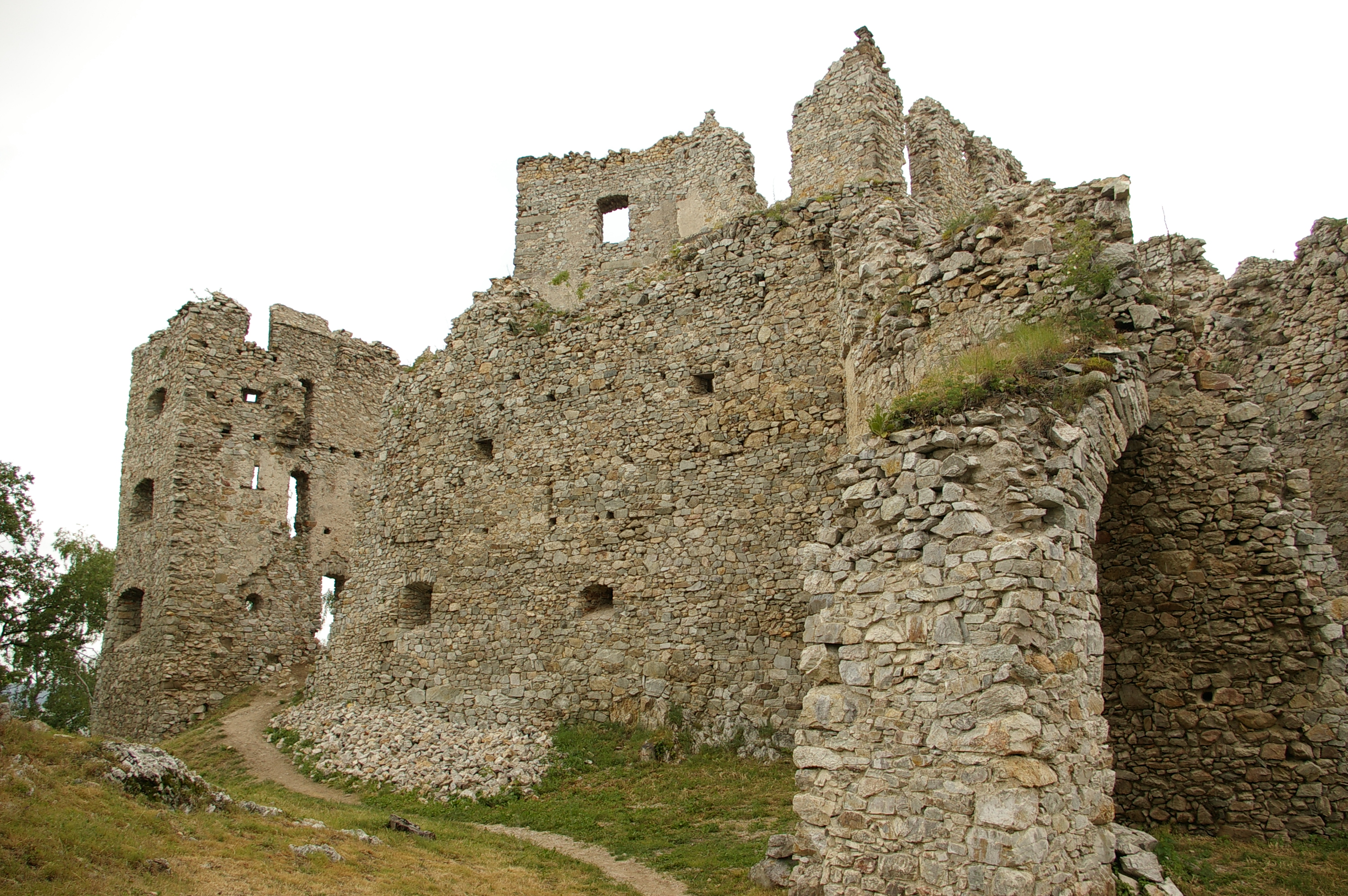
The ruins of Hrussó (Hrušov) Castle

Stephen I was a landowner near Almásfüzitő in 1269. Alongside Matthew II and Peter I, he began to acquire possessions in the north-western counties of the Kingdom of Hungary and left the ancient estates of the genus in Fejér County (e. g. Csákvár). During the rule of Béla IV, he already crossed the Danube, because the king donated Palást, Hont County (today: Plášťovce, Slovakia) to him. Stephen exchanged his land in Hetény, Komárom County (today: Chotín, Slovakia) to Kistapolcsány, Bars County (today: Topoľčianky, Slovakia) and 100 marks. Before 1274, he also owned Mahola, Vajkóc (today: Volkovce, Slovakia) and Tajna (today part of Tajná, Slovakia), however, these possessions and 50 marks were sold by Stephen for the lands of castle warriors in Bori (today: Bory, Slovakia).

Stephen tried to establish his dominion in the sparsely populated northern part of Bars County. Perhaps he was the noble, who built Hrussó (Hrušov) Castle near Szkicó (today: Skýcov, Slovakia), which became his centre. King Ladislaus IV donated Ugróc (today: Veľké Uherce, Slovakia) and Oszlány (today: Oslany, Slovakia) in 1274, establishing an elongated and contiguous dominion in North Bars County.

== Sources ==
- (in Hungarian) Kristó, Gyula (1986). Csák Máté ("Matthew Csák"). Magyar História, Gondolat. Budapest. ISBN 963-281-736-2
- (in Hungarian) Markó, László (2006). A magyar állam főméltóságai Szent Istvántól napjainkig – Életrajzi Lexikon ("The High Officers of the Hungarian State from Saint Stephen to the Present Days – A Biographical Encyclopedia") (2nd edition); Helikon Kiadó Kft., Budapest; ISBN 963-547-085-1.
- Rudolf, Veronika (2023). Közép-Európa a hosszú 13. században [Central Europe in the Long 13th Century] (in Hungarian). Arpadiana XV., Research Centre for the Humanities. ISBN 978-963-416-406-7.
- (in Hungarian) Zsoldos, Attila (2011). Magyarország világi archontológiája, 1000–1301 ("Secular Archontology of Hungary, 1000–1301"). História, MTA Történettudományi Intézete. Budapest. ISBN 978-963-9627-38-3

Stephen I Genus Csák Born: c. 1235 Died: between 1279 and 1283
Political offices
Preceded by Reynold Básztély	Master of the stewards 1275–1276	Succeeded by Reynold Básztély
Preceded by Reynold Básztély	Master of the stewards 1276–1279	Succeeded by Peter Csák
