= Matthew II Csák =

Hungarian baron and landowner

Matthew (II) Csák
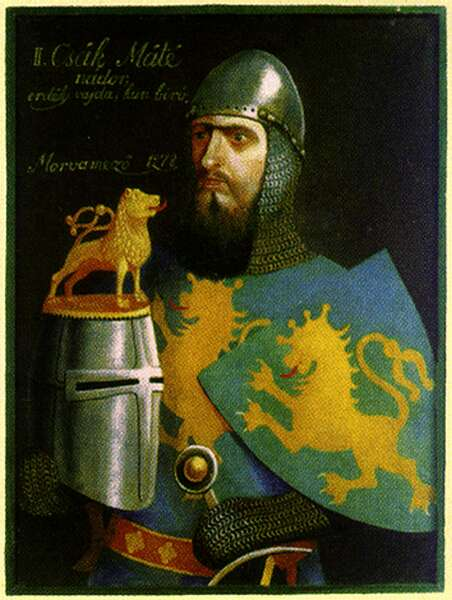

Palatine of Hungary
- Reign: 1278–1280; 1282–1283
- Predecessor: Peter Csák (1st term); Ivan Kőszegi (2nd term)
- Successor: Finta Aba (1st term); Denis Péc (2nd term)
- Native name: Csák (II) Máté
- Born: between 1235 and 1240
- Died: 1283 or 1284
- Noble family: gens Csák
- Spouse: unknown
- Issue: a daughter
- Father: Matthew I
- Mother: Margaret N

Matthew (II) from the kindred Csák (Hungarian: Csák nembeli (II.) Máté; Slovak: Matúš Čák II; Romanian: Matei Csáki al II-lea; c. 1235 – 1283 or 1284) was a powerful Hungarian baron, landowner and military leader, who held several secular positions during the reign of kings Béla IV, Stephen V and Ladislaus IV. He was the first notable member of the Trencsén branch of the gens ("clan") Csák. His nephew and heir was the oligarch Matthew III Csák, who, based on his uncles' acquisitions, became the de facto ruler of his domain independently of the king and usurped royal prerogatives on his territories.

== Family ==
He was born around 1235 as one of the four sons of Matthew I, founder and first member of the Trencsén branch, who served as master of the treasury (1242–1245), and Margaret from an unidentified noble family. Matthew II's brothers were Mark I, ispán (comes) of Hont County in 1247, but there is no further information about him; Stephen I, master of the stewards from 1275 to 1276 and from 1276 to 1279; and Peter I, who held powerful positions, including palatine (1275–1276; 1277; 1278; 1281) and who, furthermore, was the father of the notorious Matthew III. He had also a younger sister, who married to the Moravian noble Zdislav Sternberg, a loyal bannerman of the Csák clan. Their son, Stephen Sternberg (or "the Bohemian") later inherited the Csák dominion because of the absence of a direct adult male descendant after the death of Matthew III in 1321.

Matthew II married to an unknown noblewoman from an unidentified genus. This marriage produced an unidentified daughter, who was born in 1263 with lameness and withered arm. According to a 1276 testimony of Matthew's mother, lady Margaret, who was nun at the Dominican monastery at the 'Rabbits' Island by that time, Matthew brought his eight-year-old daughter to the monastery in 1271 and asked his mother to intercede with the recently deceased Saint Margaret, and his hopes where fulfilled, as the girl was cured aﬅer being placed next to the saint's tomb. This testimony was part of the investigations of saint Margaret's canonization procedure in 1276.

Matthew died without male descendants and his brothers had already died for that time, as a result, in 1283, he nominated his nephew, Matthew III to inherit his property and large-scale possessions, which laid the foundation of a de facto independent domain, encompassing the north-western counties of the kingdom (today roughly the western half of present-day Slovakia and parts of Northern Hungary).

== Career ==
His name was first mentioned by an authentic royal charter on 13 June 1270, when he served as voivode of Transylvania (1270–1272), which indicates Matthew II reached influence only after the death of king Béla IV, thus he was a loyal supporter of duke Stephen, who rebelled against his father's rule and took over the government of Transylvania in the 1260s. During the civil war between Béla IV and his son Stephen, Peter and Matthew Csák were entrusted with gathering a small contingent and marching into Northeast Hungary to rescue the younger king's family. Later, in January 1265, they returned from Upper Hungary to Transylvania, where they collected and reorganised the younger king's army and persuaded the Saxons to return to Stephen's allegiance. The battle took place along the wall of Feketehalom, where Stephen was surrounded, between the two armies at the end of January, while Duke Stephen led his remaining garrison out of the fort. The royalist troops were defeated soundly. According to a charter issued in 1273, Matthew II participated in the Battle of Isaszeg in March 1265, where Stephen gained a strategic victory over his father's army. After that Béla IV was forced to accept the authority of Stephen in the eastern parts of the kingdom. On 23 March 1266, father and son confirmed the peace in the Convent of the Blessed Virgin on 'Rabbits' Island. The Transylvanian voivodeship and the income of Szolnok County were Matthew's reward when Stephen V ascended the throne in 1270. He took part in a military campaign against Ottokar II of Bohemia in 1271. Alongside his brother Peter Csák and Nicholas Baksa, Matthew led an army to the river Moson to prevent the invading Czechs from crossing, but the troops of Ottokar II routed their army at Mosonmagyaróvár on 15 May 1271. Nevertheless, Stephen V won a decisive battle over the Bohemians. Matthew and Peter were among those barons, who ratified the peace of Pressburg in July 1271. Matthew held the voivodeship until the sudden death of Stephen V in August 1272, after that he was replaced by Nicholas Geregye, a former supporter of Béla IV. Only a validly assumed non-authentic charter refers to Matthew II as voivode in April 1273.

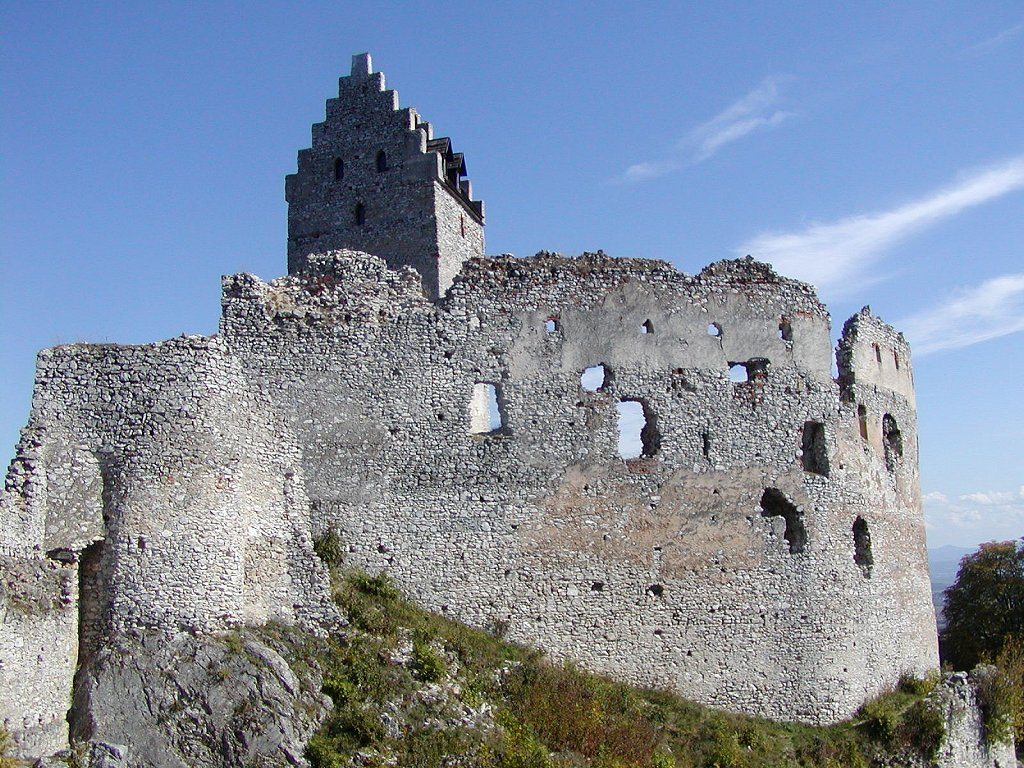
Tapolcsány Castle (Podhradie, Slovakia)

During the time when tensions emerged between Béla IV and his son, Stephen, two rival baronial groups developed, one of them was led by Henry I Kőszegi ("Henry the Great"), also involving the Gutkeled and Geregye clans, while the Trencsén branch of the Csák clan dominated the second group. Following the coronation of Stephen V in 1270, leaders of Béla IV's party fled to abroad from the potential retaliations, however they returned to Hungary, when the crown passed to the minor Ladislaus IV in August 1272. During the nominal regency of queen Elizabeth the Cuman both sides wished to take part in the exercise of power. The rivalry between the two parties characterized the following years. According to historian Bálint Hóman, twelve "changes of government" took place in the first five regnal years of Ladislaus IV. This kind of "political pendulum" is well illustrated by the fact that Matthew II functioned as ban of Slavonia from 27 November 1272 to April 1273, replacing the rival Joachim Gutkeled. However, he too has been replaced by a rival, Henry I Kőszegi. After that Matthew II served as judge royal and ispán of Bánya (Árkibánya) ispánate within Nyitra County in the summer of 1273. Soon, however, he was ignored again, because Nicholas II Gutkeled from the opposite group replaced him as judge royal. In the next year, Matthew II regained his political influence in the court, when he was appointed voivode of Transylvania in 1274 and held that office until the following year with a small interruption, when Nicholas Geregye retook the position for several months. Between 1275 and 1276, he became master of the treasury, besides that he also functioned as ispán of Pozsony, Baranya Counties and Bánya ispánate. In 1276, he served as voivode for the fourth time, replacing his distant relative, Ugrin Csák.

Coat of arms of the gens Csák

Matthew II remained partisan of the king at all times, in accordance with the Csák tradition. In contrast, the Kőszegi family gradually manifested its disloyalty to the Árpád dynasty, first of all, when Henry the Great returned to Hungary from exile in Bohemia in 1272, assassinated Béla of Macsó, a grandson of the late Béla IV and partitioned the territory of the Duchy of Macsó among the barons. In 1274, he and Joachim Gutkeled captured and imprisoned the child Ladislaus IV himself and after the release of the royal, they also thrown into prison the king's younger brother, prince Andrew weeks later. In August 1274, an armed conflict broke out between the two baronial groups. Meanwhile, Matthew II fought against Ottokar II of Bohemia in early 1273 at Styria and Carinthia, who also laid claim to the title king of Germany. He led that army, consisted of several barons, into the region, which plundered these region for a month. Matthew's troops besieged Fürstenfeld and a certain fort Lastruch. Following that Matthew led his army against Carinthia, while Ivan Kőszegi plundered Styria. These incursions prompted Ottokar II to launch a large-scale invasion against Hungary in the spring of 1273. As a result, the rival barons, including Matthew, formed a unity coalition against the invading Bohemians, putting aside their differences against each other. Despite the earlier conflicts, the Csáks were temporarily considered supporters of reconciliation with Ottokar II in 1275, for domestic political reasons, in order to counterbalance the efforts of Joachim Gutkeled and the Kőszegis. Matthew was one of the two commanders (the other one was his brother, Stephen Csák) of the Hungarian army in the Battle on the Marchfeld on 26 August 1278, where Ottokar II was killed. Matthew's army consisted of approximately 2,000 Hungarian and 5,000 Cuman warriors of light cavalry. Despite Ladislaus' presence, Matthew was the commander of the entire Hungarian contingent in effect, alongside his brother Stephen Csák, according to the Steirische Reimchronik ("Styrian Rhyming Chronicle"). Matthew's bravery and heroism during the battle had been documented by German chronicles.

After his last voivodeship (1276), he held only local head functions in the next two years; he was ispán of Moson (1277–1278), Sopron (1277–1279) and Vas (1277) Counties. However, soon, his political career reached the top, when he was appointed palatine of Hungary in December 1278, succeeding his brother, Peter I in that position. Besides that he also became judge of the Cuman people, ispán of Bánya ispánate and Somogy County. In this capacity, Ladislaus IV entrusted him to restore of public safety in the realm. As palatine, Matthew made a proactive role in the conclusion of peace between the Gutkeleds and the Slavonian Babonić family after a series of border wars. According to a royal charter he provided "truth" in the name of the king at Sopron in February 1279, when he ordered the execution of a town's citizen, Peter. Later Ladislaus IV donated Peter's lands to Denis Osl, who formerly saved the life of Matthew II in the Battle on the Marchfeld. This fact clearly indicates that Matthew II, like the other contemporary lords, put his own follower in a stronger position, abusing his office. He also started to establish a so-called "private army" with the participation of his royal servants. Several charters preserved, some landowners have complained to the king concern that the palatine harassed and plundered their possessions.

The activity of papal legate Philip, Bishop of Fermo since late 1279 demolished the fragile peace, when excommunicated Ladislaus IV and placed Hungary under interdict because of the pagan Cumans' growing influence. The barons were divided in the support of King Ladislaus the Cuman. Tensions escalated when the king decided to arrest and imprisoned Philip of Fermo in early January 1280. The thoughtless act has resulted that Hungary confronted with the whole Christian Europe and the Church. Presumably under the leadership of Palatine Matthew Csák, the barons decided to imprison Ladislaus IV. Sometimes after 17 January 1280, when the king stayed in Transylvania, Finta Aba captured Ladislaus IV. In less than two months, both the legate and the king were set free and Ladislaus took a new oath to enforce the Cuman laws and also forgave his captors. In the summer of 1280, Matthew was replaced by Finta Aba, brother of Amadeus Aba, as palatine. However, he was appointed palatine for a second term two years later, replacing Ivan Kőszegi, the late Henry the Great's son. Besides that he was also ispán of Sopron (1282), Pozsony and Somogy Counties (1282–1283). He held these offices until his death. He prepared his last will and testament on 15 April 1283. Chronologically the next royal charter refers to him as a deceased person on 9 August 1284. The Annales Sancti Rudberti Salisburgensis mentions that Ladislaus IV ate together with two barons, including "a brother of" Matthew Csák in 1282. Then he told the guards to arrest the two barons, who, however, chose death. Matthew Csák, accordingly, fled Hungary, but the queen Isabella of Sicily called him back to take part in the funeral procession. Matthew made an alliance with other disgruntled nobles and sent a diplomatic mission to Rudolf I of Germany. Historian Veronika Rudolf identified Matthew's captured and assassinated brother with Stephen, if at all the text can be accepted as authentic. However, Matthew soon died, so the matter was dropped from the agenda.

== Possessions ==
Despite his successful political and military career, Matthew II was not among the largest landowners in Hungary. He had estates in Komárom County, north of the Danube in Hetény (today: Chotín, Slovakia) and to the south near the village of Bille (today part of Esztergom). According to his testament in 1283, Prasic (today: Prašice, Slovakia), Nemcsic and Jác (today: Jacovce, Slovakia), in the north part of Nyitra County, also belonged to his domain, which he inherited probably from his brother, Stephen I, because these lands were located close to Hrussó Castle, centre of his brother's former estate. At first his wife inherited this property, however she also died shortly, after that Matthew III, son of the youngest brother Peter I acquired the lands. The Dominican monastery at the 'Rabbits' Island, where the Csák brothers' widow mother lived for a long time, had inherited Gyirok and Nándor (Komárom County).

Matthew II established his centre at Tapolcsány (today: Podhradie, Slovakia), where a stone castle was built and strengthened. He did not donate his estates in Nyitra County to the Church, those remained in the clan. Perhaps he had also estates or vassals in Pozsony County, maybe one of them was Thomas Hont-Pázmány, for whom Matthew II, as palatine, acted to the Archdiocese of Esztergom, in connection with a payment of a loss. The expansion in Pozsony County caused conflicts between the Csák clan and the Kőszegi family, which had long been a landowner in the county.

== Sources ==
- Csepregi, Ildikó; Klaniczay, Gábor; Péterfi, Bence (2018). The Oldest Legend: Acts of the Canonization Process, and Miracles of Saint Margaret of Hungary. Central European University Press. ISBN 9789633862186.
- Engel, Pál (2001). The Realm of St Stephen: A History of Medieval Hungary, 895-1526. I.B. Tauris Publishers. ISBN 1-86064-061-3.
- (in Hungarian) Fügedi, Erik (1986). Ispánok, bárók, kiskirályok ("Ispáns, Barons, Oligarchs"). Nemzet és emlékezet, Magvető Könyvkiadó. Budapest. ISBN 963-14-0582-6
- (in Hungarian) Kristó, Gyula (1986). Csák Máté ("Matthew Csák"). Magyar História, Gondolat. Budapest. ISBN 963-281-736-2
- (in Hungarian) Markó, László (2006). A magyar állam főméltóságai Szent Istvántól napjainkig – Életrajzi Lexikon ("The High Officers of the Hungarian State from Saint Stephen to the Present Days – A Biographical Encyclopedia") (2nd edition); Helikon Kiadó Kft., Budapest; ISBN 963-547-085-1.
- Rudolf, Veronika (2023). Közép-Európa a hosszú 13. században [Central Europe in the Long 13th Century] (in Hungarian). Arpadiana XV., Research Centre for the Humanities. ISBN 978-963-416-406-7.
- (in Hungarian) Zsoldos, Attila (2011). Magyarország világi archontológiája, 1000–1301 ("Secular Archontology of Hungary, 1000–1301"). História, MTA Történettudományi Intézete. Budapest. ISBN 978-963-9627-38-3

Matthew II Genus Csák Born: between 1235 and 1240 Died: 1283 or 1284
Political offices
Preceded by Nicholas Geregye	Voivode of Transylvania; 1270–1272	Succeeded by Nicholas Geregye
Preceded by Joachim Gutkeled	Ban of Slavonia; 1272–1273	Succeeded by Henry Kőszegi
Preceded by Ladislaus Kán	Judge royal 1273	Succeeded by Ladislaus Kán
Preceded by Nicholas Geregye	Voivode of Transylvania; 1274	Succeeded by Nicholas Geregye
Preceded by Nicholas Geregye	Voivode of Transylvania; 1274–1275	Succeeded by Ugrin Csák
Preceded by Joachim Gutkeled	Master of the treasury 1275–1276	Succeeded by Ivan Kőszegi
Preceded by Ugrin Csák	Voivode of Transylvania; 1276	Succeeded by Nicholas Pok
Preceded by Peter Csák	Palatine of Hungary; 1278–1280	Succeeded by Finta Aba
Preceded by Ivan Kőszegi	Palatine of Hungary; 1282–1283	Succeeded by Denis Péc
