= Matthew I Csák =

13th-century Hungarian noble

Matthew (I) Csák

Master of the treasury
- Reign: 1242–1245
- Predecessor: Dominic Rátót
- Successor: Osl Osl
- Native name: Csák (I) Máté
- Born: Unknown
- Died: between 1245 and 1249
- Noble family: gens Csák
- Spouse: Margaret N
- Issue: Mark I Stephen I Matthew II; Peter I a daughter
- Father: unknown

Matthew (I) from the kindred Csák (Hungarian: Csák nembeli (I.) Máté; Slovak: Matúš Čák I; ? – 1245/1249) was a powerful Hungarian baron of king Béla IV, the first known member of the Trencsén branch of the gens (clan) Csák. His grandson was the oligarch Matthew III Csák.

== Family ==
He was born into the Csák clan from unknown parents, as a result there is an inability to connect the Trencsén branch to the other branches of the clan. In 1235, when he was first mentioned by contemporary records, Matthew had already begun his political career as a well-known member of junior king Béla's court, therefore it was not necessary to distinguish him from the other lords by specifying the name of his father. Matthew I married Margaret from an unidentified family. The marriage produced five children (four sons and a daughter): the eldest one was Mark I, ispán (comes) of Hont County in 1247, but there is no further information about him; Stephen I, master of the stewards from 1275 to 1276 and from 1276 to 1279; Matthew II, a notable general and palatine of Hungary (1278–1280; 1282–1283); and Peter I, who also held powerful positions, including palatine (1275–1276; 1277; 1278; 1281) and who, furthermore, was the father of the notorious Matthew III.

They had also a daughter, who married to the Moravian noble Zdislav Sternberg, a loyal bannerman of the Csák clan. Their son, Stephen Sternberg (or "the Bohemian") later inherited the Csák dominion because of the absence of a direct adult male descendant after the death of Matthew III in 1321. After Matthew I's death, his wife, Margaret joined the Dominican monastery at the 'Rabbits' Island and lived there until her death.

== Career ==
During the rule of Andrew II of Hungary, he supported the crown prince, when Béla's relation with his father became even worse. The king entrusted his son with the government of Transylvania with the title of duke. After the death of Andrew II on 21 September 1235, Béla ascended the throne without any opposition and Robert, Archbishop of Esztergom crowned him on 14 October in Székesfehérvár. On the same day, Matthew I was appointed master of the stewards, one of the great offices in the Kingdom of Hungary. During the first years of Béla IV, a new aristocracy arose, whom the king could rely on. Béla's main purpose was to restore the royal power that had weakened during his father's rule; e.g., he ordered the burning of his advisors' seats, because he wanted to force them to stand in the presence of the king. As he also wanted to strengthen the position of the towns, he confirmed the charter of Székesfehérvár and granted new privileges to several key towns in the kingdom. Furthermore, Béla dismissed his father's former loyal followers and advisors (during this time, for example, former palatines Denis, son of Ampud was blinded and Julius Kán was imprisoned). That consideration explains Matthew's rise in a short time from obscurity to the largest positions. He held the office at least until 23 September 1241. Besides that, he also functioned as ispán of Temes (1235–1238) and Nyitra Counties (1240–1242).

Following the disastrous Battle of Mohi (11 April 1241), Béla IV fled the scene to Spalato (today: Split, Croatia), where Matthew I was also a member of the king's men. After the Mongol invasion of Hungary, Matthew I was appointed master of the treasury, thus he became responsible for the royal's economic and financial affairs. Beside that position, he was also ispán of Sopron (1242) and Pozsony Counties (1242–1245).

Béla IV donated Chrenóc (Slovak: Chrenovec; today part of Chrenovec-Brusno) in Nyitra County to Matthew I in 1243. One year later he acquired the estate of Pruszka (today: Pruské, Slovakia) in Trencsén County, which previous landowner died without heirs. Later Matthew I exchanged that land to Tunig, Pozsony County. According to a royal charter issued in 1249, Béla IV formerly also donated Racsic (Slovak: Račice; today part of Nitrica) to Matthew, who was already dead by that time. There is no source about his inherited possessions, thus data on his four sons' inherited estates also does not exist. Consequently, he did not initiate his family through the establishment of oligarchical power with land acquisitions, he just marked its direction (from the ancient estates of the genus in Fejér County to northwest).

Matthew I Csák was last mentioned by sources on 12 December 1245. As it's written above, he had already died by 1249, according to the king's diploma. In contrast his widow, Margaret, who lived in the 'Rabbits' Island for a long time, claimed in 1276 that she was 51 years old and her husband died 22 years ago, so in 1254. The royal charter, however, is a more reliable source, because medieval people found the years and times difficult to keep track.

== Sources ==
- (in Hungarian) Kristó, Gyula (1986). Csák Máté ("Matthew Csák"). Magyar História, Gondolat. Budapest. ISBN 963-281-736-2
- (in Hungarian) Markó, László (2006). A magyar állam főméltóságai Szent Istvántól napjainkig – Életrajzi Lexikon ("The High Officers of the Hungarian State from Saint Stephen to the Present Days – A Biographical Encyclopedia") (2nd edition); Helikon Kiadó Kft., Budapest; ISBN 963-547-085-1.
- (in Hungarian) Zsoldos, Attila (2011). Magyarország világi archontológiája, 1000–1301 ("Secular Archontology of Hungary, 1000–1301"). História, MTA Történettudományi Intézete. Budapest. ISBN 978-963-9627-38-3

Matthew I Genus Csák Born: ? Died: before 23 July 1249
Political offices
Preceded by Michael Bána	Master of the stewards 1235–1241	Succeeded by Roland Rátót
Preceded by Dominic Rátót	Master of the treasury 1242–1245	Succeeded by Osl Osl
