= Csák (genus) =

Genus (gens) Csák
- Country: Kingdom of Hungary
- Founded: 10th century
- Founder: Csák (grandson of chieftain Szabolcs?)
- Cadet branches: 12 branches, including: Újlak branch Trencsén branch

Csák was the name of a gens (Latin for "clan"; nemzetség in Hungarian) in the Kingdom of Hungary.

== Origin ==
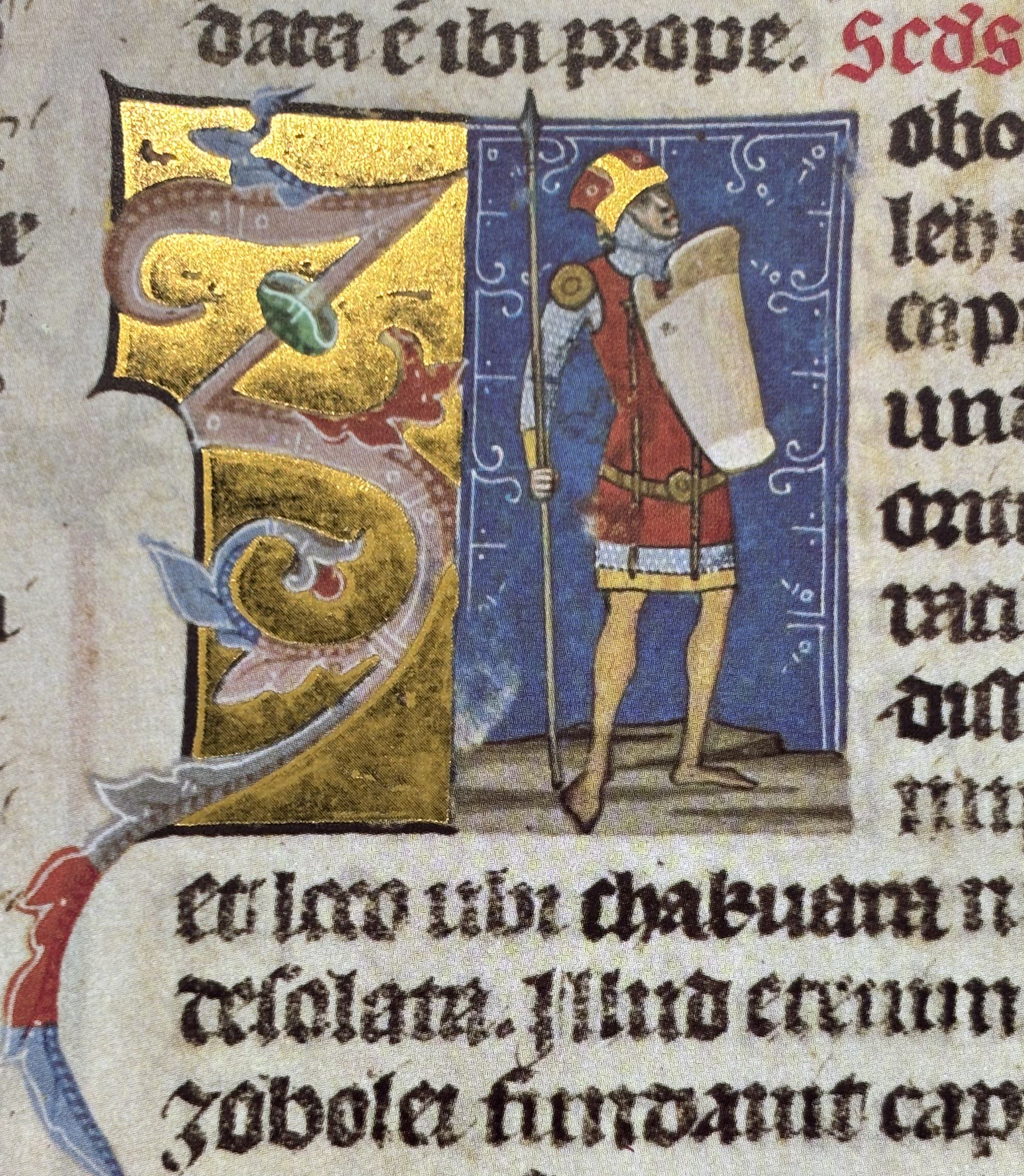
Captain Szabolcs, ancestor of the Csák kindred (Illuminated Chronicle)

The Gesta Hunnorum et Hungarorum ("Deeds of the Huns and Hungarians") records that the ancestor of the family was Szabolcs, son of chieftain Előd, the leader of one of the seven Magyar tribes.

The gens divided into 12 branches and several families in the course of the centuries. The Csáky de Mihály family also belongs to the Csák gens.

== Notable members of the clan ==
- Csák, ancestor and denominator of the gens Csák
- Ugrin (12th century), ispán

=== Ugod branch ===
The numbering means within the branch.

- Luka
  - Demetrius I (fl. 1217–1254), judge royal (1233–1234; 1242–1245)
    - Ugod (fl. 1264–1270)
      - Demetrius II (fl. 1277–1285; d. before 1287), wildgrave of Bakony (1281); married N Kőszegi
        - Blessed Maurice (d. 20 March 1336), Dominican friar
        - Csák II (d. before 1309), last male descendant
        - Kunigunda or Kingus (fl. 1317), married Julius II Rátót
      - (?) Michael (fl. 1270–1277), ispán of Nyitra County (according to Pál Engel)
    - Unknown daughter (fl. 1232), married Csépán II Győr
    - Csák I (fl. 1264–1270), wildgrave of Bakony (1270)
  - (?) Adam
    - Paul
      - Peter (fl. c. 1305)

=== Kisfalud branch ===
- Ugrin (d. 1204), archbishop of Esztergom, maybe son of ispán Ugrin
- Nicholas, his testament of 1231 mentions archbishop Ugrin as his pater, but more likely that he was Nicholas' uncle

=== Dobóc (Orbova) branch ===
The numbering means within the branch.

- Peter I
  - Dominic I (fl. 1262–1300), palatine for younger king Stephen (1266), possibly married N, daughter of Ivan Kőszegi
    - Nicholas (fl. 1280)
      - John ("the Red", fl. 1323)
      - Michael II (fl. 1323)
    - Stephen I ("Cimba", fl. 1280–1322)
      - Dominic II (fl. 1325–1338, d. before 1351)
        - Csala (fl. 1355)
        - Clara (fl. 1355)
        - Anna (fl. 1355–1356)
        - Bagó (fl. 1355–1356)
      - Peter III (fl. 1328–1351)
      - Stephen II (fl. 1351–1356), died without descendants
    - Peter II (fl. 1280, d. before 1308), married N, daughter of comes Ladislaus
  - Michael I (fl. 1264–1277), ispán of Veszprém County (1272)
  - Simon (fl. 1267)
  - Beers (fl. 1267)

=== Újlak branch ===
The numbering means within the branch.

- Bás I, ispán
  - Bás II
    - Csák
      - John (d. before 1324), judge royal (1311–1314)
    - Ugrin II, archbishop of Spalato (1244–1248)
  - Pous, master of the treasury for prince (1227–1233) then King Béla IV (1235), ban of Severin (1235)
    - Ugrin III (c. 1240–1311), oligarch, judge royal, Voivode of Transylvania, Ban of Szörény, Macsó, master of the treasury, master of the horse
      - Nicholas (d. 1359), judge royal (1359)
        - Ladislaus (d. before 1364), last member
  - Ugrin I (d. 1241), archbishop of Kalocsa, killed in the battle of Mohi

=== Trencsén branch ===
The numbering means within the branch.

- Matthew I (d. 1245/1249), first known member of the branch, master of the treasury (1242–1245)
  - Mark I, ispán of Hont County (1247)
    - Peter II (fl. 1279–1290)
    - Stephen II (fl. 1279–1307)
      - Mark II (fl. 1309)
      - Peter III (fl. 1309–1332; d. before 1350), master of the horse (1314–1317)
        - Ladislaus (fl. 1332)
        - Peter IV (fl. 1332)
        - Dominic (fl. 1332–1359), ancestor of the Dombai family
      - Stephen III (fl. 1323–1329)
      - Unknown daughter, married Roland III Rátót
    - Maria (fl. 1301), married Ivánka Hont-Pázmány, then Zoeardus Zoárd
    - Unknown daughter, married Jakab Cseszneky (1) and Lőrinte from the kindred Lőrinte (?)
  - Stephen I, master of the stewards (1275–1276; 1277–1278)
  - Matthew II (d. 1284), palatine, voivode of Transylvania, judge royal, ban of Slavonia, master of the treasury
    - Unknown daughter (b. 1263, fl. 1271)
  - Peter I (d. 1284), palatine, master of the stewards
    - Matthew III (1260/65 – 1321), master of the horse (1293–1296), palatine (1296–1297, 1302–1310) and master of the treasury (1310–1311)
      - Matthew IV (d. before 1318), married Gutha N
        - Matthew V, married Kunigunda
        - James
      - Unknown daughter, wife of Desoh
    - Csák (fl. 1291–1300), bearer of the sword (1293)
  - Unknown daughter, wife of Zdeslav of Sternberg and mother of Stephen the Bohemian, Lord of Trencsén (1321)

=== Kendertó branch ===
The numbering means within the branch.

- Nicholas I
  - Matthew I (fl. 1263)
    - Nicholas II (fl. 1315–1336; d. before 1367), died without male descendants
      - Matthew II (fl. 1336)
      - Ladislaus (fl. 1336)
      - Catherine (fl. 1336–1367), heir, married Demetrius Málasi
        - Nicholas III (fl. 1367), canon of Fehérvár
        - Michael (fl. 1367)
          - Anne (fl. 1398), married Francis Apáti
        - Elizabeth (fl. 1383), married Klemens, a citizen of Fehérvár
    - a possible daughter

=== Fragments ===
- Gúg I
  - Csák (fl. 1219–1246), ispán of Sopron County (1235–1240)
    - Stephen (fl. 1228–1269, d. before 1276), Ban of Severin (1243); married N Győr
      - Emeric (fl. 1272–1276), ispán of Somogy County (1272–1273)
    - Gúg II (fl. 1237–1263)
    - four other unidentified sons (fl. 1237)
