= Ladislaus II Kán =

Hungarian baron and landowner (died 1278 CE)

Ladislaus (II) Kán

Judge royal
- Reign: 1273 (twice)
- Predecessor: Alexander Karászi (1st term); Matthew Csák (2nd term)
- Successor: Matthew Csák (1st term); Nicholas Gutkeled (2nd term)
- Born: Unknown
- Died: 3 January 1278
- Noble family: gens Kán
- Spouse: unknown
- Issue: Ladislaus III; Julius; Nicholas
- Father: Ladislaus I

Ladislaus (II) from the kindred Kán (Hungarian: Kán nembeli (II.) László; died 3 January 1278) was a Hungarian baron and landowner, member of the gens Kán.

== Biography ==
He was the son of palatine Ladislaus I (d. after 1247) and an unidentified mother. He had two brothers, including prelate Nicholas, and a sister, the wife of Alexander Aba, progenitor of the Nekcsei family. One of Ladislaus' three sons from his unidentified wife was Ladislaus III, voivode of Transylvania (1295–1314) who became one of the most powerful oligarchs during the interregnum after the death of king Andrew III and ruled Transylvania de facto independently until his death in 1315.

Ladislaus II served as voivode of Transylvania (and thus head of Szolnok County) from 1263 to 1264, when the king's son, Stephen governed Transylvania independently from Béla IV, holding the title of duke of Transylvania. Ladislaus supported the efforts of duke Stephen. During the Bulgarian campaigns of Michael VIII, he led a Hungarian army in alliance with a Bulgarian magnate, Jacob Svetoslav against the re-forming Byzantine Empire. However, along with his brother Julius, he defected to Béla IV in 1264, and led a campaign through the valley of river Maros (Mureș) to invade Transylvania, nevertheless he suffered a serious defeat from the army of Peter Csák at the Fortress of Déva, which functioned as the "royal castle" of Stephen.

Because of his betrayal, he lost his full political influence after the coronation of Stephen V in 1270. This reduction in political power is demonstrated by the fact that he was able to holding an office only after the sudden death of the king, when he served as ispán (comes) of Pozsony County between 1272 and 1273. He was appointed judge royal twice in 1273, which was the second-highest secular position after the palatine. Besides that he also functioned as ispán of Baranya County, Szeben and Bánya ispánates. Between 1275 and 1276, he was the voivode of Transylvania and ispán of Szolnok County for the second term.

== Sources ==
- Engel, Pál (2001). The Realm of St Stephen: A History of Medieval Hungary, 895-1526. I.B. Tauris Publishers. ISBN 1-86064-061-3.
- (in Hungarian) Markó, László (2006). A magyar állam főméltóságai Szent Istvántól napjainkig – Életrajzi Lexikon ("The High Officers of the Hungarian State from Saint Stephen to the Present Days – A Biographical Encyclopedia") (2nd edition); Helikon Kiadó Kft., Budapest; ISBN 963-547-085-1.
- Sălăgean, Tudor (2005). "Romanian Society in the Early Middle Ages (9th–14th Centuries AD)". In: Pop, Ioan-Aurel & Bolovan, Ioan, History of Romania: Compendium. Romanian Cultural Institute (Center for Transylvanian Studies). ISBN 978-973-7784-12-4.
- (in Hungarian) Zsoldos, Attila (2011). Magyarország világi archontológiája, 1000–1301 ("Secular Archontology of Hungary, 1000–1301"). História, MTA Történettudományi Intézete. Budapest. ISBN 978-963-9627-38-3

Ladislaus II Genus Kán Born: ? Died: 3 January 1278
Political offices
Preceded by Csák Hahót	Voivode of Transylvania; 1263–1264	Succeeded by Nicholas Geregye
Preceded by Alexander Karászi	Judge royal 1273	Succeeded by Matthew Csák
Preceded by Matthew Csák	Judge royal 1273	Succeeded by Nicholas Gutkeled
Preceded by Ugrin Csák	Voivode of Transylvania; 1275–1276	Succeeded by Ugrin Csák
