= Mark I Csák =

13th-century Hungarian noble

Mark (I) Csák

Ispán of Hont
- Reign: 1247
- Predecessor: Lucas
- Successor: Peter Balassa
- Native name: Csák (I.) Márk
- Died: after 1259
- Noble family: gens Csák
- Issue: Peter II; Stephen II; Maria a daughter
- Father: Matthew I
- Mother: Margaret N

Mark (I) from the kindred Csák (Hungarian: Csák nembeli (I.) Márk; d. after 1259) was a Hungarian noble, who served as ispán (comes) of Hont County in 1247.

He was born into the Trencsén branch of the gens Csák as the eldest son of Matthew I and Margaret from an unidentified family. According to a royal charter in 1259, Mark owned Lednic, Upper Hungary (today: Lednica, Slovakia), where he built a castle. The name of the village was first mentioned here as "Lednyche". The charter refers to him as comes Mark de Lednyche. Mark had two sons (Peter II and Stephen II) and two daughters; one of them was Maria, the wife of Ivánka Hont-Pázmány, then Zoeardus Zoárd, while the other unidentified daughter married James Bána then Lőrinte II Lőrinte.

Mark's descendants remained landowners near the ancient estate of the genus, Csákvár, while his brothers, Stephen I, Matthew II and Peter I, as well as the latter's sons, Matthew III and Csák acquired possessions in the north-western counties of the Kingdom of Hungary, where later Matthew III, as the most powerful oligarch, ruled de facto independently of the king and usurped royal prerogatives on his realm.

== Sources ==
- (in Hungarian) Kristó, Gyula (1986). Csák Máté ("Matthew Csák"). Magyar História, Gondolat. Budapest. ISBN 963-281-736-2
- (in Hungarian) Zsoldos, Attila (2011). Magyarország világi archontológiája, 1000–1301 ("Secular Archontology of Hungary, 1000–1301"). História, MTA Történettudományi Intézete. Budapest. ISBN 978-963-9627-38-3

Mark I Genus Csák Born: ? Died: after 1259
Political offices
Preceded by Lucas	Ispán of Hont; 1247	Succeeded by Peter Balassa
