= Matthew I =

Matthew I may refer to:

- Matthew I Csák (fl. 1245)
- Pope Matthew I of Alexandria (r. 1378–1408)
- Matthew I of Constantinople, Ecumenical Patriarch of Constantinople from 1397 to 1410
