= Ivánka II Hont-Pázmány =

Hungarian noble

Ivánka (II) Hont-Pázmány

Judge royal
- Reign: before 1289
- Died: 1289
- Noble family: gens Hont-Pázmány
- Spouse: Maria Csák
- Father: Ivahon (Joachim)

Ivánka (II) from the kindred Hont-Pázmány (Hungarian: Hont-Pázmány nembeli (II.) Ivánka; died 1289) was a Hungarian noble in the second half of the 13th century. He served as Judge royal sometime in the 1280s.

== Family and career ==
Ivánka (II) was born into the Szeg branch of the wealthy and prestigious gens (clan) Hont-Pázmány. This branch possessed three surrounding villages in Nyitra County called Malomszeg (present-day Lipová in Slovakia), Egyházszeg and Nagyszeg (today boroughs in Šurany, Slovakia). Ivánka's father was Ivahon (also known as Joachim or "Ivan de Szeg"). During the 1271 Hungarian–Bohemian War, Ivahon was captured when the army of Ottokar II of Bohemia besieged and occupied Nyitra Castle (Nitra), where Ivahon was among the defenders. Simultaneously, his lordship of Szeg was plundered and looted by the Bohemian troops. After his release following Ottokar's defeat, he was granted the village of Devecse (later Divékújfalu, present-day Diviacka Nová Ves in Slovakia) by Stephen V of Hungary for his loyal service and damage suffered still in that year.

It is plausible that Ivahon died soon, because Ivánka requested the newly crowned Ladislaus IV of Hungary to confirm the aforementioned land donation in 1272. Ivánka fought against the Bohemians in 1273, who again invaded the Kingdom of Hungary. He was present and seriously injured, when the Hungarian army recaptured Szombathely in August. He also participated in the successful military campaigns against Ottokar at Győr and Laa thereafter. He was granted the estate of Halla in Nyitra Country for his merits.

== Positions ==
Ivánka married Maria Csák, the daughter of Mark Csák, who belonged to the Trencsén branch of the powerful gens Csák. As a result, when various baronial groups fought for the supreme power in the first regnal years of the minor Ladislaus IV, Ivánka supported the Csáks' political orientation (his brother-in-law was Stephen II Csák). He served as ispán of Fejér County in 1275. It is presumable that he is also identical with that "Joanca", who held the office of ispán of Nyitra County in 1281. According to a charter issued by vice-judge royal Stephen in 1299 or 1300, Ivánka formerly served as Judge royal as he was referred to as ""quondam iudex curie domini regis". As Ivánka compiled his last will and testament on his deathbed in 1289, he held the dignity sometime before that, plausibly in the 1280s. There are larger gaps in the list of office-holders in the periods 1281–1283 and 1285–1288. His wife, Maria Csák was still alive and referred to as his "widow" in November 1301. She was the wife of Zoeardus from the gens Zoárd by then.

== Sources ==
- Karácsonyi, János (1901). A magyar nemzetségek a XIV. század közepéig. II. kötet [The Hungarian genera until the middle of the 14th century, Vol. 2] (in Hungarian). Hungarian Academy of Sciences.
- Zsoldos, Attila (2011). Magyarország világi archontológiája, 1000–1301 [Secular Archontology of Hungary, 1000–1301] (in Hungarian). História, MTA Történettudományi Intézete. ISBN 978-963-9627-38-3.
