= Matthew III Csák =

Hungarian nobleman (c. 1260–1321)

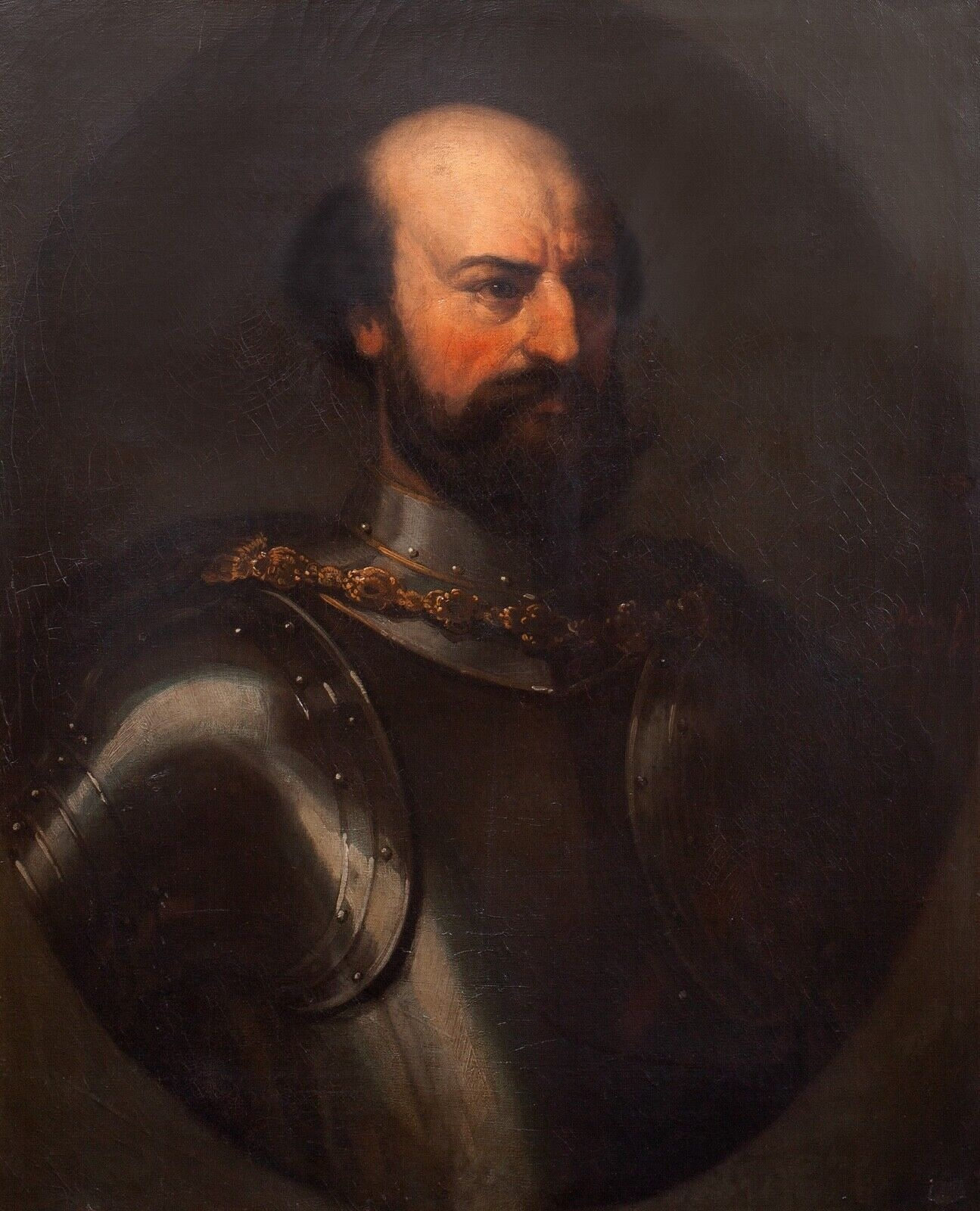
- 16th century portrait of Matthew III, attributed to Italian painter Titian

Palatine of Hungary
- Reign: 1296–1297; 1302–1309
- Predecessor: Nicholas I Kőszegi (1st term); Stephen Ákos (2nd term)
- Successor: Amade Aba &; Nicholas I Kőszegi (1st term); James Borsa (2nd term)
- Native name: Csák (III.) Máté
- Born: between 1260 and 1265
- Died: 18 March 1321 (aged 56–61)
- Noble family: gens Csák
- Issue: Matthew IV; 1 daughter
- Father: Peter I
- Mother: Unknown

Máté Csák or Matthew III Csák (between 1260 and 1265 – 18 March 1321; Hungarian: Csák (III.) Máté, Slovak: Matúš Čák III), also Máté Csák of Trencsén (Hungarian: trencséni Csák (III.) Máté, Slovak: Matúš Čák Trenčiansky), was a Hungarian oligarch who ruled de facto independently the north-western counties of Kingdom of Hungary (today roughly the western half of present-day Slovakia and parts of Northern Hungary). He held several of the highest royal offices in the kingdom, serving as Master of the Horse (főlovászmester) (1293–1296), Palatine (nádor) (1296–1297, 1302–1309), and Master of the Treasury (tárnokmester) (1309–1311). During the Hungarian succession crisis that followed the extinction of the House of Árpád in the male line, he was able to maintain his rule over his territories even after his defeat at the Battle of Rozgony against King Charles I of Hungary. In the 19th century, he was often described as a symbol of the struggle for independence in both the Hungarian and Slovak literatures.

== Early years ==
He was a son of the Palatine Peter I Csák, a member of the Hungarian genus ("clan") Csák. Hungarian medieval chronicles identified Szabolcs, the second captain of the Hungarians, as the ancestor of the Csák kindred. Around 1283, Matthew and his brother, Csák, who later served as bearer of the sword (kardhordó) in 1293, inherited their father's possessions, Komárom (Slovak: Komárno) and Szenic (Slovak: Senica). At about that time, they also inherited their uncles' (Matthew II and Stephen I Csák) possessions around Nagytapolcsány (Slovak: Veľké Topoľčany, now Topoľčany), Hrussó (Slovak: Hrušovo) and Tata. Their father had started to expand his influence over the territories that surrounded his possessions.

Matthew was born around 1260s. A diploma recorded his lameness which caused by either birth defect or a result of a war injury. He was presumably first mentioned by a charter issued by the Somogyvár Abbey on 5 August 1284, where the sons of the late Peter were summoned in a case of land title rights to Kötcse. Historian Gyula Kristó argues that the document mentions the possible elder brothers of Matthew and Csák as they first appeared in contemporary sources only in 1291. Following Peter's death, the members of the rival Kőszegi family from the Héder clan strengthened in Pozsony and Sopron Counties taking advantage of that the Csák clan has been weakened due to the death of Matthew II and Peter I. The Kőszegis defeated the local Osl clan in Sopron County and also forged ahead to Pozsony County where captured Pozsony Castle for a short time.

== King Andrew's partisan ==
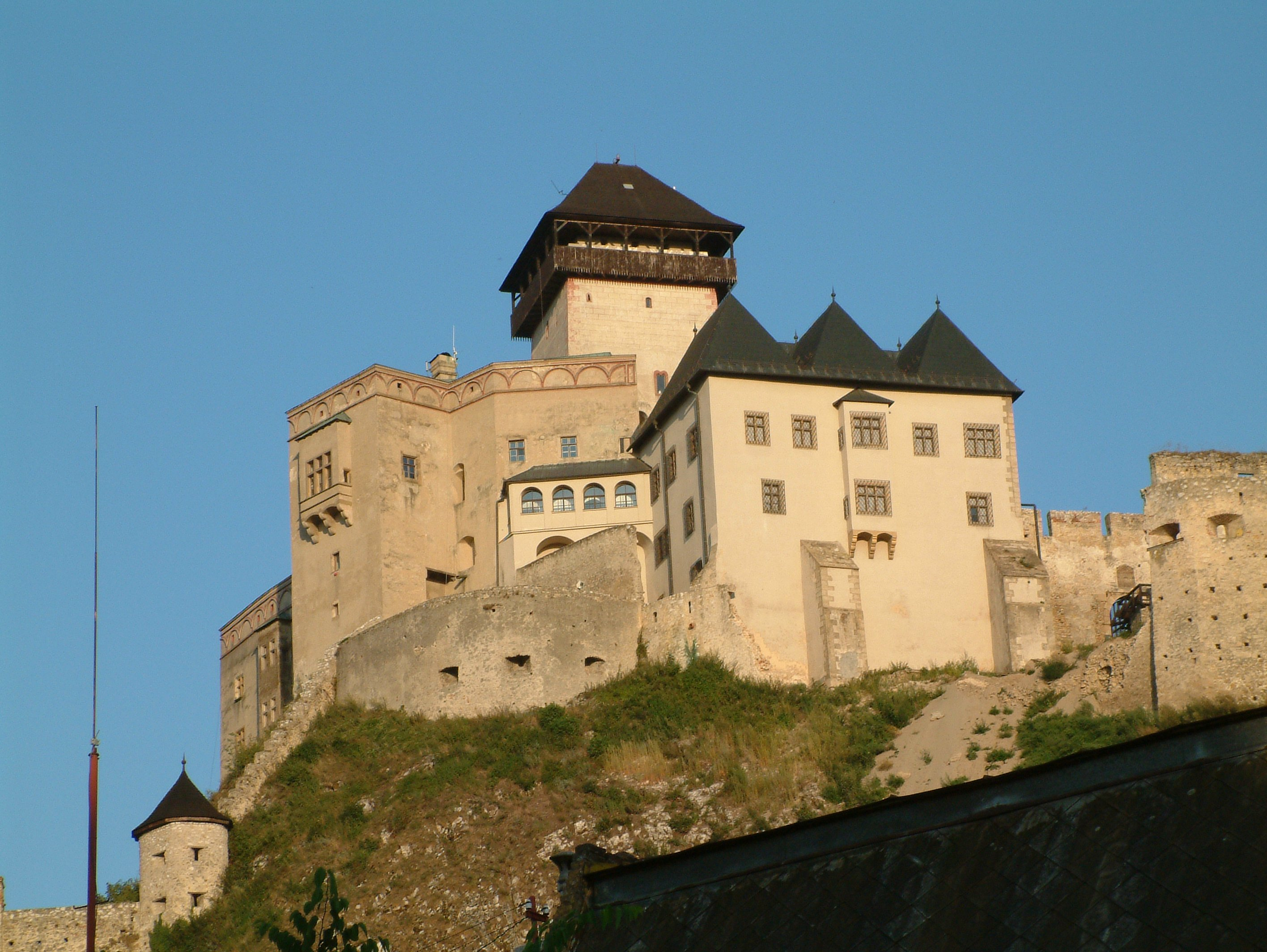
Trenčín (Trencsén) Castle with Matthew's Tower

In 1291, Matthew took part in the campaign of King Andrew III of Hungary against Austria. In the next year, when Nicholas I Kőszegi rebelled against King Andrew III and occupied Pozsony (German: Pressburg, Slovak: Prešporok, today Bratislava) and Detrekő (Slovak Plavecké Podhradie), Matthew managed to reoccupy the castles on behalf of the king. Henceforward, the Danube became the border between the developing domains of the Kőszegi and Csák families. King Andrew appointed him to master of the horse and he also became the ispán (comes) of Pozsony County (1293–1297). On 28 October 1293, Matthew issued a charter and promised that he would respect the liberties of the burghers of the city of Pozsony that King Andrew had confirmed before.

During this period, Matthew started to augment his possessions not only by the king's donations, but also by using force. In 1296, he bought Vöröskő (Slovak: Červený Kameň) from its former holders for money; however, contemporary documents prove that he enforced several neighboring landowners to transfer their possessions either to him or his partisans. He even was ready to occupy territories; e.g., around 1296, he took possession of the lands of the Archabbot of Pannonhalma south of the Danube and he also trespassed the possessions of the Collegiate Chapter of Pressburg.

Around the end of 1296, Matthew acquired Trencsén (Slovak: Trenčín) and afterwards, he was named after the castle. In 1296 King Andrew appointed him Palatine, but shortly afterwards the king absolved one of Matthew's opponents, Andrew of Gimes from the Hont-Pázmány clan of all responsibility for the damage he had caused to Matthew. The document proves that the relationship of the king and Matthew worsened and the king deprived him of his office of Palatine in 1297. At the same time, the king granted Pozsony County to his queen, Agnes of Austria.

== Kings' rival ==
Matthew continued to style himself Palatine even after 1297. He managed to overcome Andrew of Gimes and his family and thus expanded his influence along the Zsitva River (Žitava River).

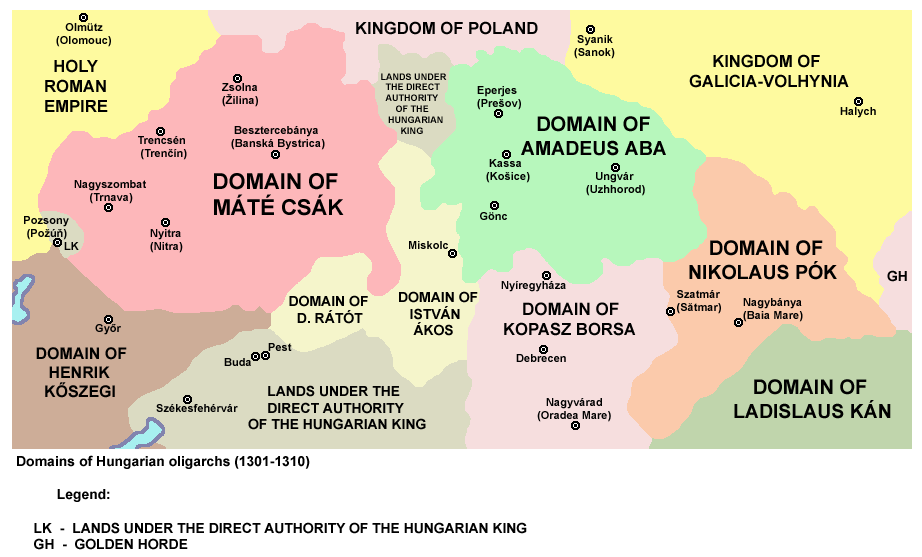
Domain of Matthew Csák

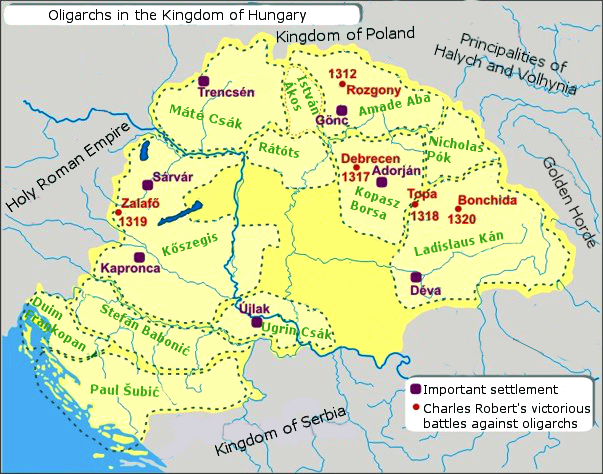
The provinces ruled by the "oligarchs" (powerful lords) in the early 14th century

In 1298, King Andrew III allied himself with King Wenceslaus II of Bohemia; the alliance was probably directed against Matthew whose possessions lay between the two monarchs' territories. In the next year, King Andrew sent his troops against him, but he could resist the attack; only Pozsony County was reoccupied by the king's partisans.

Before 1300, Matthew entered into negotiations with the representatives of King Charles II of Naples and reassured him that he would assist the claim of his grandson, Charles for the throne against King Andrew III. However, in the summer of 1300, Matthew visited Andrew's court, but the king, the last male member of the Árpád dynasty, died on 14 January 1301, and following his death a rivalry broke out among the several claimants for the throne. At that time, Matthew's brother, Csák died childless and therefore Matthew inherited his possessions.

Following the death of King Andrew III, he became the Neapolitan prince's follower, but shortly afterwards, he joined the party that offered the crown to Wenceslaus, the son of King Wenceslaus II of Bohemia. He was present at the coronation of the young Bohemian prince (27 August 1301) who granted him Trencsén and Nyitra counties; therefore he became the lawful holder of all the royal castles and possessions in the two counties. In the following years, Matthew Csák occupied the possessions of the Balassa family in the two counties and he also took several castles in Nógrád and Hont counties.

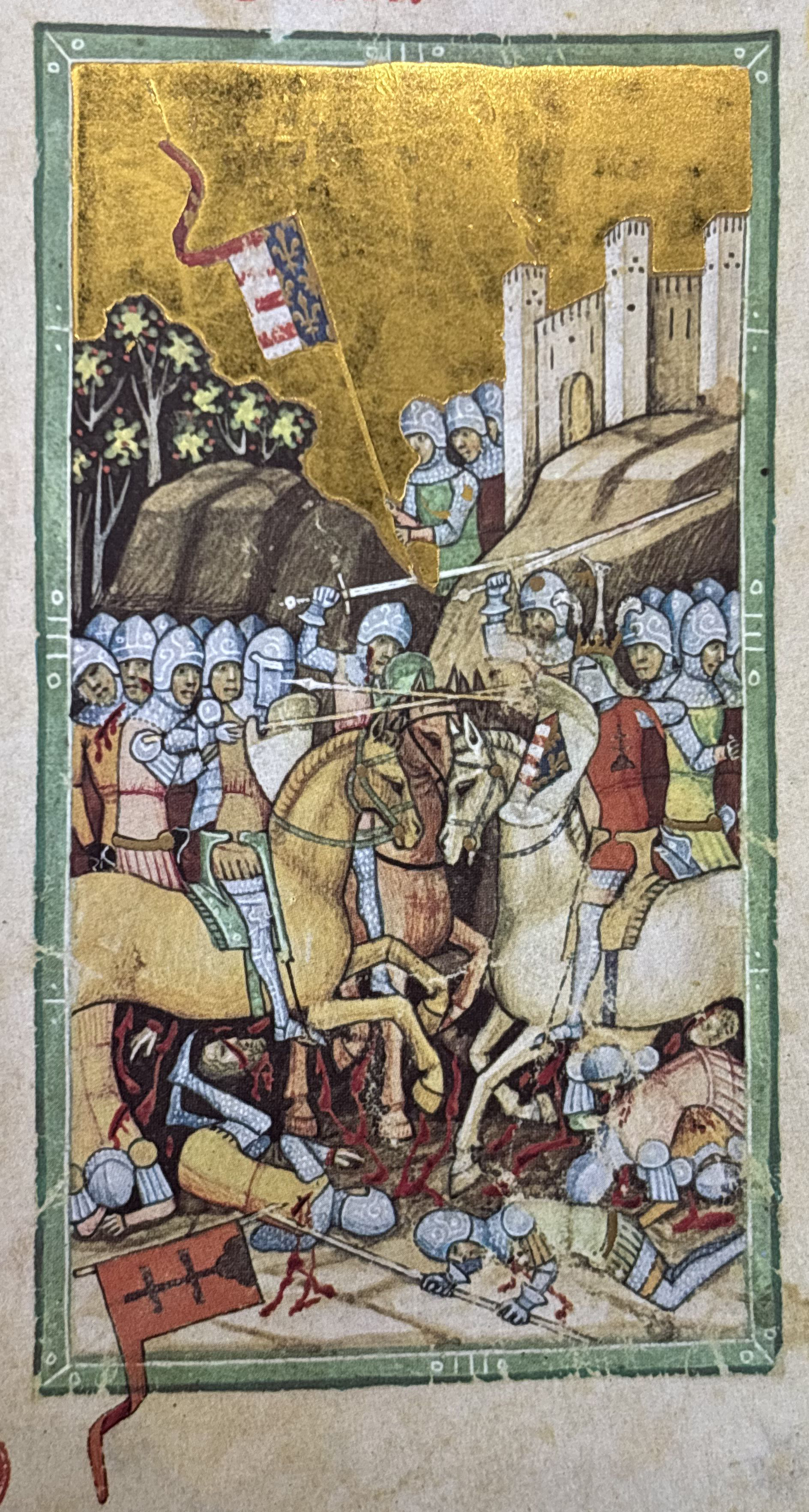
Battle of Rozgony in 1312, Chronicon Pictum from 1360

King Wenceslaus could not strengthen his rule against his opponent and he had to leave the kingdom (August 1304). By that time Matthew Csák had already left King Wenceslaus' party, and shortly afterwards he made an alliance with Duke Rudolph III of Austria against the king of Bohemia. Although he did not join to King Charles' partisans, but his troops took part in the campaign King Charles and Duke Rudolph lead against the Kingdom of Bohemia (September–October 1304). The internal struggles, however, did not end, because on 6 December 1305 a new claimant, Otto III, Duke of Bavaria was crowned King of Hungary. Matthew Csák did not accept King Otto's rule, and his troops struggled together with King Charles' armies who occupied some castles on the northern part of the kingdom.

On 10 October 1307, an assembly confirmed King Charles' rule, but Matthew Csák and some other oligarchs (Ladislaus Kán, Ivan and Henry II Kőszegi) absented themselves from the assembly. In 1308, Pope Clement V sent a legate to the kingdom in order to strengthen King Charles' position. The legate, Cardinal Gentile Portino da Montefiore managed to persuade Matthew to accept King Charles' rule at their meeting in the Pauline Monastery of Kékes (10 November 1308). Although Matthew himself was not present at the following assembly (27 November) in Pest where King Charles' reign was again confirmed, he sent his envoy to attend at the meeting. Shortly afterwards, King Charles appointed Matthew Palatine of the kingdom. However, at the new coronation of King Charles (15 June 1309), he was only represented by one of his followers. In the next year, King Charles appointed him to the office of master of the treasury, which then was the first high-ranking political position during the first regnal years of Charles as the position of palatine was "devaluated".

Matthew Csák did not want to accept the king's rule; therefore, he did not attend King Charles' third coronation, when he was crowned with the Holy Crown of Hungary (27 August). Moreover, Matthew Csák still continued to expand the borders of his domains and occupied several castles in the northern part of the kingdom. On 25 June 1311, he led his troops towards Buda and pillaged the surrounding territories and on this account the Cardinal Gentile excommunicated him on 6 July 1311. However, he did not accept the punishment and persuaded some priests to continue their services on his territories.

The indignant oligarch pillaged the possessions of the Archdiocese of Esztergom. When the citizens of Kassa (Slovak: Košice) killed Amade Aba, the powerful oligarch of the north-eastern parts of the kingdom (5 September 1311) Matthew made an alliance with his sons against the king who sided with Kassa. His troops liberated Sáros Castle (Slovak: Šarišský hrad), besieged by the king, and then marched against Kassa. At the Battle of Rozgony, the king's armies defeated Matthew's and his allies' troops (15 June 1312). Following the battle, the king occupied the territories of Amade Aba's sons. Although Matthew's domain stayed undisturbed, the occupation of the neighboring territories by the king hindered his expansion.

== Last years ==
In 1314, the king's armies invaded Matthew Csák's domain, but they could not occupy it. In the meantime, Matthew occupied some fortresses in the March of Moravia and therefore King John of Bohemia also invaded his territories (May 1315). The Czech armies defeated his troops (whom he encouraged in Hungarian language) at Holics but they could not occupy the fortress. King Charles also invaded Matthew's domain and occupied Visegrád.

Charles I launched small campaigns against the Csák dominion during 1314 and 1315. When Matthew invaded Szepes and his troops plundered the region, he was narrowly defeated by Philip Drugeth, the king's loyal soldier. During this time Thomas Szécsényi received Hollókő from Charles, who confiscated the land from the Kacsics clan, the disloyal relatives of Thomas. Charles gradually encircled the Csák dominion, when appointed loyal castellans to head of the nearby forts.

The king attempted to weaken the unity among Matthew's partisans through diplomatic means. According to a royal charter issued in September 1315, Charles I stripped three of the oligarch's servients of all their possessions and gave those to Palatine Dominic Rátót, because they absolutely supported all Matthew Csák's efforts and did not ask for the king's grace. One of these sanctioned nobles was Felician Záh, who later unsuccessfully attempted to assassinate the entire royal family in 1330.

In 1316, some of his former followers rebelled against Matthew, and although he occupied their castle at Jókő, some of them left his domain. In 1317, he invaded the possessions of the Diocese of Nyitra, and his troops occupied and pillaged its see. As a consequence, Bishop John excommunicated him and his followers again.

The king's armies continued to invade his territories and occupied Sirok and Fülek (Fiľakovo), but Matthew could maintain his rule over his territories until his death.

== Domain ==
Matthew Csák's domain had been developing gradually before the Battle of Rozgony, and it reached its greatest territorial extent around 1311. By that time, 14 counties of the kingdom, and about 50 castles were under his and his followers' rule.

Around 1297, he organized his own court, similar to the king's court and he usurped royal prerogatives on his domains, similarly to other oligarchs (e.g., Amade Aba, Nicholas Kőszegi) of the beginning of the 14th century. Thus he became the de facto ruler of his domain and he made alliances independently of the king. He refused to accept appeals to the king against his decisions and he denied to put claimants in possession of lands the king had granted them on his territories. Although some of the local landowners did not want to accept Matthew's supremacy, but sooner or later, they had to leave their possessions.

Following his death, his cousin Stephen Sternberg (or Stephen the Bohemian) became the lord of his domain, because his son (Matthew IV) had died and his grandsons (Matthew V and James) were still minors at the time of his death in 1321. However, Stephen Sternberg could not resist the king's invasion and Matthew Csák's former domain was overtaken by the king's armies in a few months' time.

== Legacy in the Slovak romantic movement ==
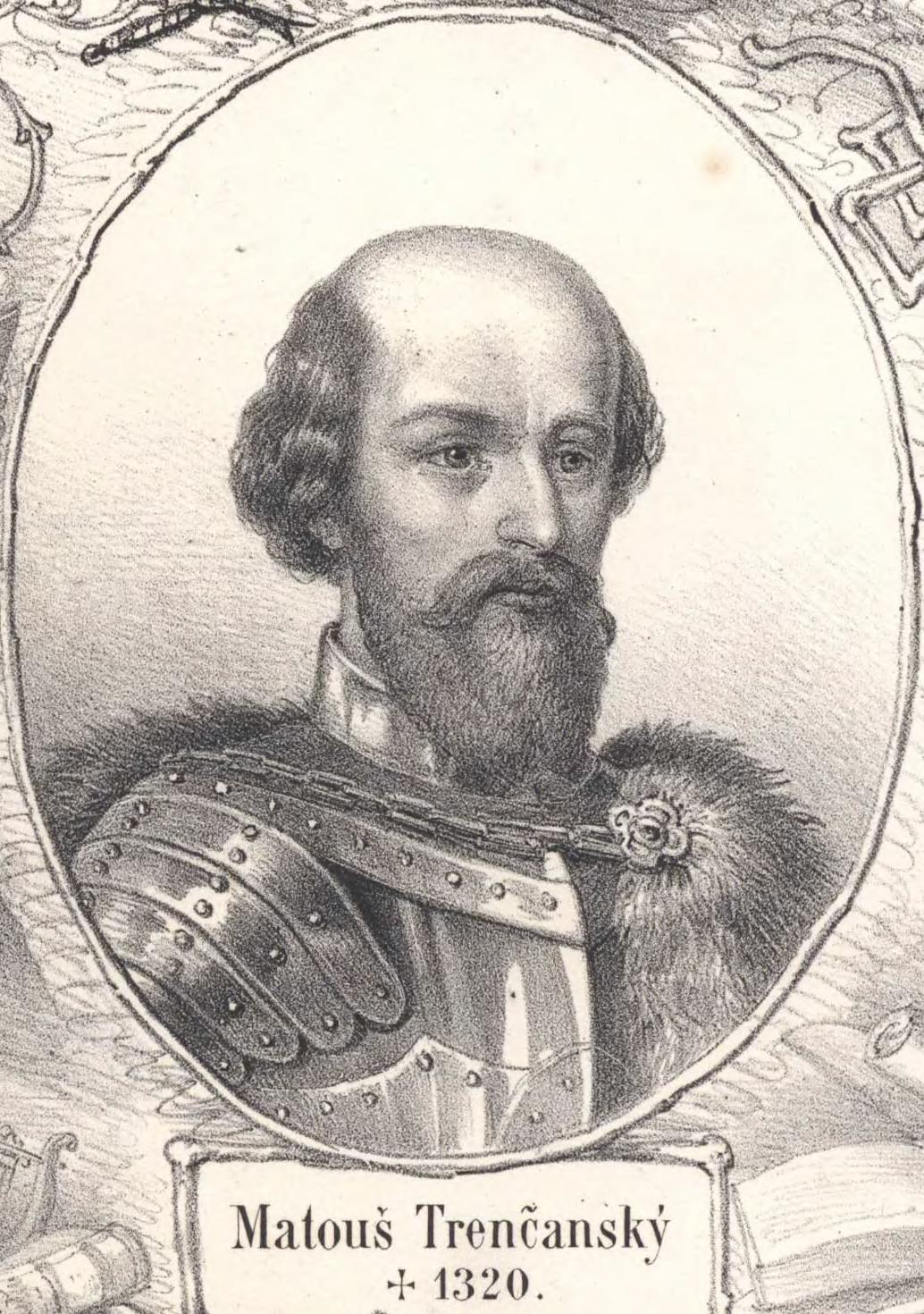
Matthew III Csák, lithography probably by Roland Weibezahl (1817–1871)

Matthew Csák significantly influenced regional history of today's Slovakia in the 13th–14th centuries. Alongside other activities, he founded several new settlements mainly in Trencsén County and supported raising towns. Regardless of his relatively short rule his (ex-)domain was called the Matthew's Land (terra Matthei) already in the 14th century. This concept had been preserved until the 15th century, when individuals still used to claim their origin from the Matthew's Land (de Terra Matthei) instead of the official administrative divisions or settlements of the Kingdom of Hungary.

This was later reflected in the Slovak national revival in the 19th century. Although his personality was known to older generation of Slovak intellects (Adam František Kollár, Anton Bernolák), he became a subject of the national mythology only in the period of Ľudovít Štúr. The motive of Matthew Csák was introduced in 1836–37 by a Slovak lawyer Alexander Boleslavín Vrchovský. Thereafter, the topic was covered by numerous Slovak poets and writers like Ľudovít Štúr, Ján Kalinčiak, Jozef Miloslav Hurban, Mikuláš Dohány, Viliam Paulíny-Tóth, Samuel Ornis, Jonáš Záborský, Jozef Škultéty and others. In the romantic national discourse of the 19th century, he was perceived as a Slovak national hero, defender of Slovak interests and/or an uncrowned Slovak king. Matthew Csák and his "realm" became the symbols of Slovak independence with the purpose to expropriate his historical heritage for the emerging national state of Slovakia. Ľudovít Štúr, the most prominent personality in the period of the Slovak national revival presented Matthew Csák in his poem Matúš z Trenčína ("Matúš of Trenčín") as champion of Slovak interests who build on legacy of Great Moravia, predicting that the Slovak nation "will be free one day".

This view was primarily held by a relatively narrow group of Slovak intellectuals. By the second half of the 19th century and the early 20th century there was a growing trend to question Matthew Csák as a Slovak national hero from individuals like Jonáš Záborský and Július Botto. By 1923, Slovak historiography definitively rejected this viewpoint through Slovak historian Jozef Škultéty. Similar views are also rejected by modern Slovak historiography. In Slovak historical memory Matthew Csák is perceived simply as a feudal magnate, a notable regional figure and the "Lord of Váh and Tatras".

Matúš Čák was hardly a Slovak patriot as some 19th century historians have claimed. He pursued the ordinary goals of a Hungarian magnate and never did establish a sufficiently well-defined territory or political organization to support any Slovak claims to a heritage.

— Anton Špiesz, Dušan Čaplovič, Ladislaus J. Bolchazy; Illustrated Slovak history: a struggle for sovereignty in Central Europe (2006).

== See also ==
- Beckov Castle – owned and fortified by Matthew Csák
- Amade Aba – oligarch who ruled de facto independently the northern and north-eastern counties of the Kingdom of Hungary
- Ladislaus Kán – oligarch who governed de facto independently the Transylvanian parts of the Kingdom of Hungary

== Sources ==
- Engel, Pál (1988). "Az ország újraegyesítése. I. Károly küzdelmei az oligarchák ellen (1310–1323) [Reunification of the Realm. The Struggles of Charles I Against the Oligarchs (1310–1323)]". Századok (in Hungarian). 122 (1–2). Magyar Történelmi Társulat: 89–146. ISSN 0039-8098.
- Engel, Pál (1996). Magyarország világi archontológiája, 1301–1457, I [Secular Archontology of Hungary, 1301–1457, Volume I] (in Hungarian). História, MTA Történettudományi Intézete. ISBN 963-8312-44-0.
- Engel, Pál (2001). The Realm of St Stephen: A History of Medieval Hungary, 895–1526. I.B. Tauris Publishers. ISBN 1-86064-061-3.
- Fügedi, Erik (1986). Ispánok, bárók, kiskirályok [Ispáns, Barons and Petty Kings] (in Hungarian). Magvető. ISBN 963-14-0582-6.
- Kristó, Gyula (1973). Csák Máté tartományúri hatalma [The Provincial Lordship of Matthew Csák] (in Hungarian). Akadémiai Kiadó.
- Kristó, Gyula (1979). A feudális széttagolódás Magyarországon [Feudal Anarchy in Hungary] (in Hungarian). Akadémiai Kiadó. ISBN 963-05-1595-4.
- Kristó, Gyula (1986). Csák Máté [Matthew Csák] (in Hungarian). Gondolat Kiadó. ISBN 963-281-736-2.
- Kristó, Gyula (1999). "I. Károly király főúri elitje (1301–1309) [The Aristocratic Elite of King Charles I, 1301–1309]". Századok (in Hungarian). 133 (1). Magyar Történelmi Társulat: 41–62. ISSN 0039-8098.
- Kristó, Gyula (2003). "I. Károly király harcai a tartományurak ellen (1310–1323) [The Struggles of Charles I Against the Oligarchs (1310–1323)]". Századok (in Hungarian). 137 (2). Magyar Történelmi Társulat: 297–347. ISSN 0039-8098.
- Macho, Peter (2012). "Matúš Čák Trenčiansky v diele Ľudovíta Štúra". In Mihalkovičová, Beáta (ed.). Nové kontexty života a diela Ľudovíta Štúra:Zborník z vedeckého seminára konaného v dňoch 28. a 29. októbra 2010 v Modre (in Slovak). Modra: Modranská muzeálna spoločnosť. ISBN 978-80-224-1532-3.
- Markó, László (2006). A magyar állam főméltóságai Szent Istvántól napjainkig: Életrajzi Lexikon [Great Officers of State in Hungary from King Saint Stephen to Our Days: A Biographical Encyclopedia] (in Hungarian). Helikon Kiadó. ISBN 963-208-970-7.
- Rácz, György (2018). "The Heraldry of Angevin-age Hungary and its Reflections in the Illuminated Chronicle". In Bak, János M.; Veszprémy, László (eds.). Studies on the Illuminated Chronicle. Budapest: Central European University Press, National Széchényi Library. pp. 111–126. ISBN 978-963-386-261-2. ISSN 1419-7782.
- Szőcs, Tibor (2014). A nádori intézmény korai története, 1000–1342 [An Early History of the Palatinal Institution: 1000–1342] (in Hungarian). Magyar Tudományos Akadémia Támogatott Kutatások Irodája. ISBN 978-963-508-697-9.
- Szűcs, Jenő (2002). Az utolsó Árpádok [The Last Árpáds] (in Hungarian). Osiris Kiadó. ISBN 963-389-271-6.
- Zsoldos, Attila (2011a). Magyarország világi archontológiája, 1000–1301 [Secular Archontology of Hungary, 1000–1301] (in Hungarian). História, MTA Történettudományi Intézete. ISBN 978-963-9627-38-3.
- Zsoldos, Attila (2011b). "III. András hat nádora [The Six Palatines of Andrew III]". In Cabello, Juan; C. Tóth, Norbert (eds.). Erősségénél fogva várépítésre való: Tanulmányok a 70 éves Németh Péter tiszteletére [It is Very Well Placed for a Castle: Studies for the 70-year-old Péter Németh] (in Hungarian). Szabolcs-Szatmár-Bereg Megyei Önkormányzat Múzeumok Igazgatósága. pp. 289–299. ISBN 978-963-7220-75-3.
- Zsoldos, Attila (2012). "Hűséges oligarchák [Loyal Oligarchs]". In Baráth, Magdolna; Molnár, Antal (eds.). A történettudomány szolgálatában: Tanulmányok a 70 éves Gecsényi Lajos tiszteletére (in Hungarian). Magyar Országos Levéltár. pp. 347–354. ISBN 978-963-7228-34-6.
- Zsoldos, Attila (2013). "Kings and Oligarchs in Hungary at the Turn of the Thirteenth and Fourteenth Centuries". Hungarian Historical Review. 2 (2): 211–242. ISSN 2063-8647.

Matthew III Genus Csák Born: between 1260 and 1265 Died: 18 March 1321
Political offices
Preceded by Thomas Hont-Pázmány	Master of the horse 1293–1296	Succeeded by John Csák
Preceded by Apor Péc	Ispán of Pozsony; 1293–1297	Succeeded by Demetrius Balassa
Preceded by Nicholas I Kőszegi	Palatine of Hungary alongside Amadeus Aba in 1296; 1296–1297	Succeeded by Amadeus Aba; Nicholas I Kőszegi
Preceded by Stephen Ákos	Palatine of Hungary alongside others 1302–1309	Succeeded by James Borsa
Preceded by Ugrin Csák	Master of the treasury 1309–1311	Succeeded by Nicholas III Kőszegi
