= Padáň =

Padáň Padány
- Municipality
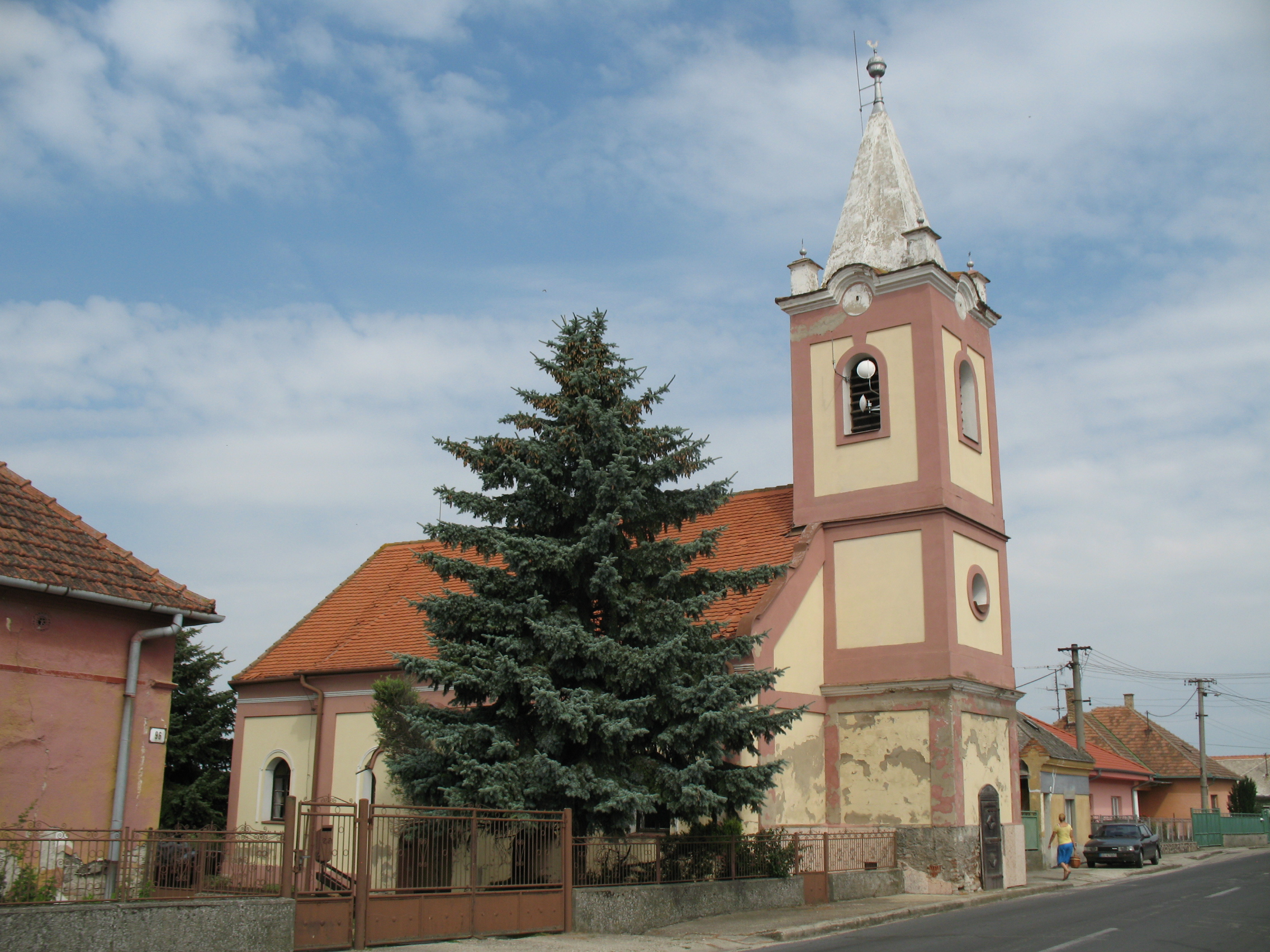

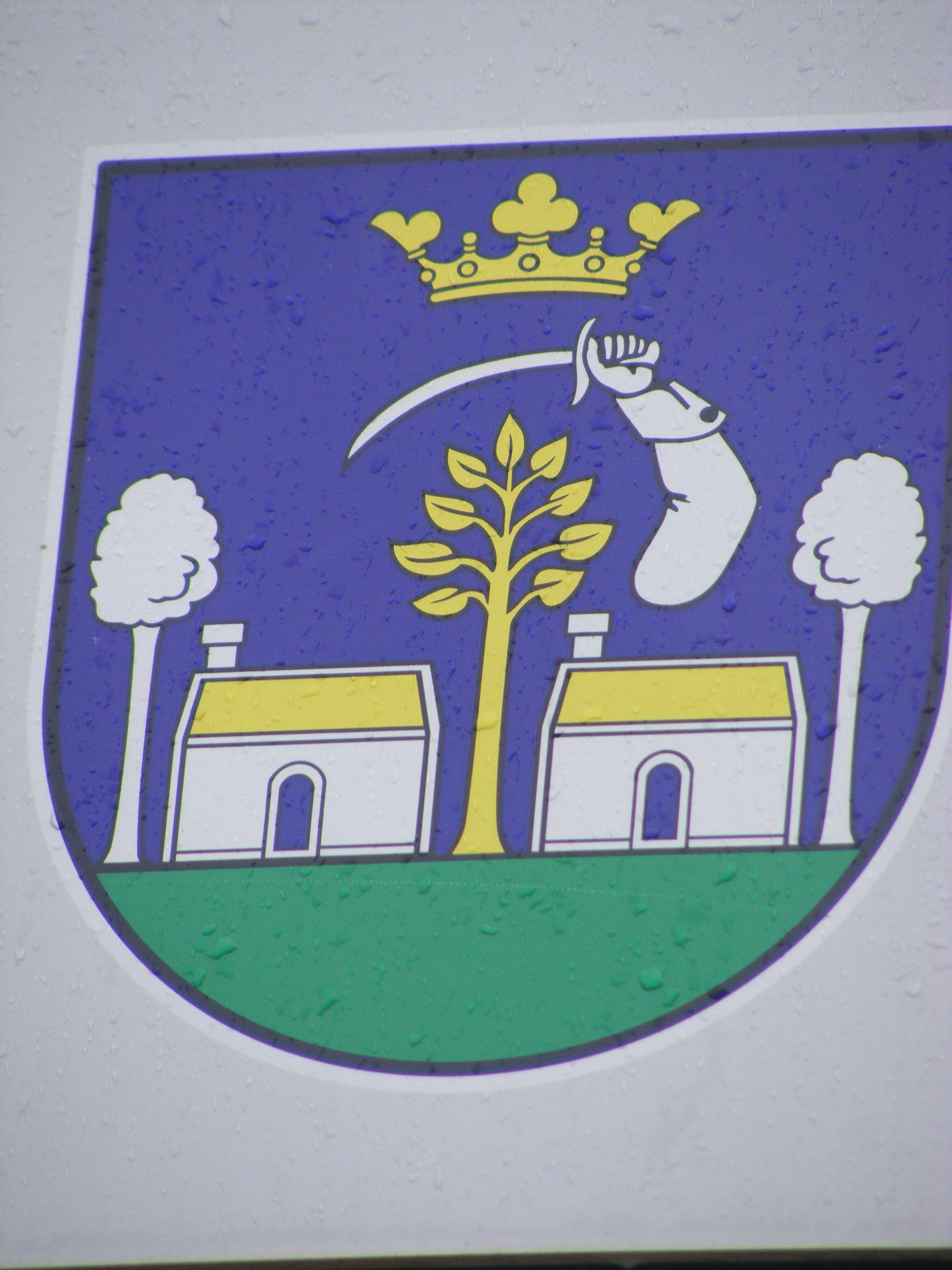
- Flag Coat of arms

- Location of Padáň in the Trnava Region Location of Padáň in Slovakia
- Coordinates: 47.93°N 17.67°E
- Country: Slovakia
- Region: Trnava Region
- District: Dunajská Streda District
- First mentioned: 1254

Government
  - Mayor: Zoltán Szabó (Most-Híd)

Area
  - Total: 17.00 km^{2} (6.56 sq mi)
- Elevation: 113 m (371 ft)

Population (2025)
  - Total: 876

Ethnicity
  - Hungarians: 94.44%
  - Slovaks: 5.21%
- Time zone: UTC+1 (CET)
  - Summer (DST): UTC+2 (CEST)
- Postal code: 930 09
- Area code: +421 31
- Vehicle registration plate (until 2022): DS
- Website: padan.sk

Padáň (Hungarian: Padány, pronounced [ˈpɒdaːɲ]) is a village and municipality in the Dunajská Streda District in the Trnava Region of south-west Slovakia.

== Geography ==
The municipality lies at an altitude of 113 metres (371 ft) and covers an area of 17.00 km^{2} (6.56 sq mi) (2025).

== History ==
The village was first recorded in 1254 as Padan, an old Pecheneg settlement. On the territory of the village, there used to be Petény village as well, which was mentioned in 1298 as the appurtenance of Pressburg Castle. Until the end of World War I, it was part of Hungary and fell within the Dunaszerdahely district of Pozsony County. After the Austro-Hungarian army disintegrated in November 1918, Czechoslovak troops occupied the area. After the Treaty of Trianon of 1920, the village became officially part of Czechoslovakia. In November 1938, the First Vienna Award granted the area to Hungary and it was held by Hungary until 1945. After Soviet occupation in 1945, Czechoslovak administration returned and the village became officially part of Czechoslovakia in 1947.

== Population ==
Population statistic (10 years)
Year	1995	2005	2015	2025
Count	772	881	889	876
Difference		+14.11%	+0.90%	−1.46%

Population statistic
Year	2024	2025
Count	889	876
Difference		−1.46%

It has a population of 876 people (31 December 2025).

=== Ethnicity ===
Census 2021 (1+ %)
Ethnicity	Number	Fraction
Hungarian	780	85.52%
Slovak	147	16.11%
Not found out	37	4.05%
Total	912	

In year 2021 was 912 people by ethnicity 780 as Hungarian, 147 as Slovak, 37 as Not found out, 3 as Czech, 3 as Romani, 1 as Ukrainian and 1 as French.

Note on population: The difference values of population numbers in the table "Population statistic" and in the sections "Ethnicity" & "Religion" is caused by the use of various statistical methods.

=== Religion ===
Census 2021 (1+ %)
Religion	Number	Fraction
Calvinist Church	348	38.16%
Roman Catholic Church	341	37.39%
None	164	17.98%
Not found out	22	2.41%
Evangelical Church	16	1.75%
Total	912	

In year 2021 was 912 people by religion 348 from Calvinist Church, 341 from Roman Catholic Church, 164 from None, 22 from Not found out, 16 from Evangelical Church, 9 from Greek Catholic Church, 3 from Old Catholic Church, 3 from Other and not ascertained christian church, 3 from Christian Congregations in Slovakia, 1 from Eastern Orthodox Church, 1 from Paganism and natural spirituality and 1 from Other.
