= Diviacka Nová Ves =

- Municipality
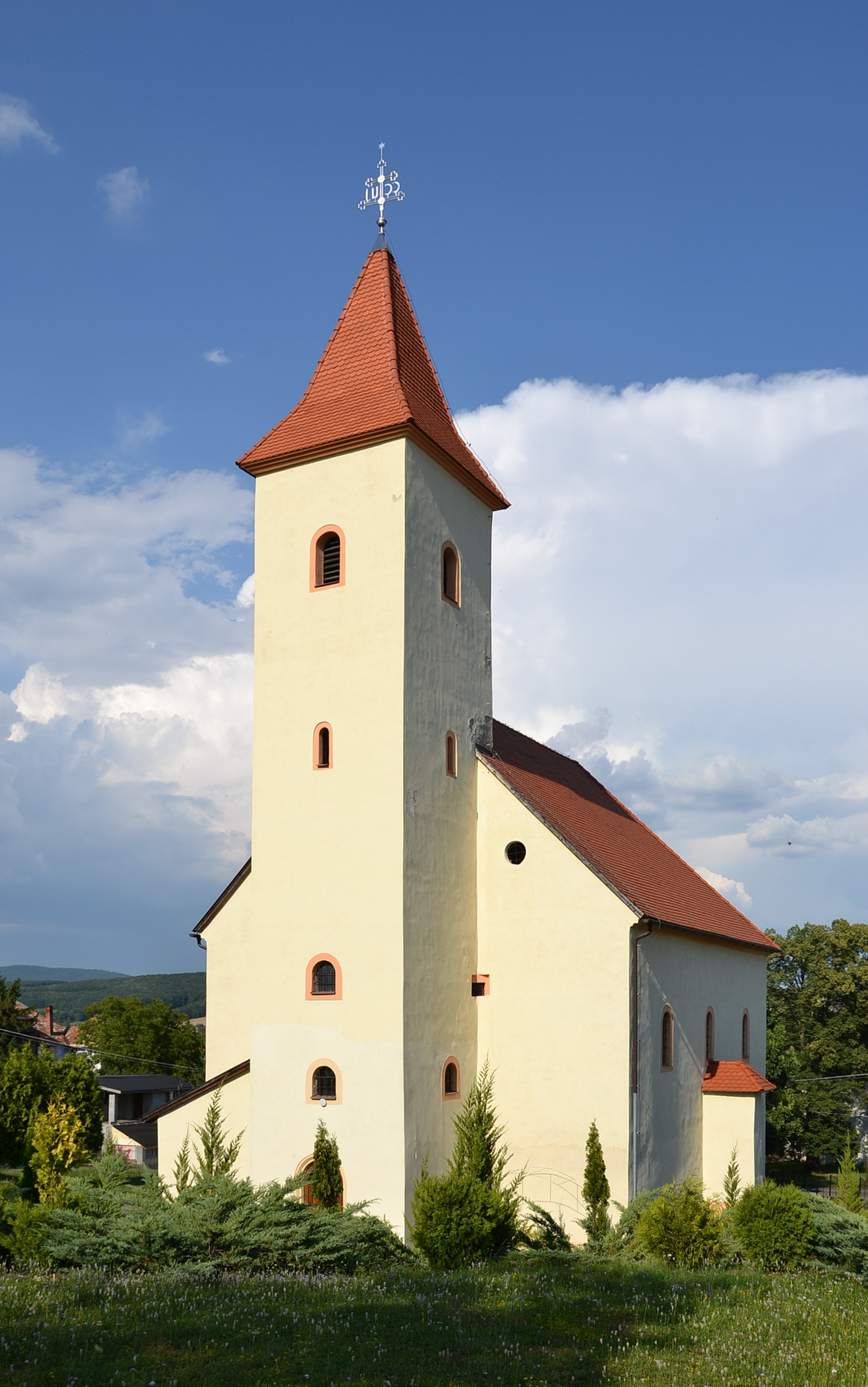

- Flag

- Location of Diviacka Nová Ves in the Trenčín Region Location of Diviacka Nová Ves in Slovakia
- Coordinates: 48.75°N 18.50°E
- Country: Slovakia
- Region: Trenčín Region
- District: Prievidza District
- First mentioned: 1270

Area
  - Total: 13.36 km^{2} (5.16 sq mi)
- Elevation: 266 m (873 ft)

Population (2025)
  - Total: 1,752
- Time zone: UTC+1 (CET)
  - Summer (DST): UTC+2 (CEST)
- Postal code: 972 24
- Area code: +421 46
- Vehicle registration plate (until 2022): PD

Diviacka Nová Ves (Hungarian: Divékújfalu, German: Divickneudorf) is a village and municipality in Prievidza District in the Trenčín Region of western Slovakia.

== History ==
In historical records the village was first mentioned in 1270.

Diviacka Nova Ves is located in Prievidza, SE of Trencin. The last Jewish burial was in 1928. The urban isolated crown of a hill has no sign or marker. Reached by turning directly off a public road, access is open to all via a broken masonry wall without gate. 20-100 19th-20th century marble, granite, and sandstone tombstones, in original locations, are flat shaped tombstones or finely smoothed and inscribed stones with Hebrew and German inscriptions. The property is used for a garden. Adjacent properties are gardens. Private visitors stop rarely. Erosion and vandalism are moderate threats. Weather erosion is a minor threat.

== Geography ==
The municipality lies at an altitude of 266 metres (873 ft) and covers an area of 13.36 km^{2} (5.16 sq mi) (2025).

814 ftDiviacka Nová Ves Climate Humid continental climate (Köppen climate classification: Dfb)

== Population ==
Population statistic (10 years)
Year	1995	2005	2015	2025
Count	1732	1769	1764	1752
Difference		+2.13%	−0.28%	−0.68%

Population statistic
Year	2024	2025
Count	1760	1752
Difference		−0.45%

It has a population of 1752 people (31 December 2025).

=== Ethnicity ===
Census 2021 (1+ %)
Ethnicity	Number	Fraction
Slovak	1767	98.71%
Not found out	22	1.22%
Total	1790	

In year 2021 was 1790 people by ethnicity 1767 as Slovak, 22 as Not found out, 6 as Czech, 4 as Other, 3 as Vietnamese, 3 as Hungarian, 2 as German, 1 as Ukrainian, 1 as Rusyn and 1 as Russian.

Note on population: The difference values of population numbers in the table "Population statistic" and in the sections "Ethnicity" & "Religion" is caused by the use of various statistical methods.

=== Religion ===
Census 2021 (1+ %)
Religion	Number	Fraction
Roman Catholic Church	1327	74.13%
None	389	21.73%
Not found out	36	2.01%
Evangelical Church	18	1.01%
Total	1790	

In year 2021 was 1790 people by religion 1327 from Roman Catholic Church, 389 from None, 36 from Not found out, 18 from Evangelical Church, 5 from Greek Catholic Church, 5 from Ad hoc movements, 3 from Christian Congregations in Slovakia, 3 from Other, 2 from Calvinist Church, 1 from Eastern Orthodox Church and 1 from Buddhism.

== Genealogical resources ==
The records for genealogical research are available at the state archive "Statny Archiv in Nitra, Slovakia"

- Roman Catholic church records (births/marriages/deaths): 1696-1784 (parish B)
- Lutheran church records (births/marriages/deaths): 1735-1950 (parish B)

== See also ==
- List of municipalities and towns in Slovakia
