= Master of the stewards =

The master of the stewards or master of the table (German: Königliche Obertruchsess, Hungarian: étekfogómester, and Latin: dapiferorum regalium magistri or magister dapiferorum) was one of the high officials of the royal household in the Kingdom of Hungary. Masters of the steward were included among the "true barons" of the realm from around 1220.

== Sources ==
- Engel, Pál (2001). The Realm of St Stephen: A History of Medieval Hungary, 895–1526. I.B. Tauris Publishers. ISBN 1-86064-061-3.
- Fallenbüchl, Zoltán (1988). Magyarország főméltóságai ("High Dignitaries in Hungary") (in Hungarian). Maecenas Könyvkiadó. ISBN 963-02-5536-7.
- Stephen Werbőczy: The Customary Law of the Renowned Kingdom of Hungary in Three Parts (1517) (Edited and translated by János M. Bak, Péter Banyó and Martyn Rady with an introductory study by László Péter) (2005). Charles Schlacks, Jr. Publishers. ISBN 1-884445-40-3.
