= Master of the treasury =

The Master of the Treasury or treasurer (German: Königlicher Ober-Schatzmeister or Tarnackmeister, Hungarian: tárnokmester, Latin: magister tavarnicorum, magister tavernocorum regalium or summus camerarius, Slovak: taverník Croatian: tavernik) was a royal official in the Kingdom of Hungary from the 12th century. Although treasurers were initially responsible for collecting and administering royal revenues, they adopted more and more judiciary functions and turned into the highest judges of the realm. From the 14th century, treasurers presided over the court of appeals for a group of the free royal cities, including Buda, Bártfa, Eperjes, Kassa, Nagyszombat and Pressburg (Pozsony) (today Bardejov, Prešov, Košice, Trnava and Bratislava in Slovakia). By the end of the Middle Ages, it gradually evolved into a judicial position, and by the 20th century it had become a title without function.

The name is derived from the Slavic word tovor ("casket", "strong-box").

== Middle Ages ==
Initially, the treasurer (taverník) was the administrator of the royal treasury (i.e. the financial manager of the royal Court (curia regis)) in the early Hungarian state. In the 12th and 13th century, besides the curia regis, he became also responsible for the remaining properties of the king. When the royal properties were considerably reduced under King Andrew II of Hungary (1205-1235; see Comitatus (Kingdom of Hungary) for details), the treasurer also became responsible for all royal income from royal régales (coinage, exchange of coins, precious metals management, mining monopoly, salt monopoly, customs duty), from the taxes of royal towns etc.

Under King Charles Robert (1308–1342) he became a kind of combined finance minister and minister of economy. In 1385, the actual treasurer function, i.e. administrator of the royal treasury, became the responsibility of a separate person, who was the treasurer (magister tavernicorum)'s deputy first, and later a separate royal officer.

The observance of rights and duties of royal towns was also the responsibility of the treasurer. Since the importance of these towns increased in the 14th and 15th century, the treasurer's importance increased as well. He became also the judge charged with appeals from major free royal towns (tavernical courts). Around 1400, the list of these towns was not stabilized yet, but from the first half of the 15th century, these towns stabilised (Buda, Kassa (Košice), Pressburg (Pozsony, Bratislava), Nagyszombat (Trnava), Eperjes (Prešov), Sopron and Bártfa (Bardejov)) and were called "tavernical towns". In the course of the 15th century, these tavernical courts became the only courts of the tavernical towns. By the late 15th century, the associate judges of these courts were representatives of the tavernical towns only (and no additional nobles as was the case earlier). The law applied in these courts was a special "tavernical law" (ius tavernicale), the first collection of which arose in 1412-18 (Vetusta iura civitatum sive iura civilia). It was used as special law system until the 18th century.

The treasurer was also a member of the Royal Chamber and later also of the Vice-regency council (see palatine).

== Modern times ==
After the Battle of Mohács on 29 August 1526, the Kingdom of Hungary was divided into two parts, while the central authority collapsed. John Zápolya and Ferdinand of Habsburg were both elected Kings of Hungary, on 10 November and 17 December, respectively. Ferdinand I reorganized the state administrative structure by the introduction of the Austrian practice; he established the Hungarian Chamber in 1528, a board functioning on a permanent basis. After its creation, the supreme financial and economic authority of the Kingdom of Hungary between 1528 and 1848, which was directly subordinated to the Court Chamber in Vienna, the influence of the Master of the treasury further decreased, because this authority took over many of his tasks.

From the beginning of the 16th century, the Master of the Treasury was the fourth highest rank of secular positions. In the event of the impediment of the Palatine or the County Judge, he presided over the meetings of the Upper Council, and later also of the seven-person Council.

The function (including the tavernical courts) was abolished de facto in 1848; the treasurer's function, however, continued to exist formally from 1867 till 1918 as the fourth highest royal dignitary, who was member of the Upper Chamber of the parliament of the Kingdom of Hungary and played a certain role in the coronation of the king.

== List of Masters of the Treasury ==
Image	Name	Term Start	Term End	Ruler	Notes
	Elek Thurzó	1523	1527	Louis II	
	András Báthori	10 November 1527	1534	Ferdinand I	
	Ferenc II Drugeth	1527	1533	John I	
	Tamás Nádasdy	1536	1543	Ferdinand I	
	Ferenc Kendi	1539		John I	
	András Báthori	1 January 1544	1 June 1554	Ferdinand I	
	Gábor Perényi	5 November 1554	1557	Ferdinand I	
	Miklós Zrínyi	23 November 1557	7 September 1566	Ferdinand I, Maximilian II	
	György Zrínyi	1567	1603	Maximilian II, Rudolf II	
	Tamás Erdődy	19 August 1603	1608	Rudolf II, Matthias	
	Zsigmond Forgách	1 December 1608	1610	Matthias	
	János Draskovich	25 January 1610	11 May 1613	Matthias	
	Vacant	1613	1615	Matthias	
	Tamás Erdődy	27 April 1615	16 January 1624	Matthias, Ferdinand II	
	Vacant	January 1624	October 1625	Ferdinand II	
	Kristóf Bánffy	8 October 1625	1643	Ferdinand II, Ferdinand III	
	István Csáky	15 March 1644	5 November 1662	Ferdinand III, Leopold I	
	György Erdődy	22 November 1662	1663	Leopold I	
	Ádám Forgách	8 June 1663	1679	Leopold I	
	Imre Erdődy	21 August 1679	1690	Leopold I	
	István Zichy	12 June 1690	1693	Leopold I	
	György Erdődy	7 April 1693	15 January 1704	Leopold I	
	Vacant	1704	1705	Leopold I	
	Zsigmond Csáky	17 November 1706	1739	Joseph I, Charles VI	
	Lipót Flórián Nádasdy	9 May 1739	2 August 1746	Charles VI, Maria Theresa	
	Ferenc Esterházy	3 August 1746	August 1754	Maria Theresa	
	József Illésházy	24 November 1755	21 August 1759	Maria Theresa	
	Ádám Batthyány	21 August 1759	1782	Maria Theresa, Joseph II	
	János Csáky	18 October 1782	14 August 1783	Joseph II	
	Kristóf Niczky	14 August 1783	21 December 1786	Joseph II	
	Antal Jankovich	21 December 1786	1789	Joseph II	
	Péter Végh	27 April 1789	21 July 1795	Joseph II, Leopold II, Francis II	
	József Majláth	23 July 1795	1797	Francis II	
	Ferenc Szentiványi	21 October 1797	16 April 1802	Francis II	
	József Brunswick	16 April 1802	18 March 1825	Francis II	
	Antal Mózes Cziráky	3 April 1825	1827	Francis II	
	Fidél Pálffy	18 March 1828	1836	Francis II, Ferdinand V	
	Ignác Eötvös	9 August 1836	1841	Ferdinand V	
	Gábor Keglevich	12 January 1842	1848	Ferdinand V	

== See also ==
- Palatine (Kingdom of Hungary)
- Judge royal
