= Pozsony County =

County of the Kingdom of Hungary

Pozsony County Comitatus Posoniensis (Latin) Pozsony vármegye (Hungarian) Komitat Pressburg (German) Prešporská župa (Slovak)
- County of the Kingdom of Hungary (c. 1000 – 1923)
- Coat of arms

- Capital: Pozsony
- Area
  - Coordinates: 48°9′N 17°7′E
  - 1910: 4,370 km^{2} (1,690 sq mi)
- Population
  - 1910: 389,750
- History
  - Established: c. 1000
  - Treaty of Trianon: 4 June 1920
  - Merged into Győr-Moson-Pozsony County: 1923
- Today part of: Slovakia (4,323 km^{2}); Hungary (47 km^{2})
- Bratislava is the current name of the capital.

Pozsony county was an administrative county (comitatus) of the Kingdom of Hungary. Its territory is now mostly part of Slovakia, while a small area belongs to Hungary. In 1969, the three villages that remained in Hungary were combined to form Dunasziget.

Its name changed along with that of the city of Pressburg (Hungarian: Pozsony, today's Bratislava). Its names around 1900 were Pozsony vármegye in Hungarian, Prešpurská župa in Slovak and Preßburger Gespanschaft in German.

== Geography ==
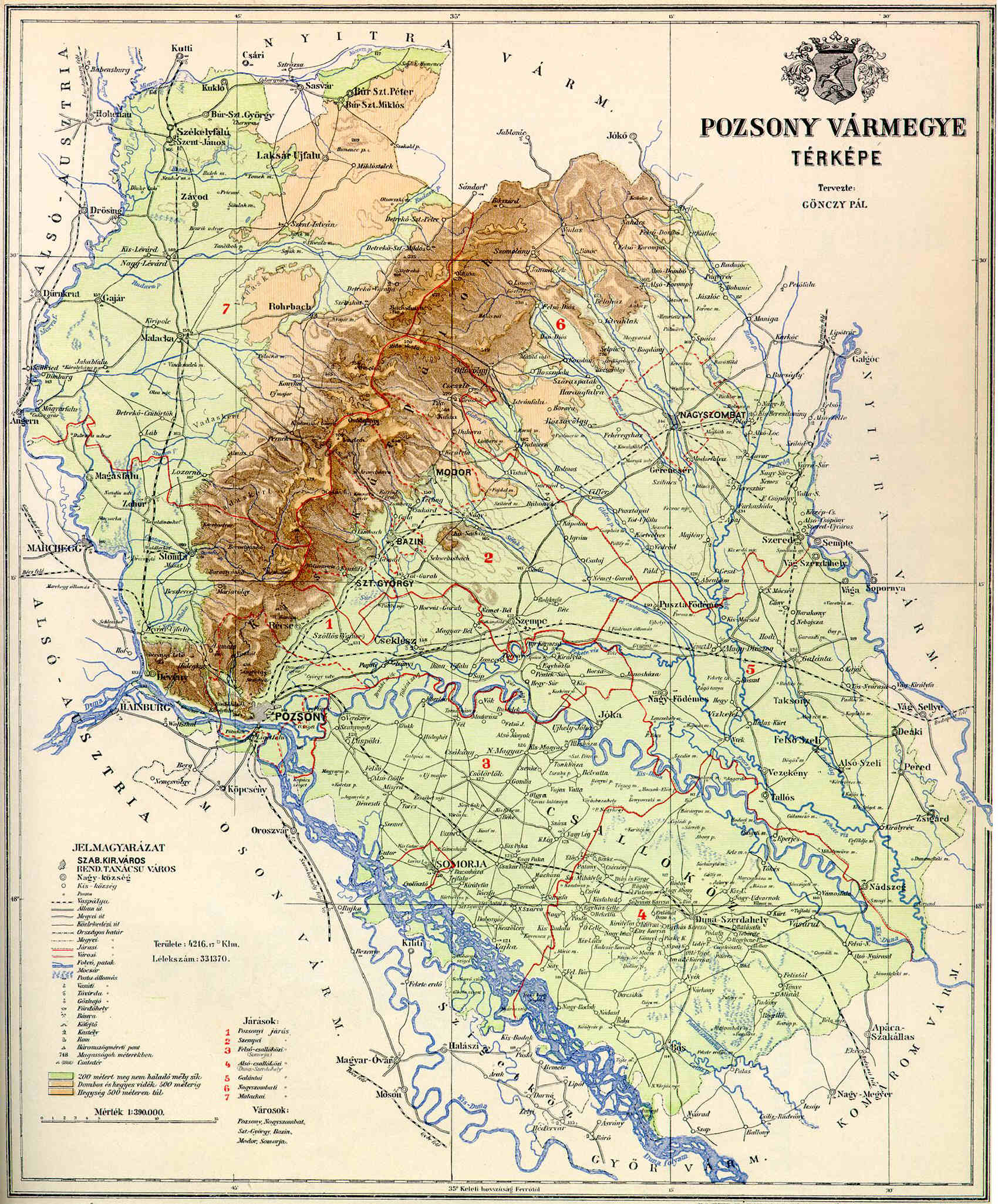
Map of Pozsony, 1891

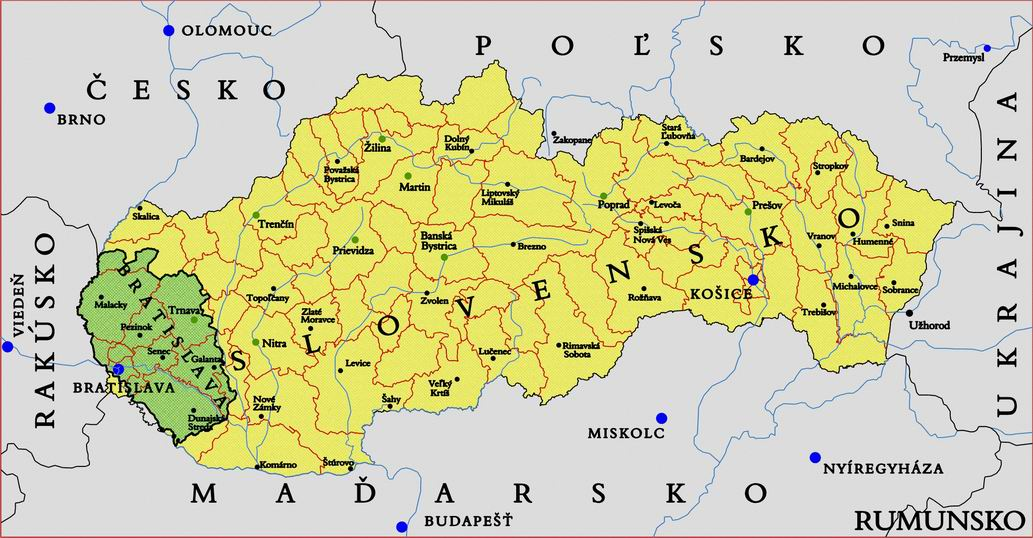
Former county of Pozsony superimposed on map of contemporary Slovakia

The county shared borders with the Austrian land of Lower Austria and the Hungarian counties Nyitra, Komárom, Győr and Moson. It was situated between the river Morava in the west, the river Danube in the south, and the river Váh (Hungarian: Vág) in the east. The southern part of the Little Carpathians divided the county into two. It also covered most of the island known today as Žitný ostrov (Hungarian: Csallóköz) between the Danube and the Little Danube. Its area was 4,370 km^{2} around 1910.

== Seats ==
The seats of Pozsony county were the Pozsony Castle (present-day Bratislava Castle) and Somorja (present-day Šamorín), and from the 18th century onwards the town of Pressburg.

== History ==
A sort of predecessor to Pozsony county may be existed as early as the 9th century during the time of Great Moravia. After Pozsony county's territory had become part of the Kingdom of Hungary, the Hungarian comitatus was created around 1000 or even earlier. It was one of the first counties created in the Kingdom of Hungary. Its territory comprised roughly what is today Bratislava Region and Trnava Region. Throughout its history it was among the most prosperous territories of Hungary, and until the late 18th century it was particularly advanced and prosperous. In the 18th and 19th century, the population consisted of Germans (mainly in Pressburg and larger towns), Hungarians (mainly in the south, some suburbs of Pressburg, (Note: In 1900: particularly present-day Podunajské Biskupice and Vrakuňa (cca 90%)) Slovaks (mainly in the north and in the suburbs of Pressburg (Note: In 1900: present-day Lamač, Dúbravka, Záhorská Bystrica – more than 93% of the population, present-day Vajnory (93%) and Rača (75%).) and Croats (mainly in the suburbs of Pressburg).

In the aftermath of World War I, most of Pozsony county became part of newly formed Czechoslovakia, as recognized by the concerned states in 1920 by the Treaty of Trianon. As Bratislava county, it continued to exist until 1927 in Czechoslovakia, but it had completely different powers and somewhat modified borders. A small part south of the river Danube remained part of Hungary and joined Győr-Moson-Pozsony county.

Following the provisions of the First Vienna Award, the southeastern part of the area (Žitný ostrov, Senec, Galanta) became part of Hungary again in November 1938. The approximate Trianon borders were restored after World War II.

== Demographics ==
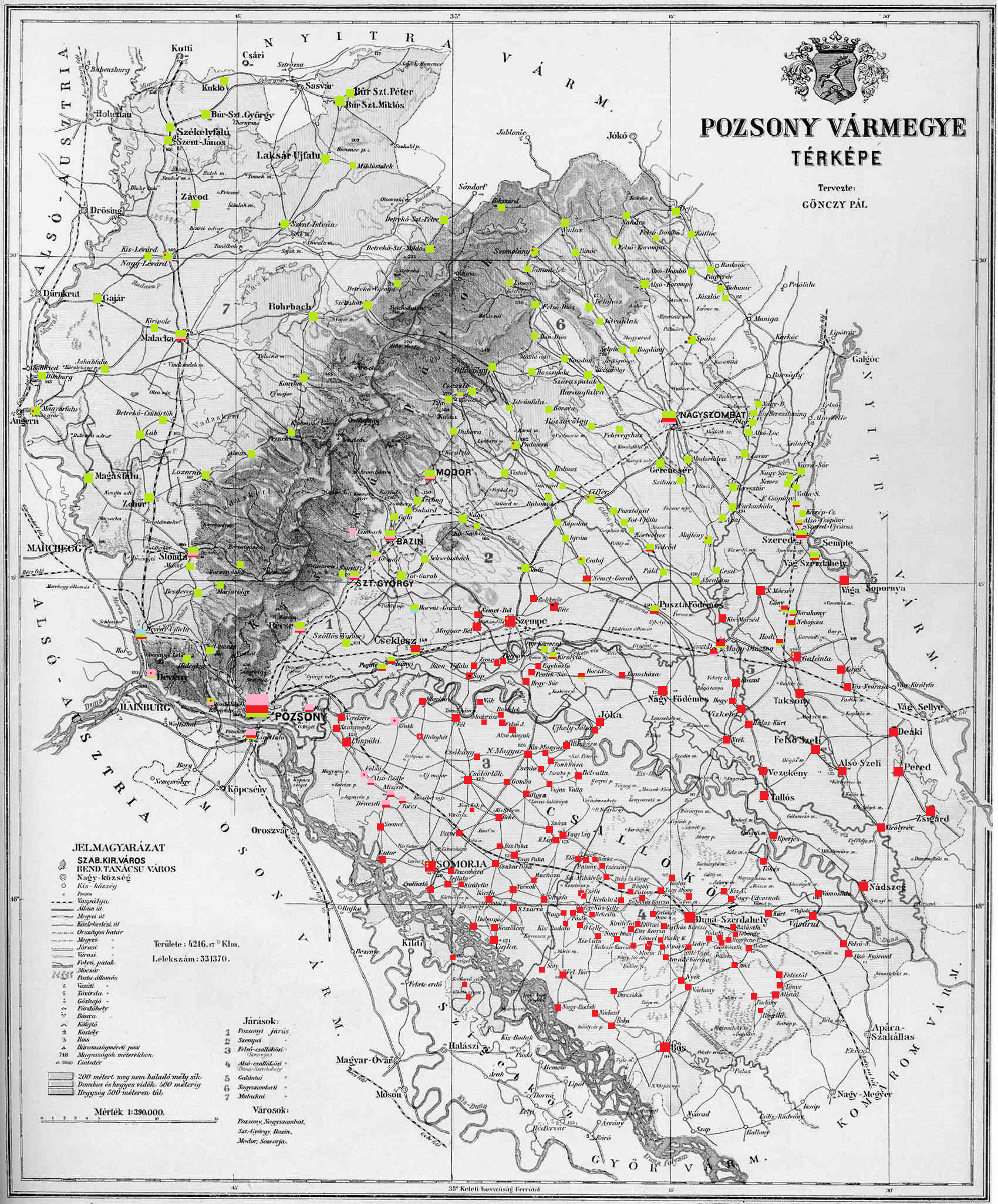
Ethnic map of the county with data of the 1910 census (see the key in the description)

Population by mother tongue (Note: Only linguistic communities > 1% are displayed.)
Census	Total	Slovak	Hungarian	German	Other or unknown
1880	314,173	133,580 (44.24%)	108,918 (36.07%)	54,370 (18.01%)	5,098 (1.69%)
1890	331,370	149,741 (45.19%)	119,899 (36.18%)	55,903 (16.87%)	5,827 (1.76%)
1900	367,502	164,585 (44.78%)	139,835 (38.05%)	56,358 (15.34%)	6,724 (1.83%)
1910	389,750	166,017 (42.60%)	163,367 (41.92%)	53,822 (13.81%)	6,544 (1.68%)

Population by religion (Note: Only religious communities > 1% are displayed.)
Census	Total	Roman Catholic	Lutheran	Jewish	Calvinist	Other or unknown
1880	314,173	262,050 (83.41%)	23,476 (7.47%)	20,671 (6.58%)	7,634 (2.43%)	342 (0.11%)
1890	331,370	277,921 (83.87%)	24,360 (7.35%)	21,304 (6.43%)	7,619 (2.30%)	166 (0.05%)
1900	367,502	309,861 (84.32%)	26,112 (7.11%)	22,246 (6.05%)	8,854 (2.41%)	429 (0.12%)
1910	389,750	331,265 (84.99%)	26,456 (6.79%)	22,588 (5.80%)	8,924 (2.29%)	517 (0.13%)

== Subdivisions ==
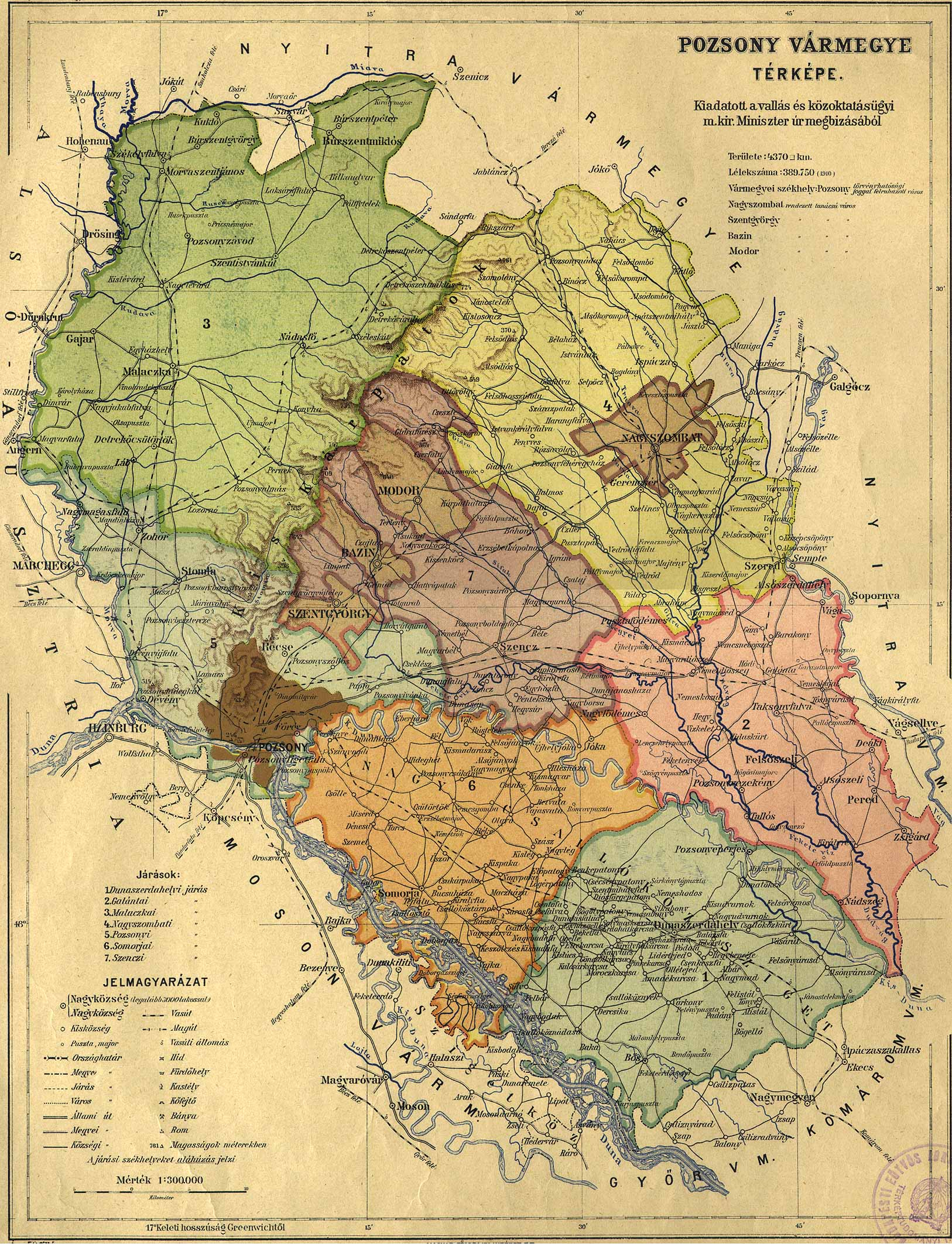

In the early 20th century, the subdivisions of Pozsony county were:

Districts (járás)
District	Capital
Dunaszerdahely	Dunaszerdahely (now Dunajská Streda)
Galánta	Galánta (now Galanta)
Malacka	Malacka (now Malacky)
Nagyszombat	Nagyszombat (now Trnava)
Pozsony	Pozsony (now Bratislava)
Somorja	Somorja (now Šamorín)
Szenc	Szenc (now Senec)
Urban counties (törvényhatósági jogú város)
Pozsony (now Bratislava)
Urban districts (rendezett tanácsú város)
Bazin (now Pezinok)
Modor (now Modra)
Nagyszombat (now Trnava)
Szentgyörgy (now Svätý Jur)
