= List of Hungarian cardinals =

This is an incomplete list of Hungarian cardinals of the Catholic Church. The dates in parentheses are the dates of elevation and death. Living cardinals are bolded. Every Archbishop of Esztergom (and the successor office of Esztergom-Budapest) since 1828 has been created cardinal.

== 13th century ==
- Stephen Báncsa, the first Hungarian cardinal (1251–1270)

== 14th century ==
- Demetrius (1378–1387)
- Bálint Alsáni (1384–1408)

== 15th century ==
- Dénes Szécsi (1439–1465)
- Stephen Várdai (1467–1471)
- John Vitéz (1471–1472)
- John of Aragon (1477–1485)
- Gabriele Rangone (1477–1486)
- Ippolito d'Este (1493–1520)

== 16th century ==
- Tamás Bakócz (1500–1521)
- George Martinuzzi (1551)
- Antun Vrančić (1573)
- Andrew Báthory (1584–1599)
- Juraj Drašković (1585–1587)

== 17th century ==
- Ferenc Forgách (1607–1615)
- Péter Pázmány (1629–1637)
- Leopold Karl von Kollonitsch (1686–1707)

== 18th century ==
- Christian August of Saxe-Zeitz (1706–1725)
- Imre Csáky (1717–1732)
- József Batthyány (1778–1799)

== 19th century ==
- Sándor Rudnay (1828–1831)
- János Scitovszky (1853–1866)
- János Simor (1873–1891)
- Josip Mihalović (1877–1891)
- Lajos Haynald (1879–1891)
- Kolos Ferenc Vaszary (1893–1915)

== 20th century ==
- Károly Hornig (1912–1917)
- János Csernoch (1914–1927)
- Jusztinián György Serédi (1927–1945)
- József Mindszenty (1946–1975)
- László Lékai (1976–1986)
- László Paskai (1988–2015)

== 21st century ==
- **Péter Erdő** (2003–present)
- **László Nemet** (2024–present), Serbian Hungarian
