= Vaszary =

Vaszary is a surname. Notable people with the surname include:

- Gábor Vaszary (1897–1985), Hungarian novelist
- János Vaszary (1867–1939), Hungarian painter
- Kolos Ferenc Vaszary (1832–1915), Hungarian cardinal
- Piri Vaszary (1901–1965), Hungarian film actress
