= H. (noble) =

Master of the horse
- Reign: 1279
- Predecessor: Peter Aba
- Successor: Apor Péc
- Born: Unknown
- Died: after 1279

H. (died after 1279) was an unidentified nobleman in the Kingdom of Hungary, who served as master of the horse (Hungarian: lovászmester) in 1279. Besides that he was also ispán (comes) of Moson County.

A royal charter from August 1279 only preserved the first letter of his name. He might have been the same person as Herbord from the gens Osl, who held, among others, the office of master of the horse formerly in 1277.

== Sources ==
- (in Hungarian) Zsoldos, Attila (2011). Magyarország világi archontológiája, 1000–1301 ("Secular Archontology of Hungary, 1000–1301"). História, MTA Történettudományi Intézete. Budapest. ISBN 978-963-9627-38-3

Political offices
Preceded by Peter Aba	Master of the horse 1279	Succeeded by Apor Péc
Preceded by Stephen Gutkeled	Ispán of Moson; 1279	Succeeded by Peter Csák
