= János Scheffler =

Hungarian bishop (1887–1952)

Blessed Bishop János Scheffler
- Bishop of Oradea Mare
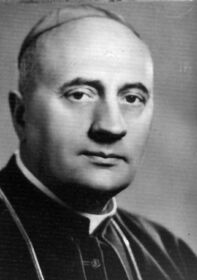
- Photograph.
- Church: Roman Catholic Church
- Diocese: Oradea Mare
- See: Oradea Mare
- Appointed: 9 April 1948
- Term ended: 6 December 1952
- Predecessor: Pál Napholcz
- Successor: József Tempfli
- Previous posts: Bishop of Satu Mare (1942-1948); Bishop of Győr (1941-1945)

Orders
- Ordination: 6 July 1910
- Consecration: 17 May 1942 by Jusztinián György Serédi
- Rank: Bishop

Personal details
- Born: János Scheffler; 29 October 1887 Kálmánd, Szatmár County, Austria-Hungary
- Died: 6 December 1952 (aged 65) Jilava Prison, Ilfov County, Romania

Sainthood
- Feast day: 6 December
- Venerated in: Roman Catholic Church
- Beatified: 3 July 2011; Satu Mare Cathedral, Romania by Cardinal Angelo Amato
- Attributes: Episcopal attire; Palm
- Patronage: Immigrants; Persecuted Christians; Diocese of Satu Mare; Diocese of Oradea Mare
- Shrines: Satu Mare Cathedral

János Scheffler (German: Johann Scheffler; 29 October 1887 – 6 December 1952) was a Hungarian-born Roman Catholic prelate who served as the bishop of two dioceses before acting as the Bishop of Oradea Mare. He was imprisoned due to opposing the Communist government policies and was killed while imprisoned. He had been noted during his episcopate for his attentiveness to vocations and for the defense of the faith from those forces that sought to disrupt it such as communism.

His beatification took place in 2011.

== Life ==
János Scheffler was born on 29 October 1887 in Kálmánd, Austria-Hungary (now Cămin, Romania) as the second of ten children. He became a Romanian citizen after the Treaty of Trianon granted the region to the Kingdom of Romania in 1920. His brother was Franz Scheffler (3 October 1894 - 29 October 1956).

In 1897 he began to feel called to become a priest though did not begin an active pursuit of this dream until 1906 since he began his high school studies in 1898 with the Jesuits. In 1906 he began his theological studies at the college in Budapest where he achieved excellent grades. Scheffler was later ordained to the priesthood in 1910. He was first assigned to Ciumești while that October saw him sent to Rome to the Pontifical Gregorian University to learn canon law where he soon became a doctor of law on 19 June 1912 upon his graduation. When he studied in Rome he lived in the priest college Santa Maria dell' Anima. In July 1914 - as World War I was beginning - he became a professor of theological studies and the dean of students at Szatmárnémeti (today Satu Mare, Romania). In November 1915 he received his scientific degree. In 1922 with the Satu Mare and Oradea Mare dioceses being merged he set up a single college becoming its first dean as well as professor of canon law and historical studies. In 1923 he became a parish priest at Moftinu Mare. In 1925 he started teaching seminarians for the priesthood and attended the Eucharistic Congress in Chicago from 20–24 June 1926. In 1939 he became a spiritual director.

In 1942, Scheffler was elected to be the Bishop of Szatmárnémeti, while in November 1945 he was transferred as the Bishop of Győr though he was not installed, because he preferred to remain in his previous diocese. He was transferred for the last time in 1948 to another diocese. Vocations became his principal concern and so he founded the "Opus Vocationum Ecclesiasticum" for the care and cultivation of vocations while also establishing several minor seminaries. After World War II he began to express opposition to government policies objecting to the deportation of Germans to the Soviet Union. He appealed for the release of Alexandru Rusu who was the Greek-Catholic Bishop of Maramureș that the new communist regime had arrested. At the time 1950 began all bishops in Romania had been arrested and Scheffler himself was among the last being placed under house arrest on 23 May 1950. He refused an offer to become a bishop in a national church subjected to the regime and so was imprisoned as a result of this on 19 March 1952.

In Jilava Prison he was tortured after having boiling water poured onto him. He died there in the morning of 6 December 1952. News of his death reached Satu Mare in 1953 and his remains were buried in the Satu Mare Cathedral in 1965; an Orthodox priest had noted the location and had the remains moved since the late bishop had been placed in an unmarked grave. His remains were exhumed on 17 June 2011 and interred in another location in the Satu Mare Cathedral.

== Beatification ==
The beatification process started on 12 December 1991 under Pope John Paul II after the Congregation for the Causes of Saints issued the official "nihil obstat" and titled Scheffler as a Servant of God. The diocesan process opened on 8 December 1994 and concluded a short time later on 5 December 1996 while the C.C.S. validated the process in Rome on 13 May 1998. The C.C.S. also received the Positio in 2002 for assessment which theologians approved on 1 July 2009 as did the C.C.S. on 20 April 2010.

On 1 July 2010, Pope Benedict XVI confirmed that Scheffler was killed "in odium fidei" (in hatred of the faith) and thus approved his beatification which Cardinal Angelo Amato celebrated for the pope on 3 July 2011 in the bishop's old diocese. He was beatified in before 8000 people. Cardinal Péter Erdő was also in attendance. Also attending were the nuncio Francisco-Javier Lozano Sebastián and the Archbishop of Bucharest Ioan Robu as well as Cardinal Lucian Mureșan and both the Eger archbishop Csaba Ternyák and the Alba Iulia archbishop György Jakubinyi.

The current postulator for this cause is the Salesian priest János Szöke.
