= Herbord Osl =

Hungarian nobleman

Herbord (I) Osl

Master of the stewards
- Reign: 1274
- Predecessor: Reynold Básztély
- Successor: Nicholas Pok
- Died: 1279 or 1280
- Noble family: gens Osl
- Issue: Herbord II; Catherine
- Father: Osl I

Herbord (I) from the kindred Osl (Hungarian: Osl nembeli (I.) Herbord; died 1279 or 1280) was a Hungarian nobleman and courtier, who served as Master of the horse from 1273 to 1274 and in 1277 (it is possible he also bore the dignity in 1279). He was also Master of the stewards for a short time in 1274. He was a confidant of the Hungarian monarchs during the internal wars.

== Ancestry and family ==
Herbord was born into the gens (clan) Osl, which originated from Sopron County. He was one of the seven sons of Osl I, the first known member of the kindred, who founded a Premonstratensian monastery in Csorna. Herbord's brothers were Beled, who was Master of the cupbearers in the court of Duke Béla and ancestor of the Vicai family, which existed until 1873; Osl II, who served as Master of the treasury and Ban of Severin, and was also ancestor of the Ostfi family; Benedict, Bishop of Várad then Győr; Nicholas, who functioned as ispán of Győr County; Thomas, who did not hold any courtly positions, was forefather of the Csornai and Kanizsai noble families; and John, whose branch died out by the early 14th century.

Herbord had two children from his unidentified wife: his son was Herbord II, also called with the surname Herbortyai, who was last mentioned by contemporary records in 1321. He had a son Stephen. Herbord's branch, which remained marginal in the nobility, became extinct between around 1453 and 1455. His only daughter was Catherine, who married John Csák ("the Greyhound") from the Kisfalud branch of the gens Csák. She was deceased person by 1258 and her marriage produced three children; through them she became matriarch of the Mihályi then Csáky de Mihály noble families.

== Military and court service ==
Herbord Osl grew up in the royal court of Andrew II together with Duke Béla, therefore possibly he was born in the early 1200s. He belonged to the group of so-called "royal youth" (Hungarian: királyi ifjak, Latin: iuvenis noster), who supported the monarchs and took a leading role in royal military campaigns. He was first chronologically mentioned by contemporary documents in 1230, when participated in the military campaign of the duke, who crossed the Carpathian Mountains and laid siege to Halych together with his Cuman allies. According to King Béla's charter from 1248, he "fought appreciatively" at the "Porta Rusica" (lit. "Russian Gate"), then participated in the skirmish along the river Dniester. It is possible that he also fought in the post-1235 wars against the Kingdom of Galicia–Volhynia, following Béla IV ascended the Hungarian throne after his father's death. During the First Mongol invasion of Hungary, when Béla escaped after the disastrous Battle of Mohi, took place on 11 April 1241, and fled to the coast of the Adriatic Sea, Herbord left behind his estates and relatives and joined to the royal companion to Croatia and Dalmatia by the end of June. The king took refugee in the well-fortified Trogir and entrusted Herbord to protect his eldest son Stephen at the fortress of Klis. Subsequently, he was one of the nobles, who protected the western boundary against the raids of Frederick the Quarrelsome. Herbord besieged and successfully recaptured the castle of Kőszeg with his own army from the Austrian and Styrian troops, according to the aforementioned royal charter of 1248. For his success and loyalty, he was granted landholdings beyond the Drava river.

According to the royal charter of 1248, he was sent to foreign courts in several occasions as an envoy and representative of the Hungarian king throughout in the 1230s. He acted in this capacity primarily on behalf of princes Coloman then Rostislav, pretender to the Principality of Halych. It is possible, that he was involved in Hungarian legations to the Polish and Bohemian realms too. He also served his monarch in Dalmatia as his loyal trustee following the Mongol invasion.

Especially since the 1250s, Herbord was commissioned to act as a pristaldus (royal commissioner or "bailiff") by Béla IV. For instance, when the monarch judged in the lawsuit between Amadeus Pok, Bishop of Győr and the burghers of Sopron over the property right of port duties in Lake Fertő (Neusiedl) in 1254, Herbord and a delegate of the Pannonhalma Abbey drafted the borders in the region. He again appeared as a pristaldus during a revisory act of the donation of Vasvár in 1256. He led an investigation in the case of lands Babót and Monoros in 1262. Alongside the abbot of the Klostermarienberg Abbey (Borsmonostor), he inaugurated the ispánate (lordship) of Locsmánd (present-day Lutzmannsburg in Austria) to the ownership of Lawrence Aba, Master of the stewards in 1263. He usually functioned as pristaldus in connection with legal affairs in Sopron County in the second half of the 1260s too. He remained loyal to Béla IV, whose relationship with his oldest son and heir, Stephen, became tense in the early 1260s, which caused a civil war lasting until 1266. He was referred to as baron (thus a holder of a royal dignity) in 1266, but the royal charter did not specify his office. It is possible that he served as Master of the horse or Master of the cupbearers sometimes in the 1260s.

Herbord was considered a loyal partisan of Béla IV. During his court service, he has successfully increased his fortune. He first appeared in contemporary documents in this context in 1238, when bought a vineyard from the nobles of Őrség for 26 marks. In the next year, he filed a lawsuit alongside his brothers against their relative Nicholas, son of Szatmár, who donated some of his landholdings in Sopron County to the Knights Templar. However their verdict was unsuccessful, as Béla IV confirmed Nicholas' last will and the donated lands remained property of the chivalric order. Herbord acquired the land of Széplak from his nephew John by pledge in 1261, in addition to some portions in Csorna. He bought Pertel (today Magyarkeresztúr) in 1269. He gained the estate Bezeg from Nicholas Ákos via a lawsuit; the land laid in the neighbor of Csáva (present-day Stoob, Austria), which then was the centre of Herbord's domains. He was granted the land Rasina in Slavonia by Béla IV in 1248; this is the only known royal donation for Herbord, who founded a nearby village, which was subsequently called Herbortya after him. Following acquiring estates in Sopron County, he moved to Széplak, where he intended to build a new residence. Despite his efforts, his aspirations to increase the number of possessions remained marginal and confined, as compared to his powerful neighbor lords, the Kőszegi family and the Csák clan. When Stephen V ascended the Hungarian throne after his father's death in 1270, the newly crowned monarch permitted Herbord to build a fortress at Lake Fertő in order to strengthen the Western border against Ottokar II of Bohemia.

== Last years as baron ==
Following the sudden death of Stephen V and the coronation of the child ruler Ladislaus IV in 1272, Herbord was made ispán of Tolna County, according to two royal charters in November. Following that, he was appointed ispán of Baranya County still in that year. He again served in this capacity from 1273 to 1275, and for a short time in 1277. While holding the latter office, he and his namesake son had various lawsuits and hostilities with local baron Conrad Győr, who owned extended lands in the county (some historians claim those documents referred to Herbord from the gens Hahót).

Herbord elevated into the position of Master of the horse in late 1273, holding the dignity until the next year, simultaneously with his position in Baranya County. During that time, the Kőszegi–Gutkeled–Geregye baronial group governed the kingdom, obtaining the majority of the dignities of the royal court, but considerably Herbord did not belong to their alliance. He lost his office at the same time, when the Kőszegis were expelled from the power after the Battle of Föveny, but Herbord was appointed Master of the stewards thereafter. Nevertheless, he bore the title only for few days in September 1274, when he was replaced by Nicholas Pok. Ladislaus IV donated Rábakecöl to Herbord in 1276; he exchanged the land for some other estates in Sopron County in the next year. He was again appointed as Master of the horse and ispán of Baranya County in the first half of 1277; the Csák baronial group obtained the majority of positions during that time. Soon, Herbord was replaced by Peter Aba still in that year, around November. He was last mentioned as ispán of Vas County by a royal charter in March 1279. It is possible that he is identical with that unidentified nobleman H., as only the first letter was preserved from his name in a charter of August 1279, who was mentioned as Master of the horse and ispán of Moson County. Herbord was referred to as a deceased person by 1280, when his son Herbord II donated some of his inherited lands to the Premonstratensian monastery of Csorna, in accordance with his father's last testament.

== Sources ==
- Farkas, Csaba (2018). ""In curia nostra educatus" Királyok udvarában: Osl nembeli Herbord pályafutása ["In nostra curia educatus". In the Kings' Court: the Career of Herbord Osl]". In Farkas, Csaba; et al. (eds.). Micae Mediaevales VII (in Hungarian). Eötvös Loránd University. pp. 31–47. ISBN 978-963-284-973-7.
- Zsoldos, Attila (2011). Magyarország világi archontológiája, 1000–1301 [Secular Archontology of Hungary, 1000–1301] (in Hungarian). História, MTA Történettudományi Intézete. ISBN 978-963-9627-38-3.
- Zsoldos, Attila (2016). "A hadszervezet átalakulása a XIII. századi Magyarországon [The Transformation of the Army Organization in the 13th-Century Hungary]". In Zsoldos, Attila (ed.). Vitézek, ispánok, oligarchák. Tanulmányok a társadalom- és a hadtörténetírás határvidékéről (in Hungarian). Ministry of Defence Military History Institute and Museum. pp. 25–36. ISBN 978-963-7097-76-8.

Herbord I Genus Osl Born: ? Died: 1279 or 1280
Political offices
Preceded by Ugrin Csák	Master of the horse 1273–1274	Succeeded by Peter Aba
Preceded by Reynold Básztély	Master of the stewards 1274	Succeeded by Nicholas Pok
Preceded by Peter Aba	Master of the horse 1277	Succeeded by Peter Aba
