= Futaki =

Futaki is a surname. Notable people with the surname include:

- Demetrius Futaki (d. 1372), Hungarian Bishop of Várad
- Hajnalka Futaki (born 1990), Hungarian handball player
- Kenzo Futaki (二木 謙三; 1873–1966), Japanese doctor
- Krisztián Futaki (born 1979), Hungarian footballer
- Kota Futaki (二木 康太; born 1995), Japanese baseball player
- Makiko Futaki (二木 真希子; 1958–2016), Japanese animator
