= The Queen of the Rosary Church, Budapest =

Church in Budapest, Hungary

The Queen of the Rosary Church (Budapest)
- Rózsafüzér Királynéja-templom
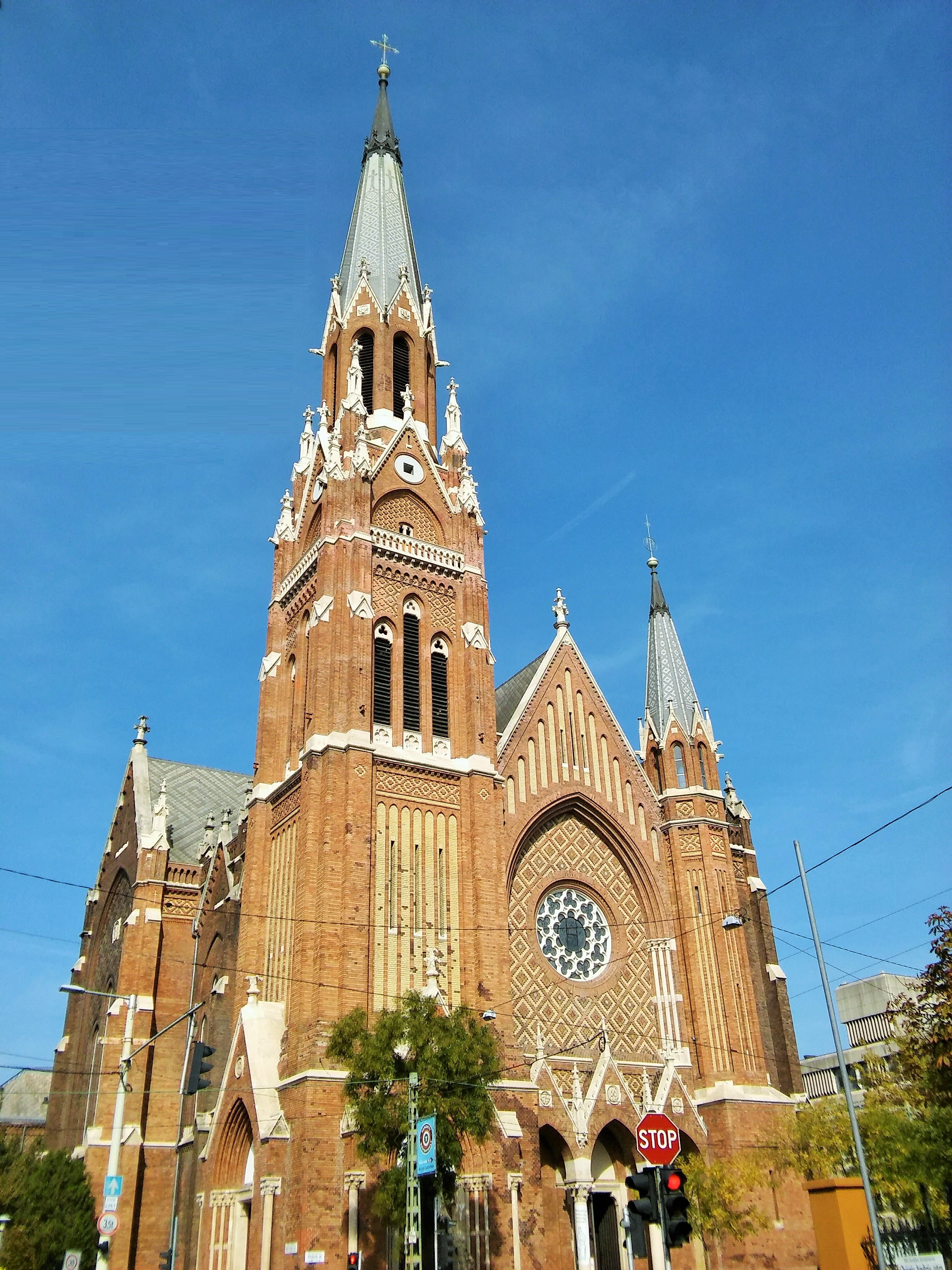
- The Queen of the Rosary Church (Budapest)
- 47.50565368004634°N 19.09067651825496°E
- Denomination: Catholic
- Religious institute: Dominican, 1915-1951 and 1989-2007

History
- Dedication: Queen of the Rosary
- Dedicated: October 3, 1915
- Events: major fire in 1997; renovation began in 2008

Architecture
- Functional status: active
- Years built: 1912-1915

Administration
- Archdiocese: Esztergom–Budapest

The Queen of the Rosary Church is an historic Roman Catholic Church in Budapest, Hungary.

== History ==
The church was designed by Ferenc Paulheim and built by Antal Hofhauser between 1912 and 1915. It was located next to the Dominican chapel, previously built in 1905, and it was dedicated on October 3, 1915 by Archbishop János Csernoch of Esztergom. Until 1951, Dominican monastic priests, and between 1951 and 1989, diocesan (non-religious) priests served in the church. Between 1989 and 2007, the church was once again served by the Dominican Order, and from 2007, for the second time, it was served by diocesan priests.

In a 1997 fire, the building and its equipment were severely damaged. The interior renovation started in 2008, and in 2012 the repair of stained glass windows began.

== Gallery ==
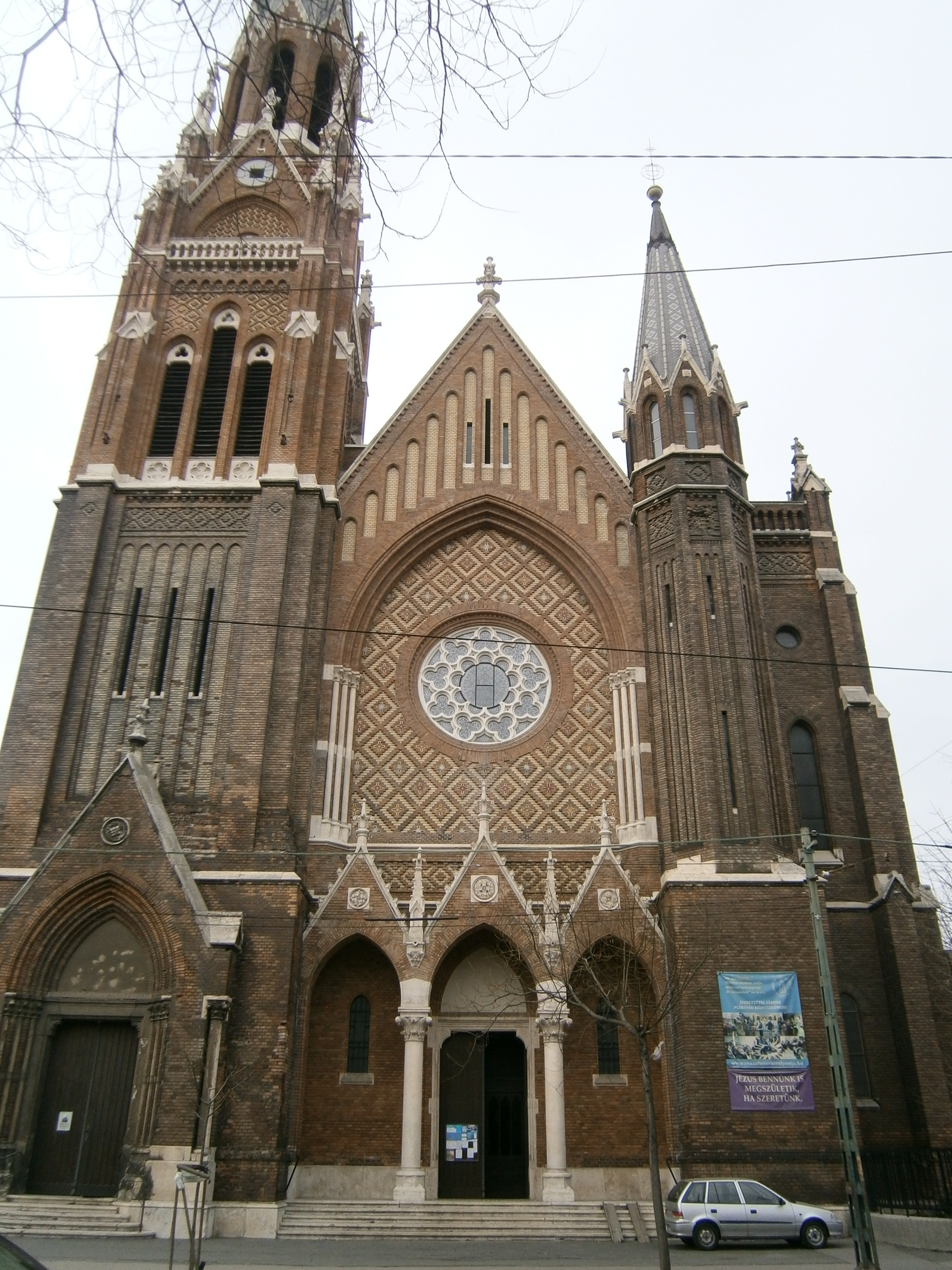

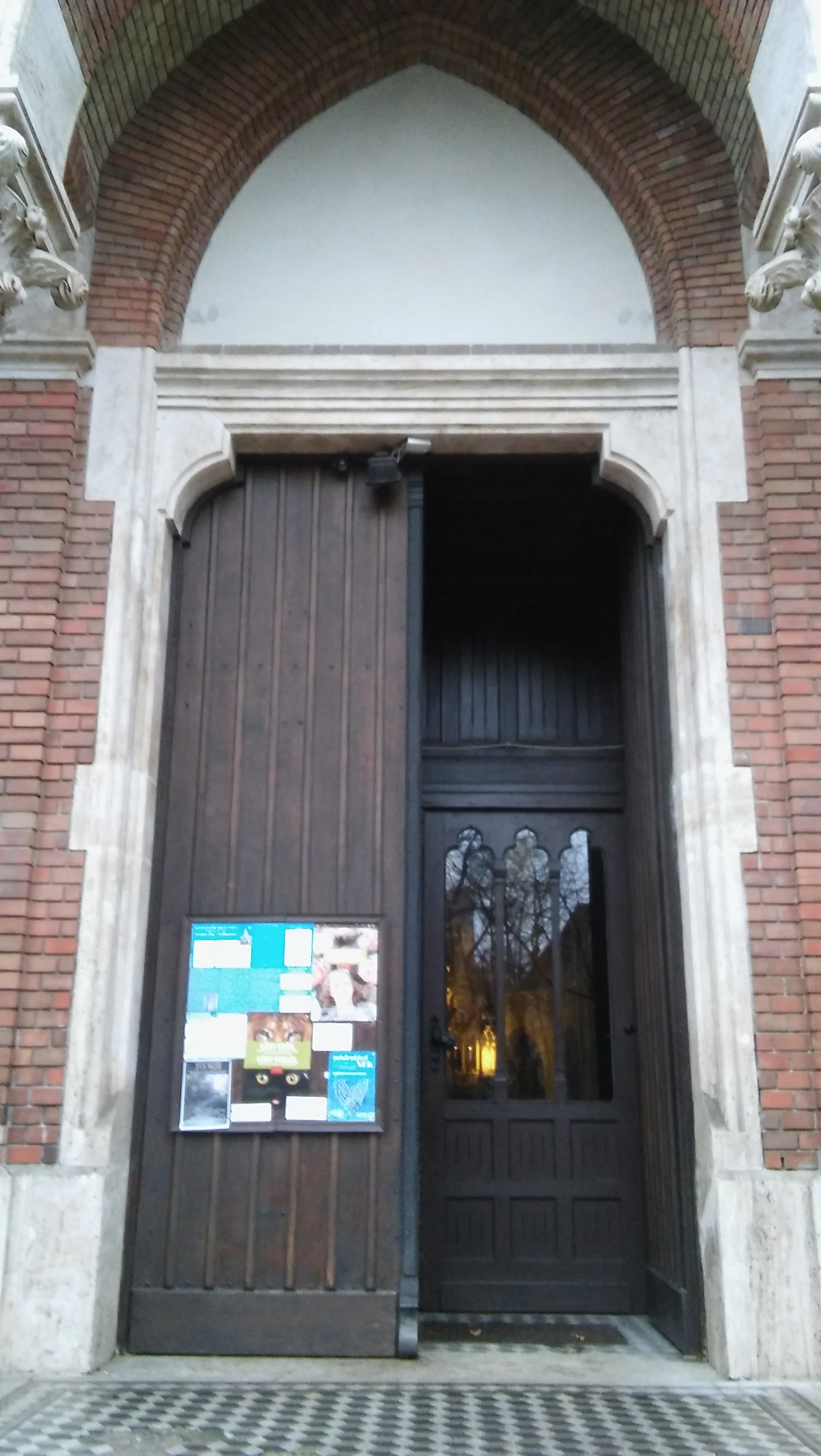

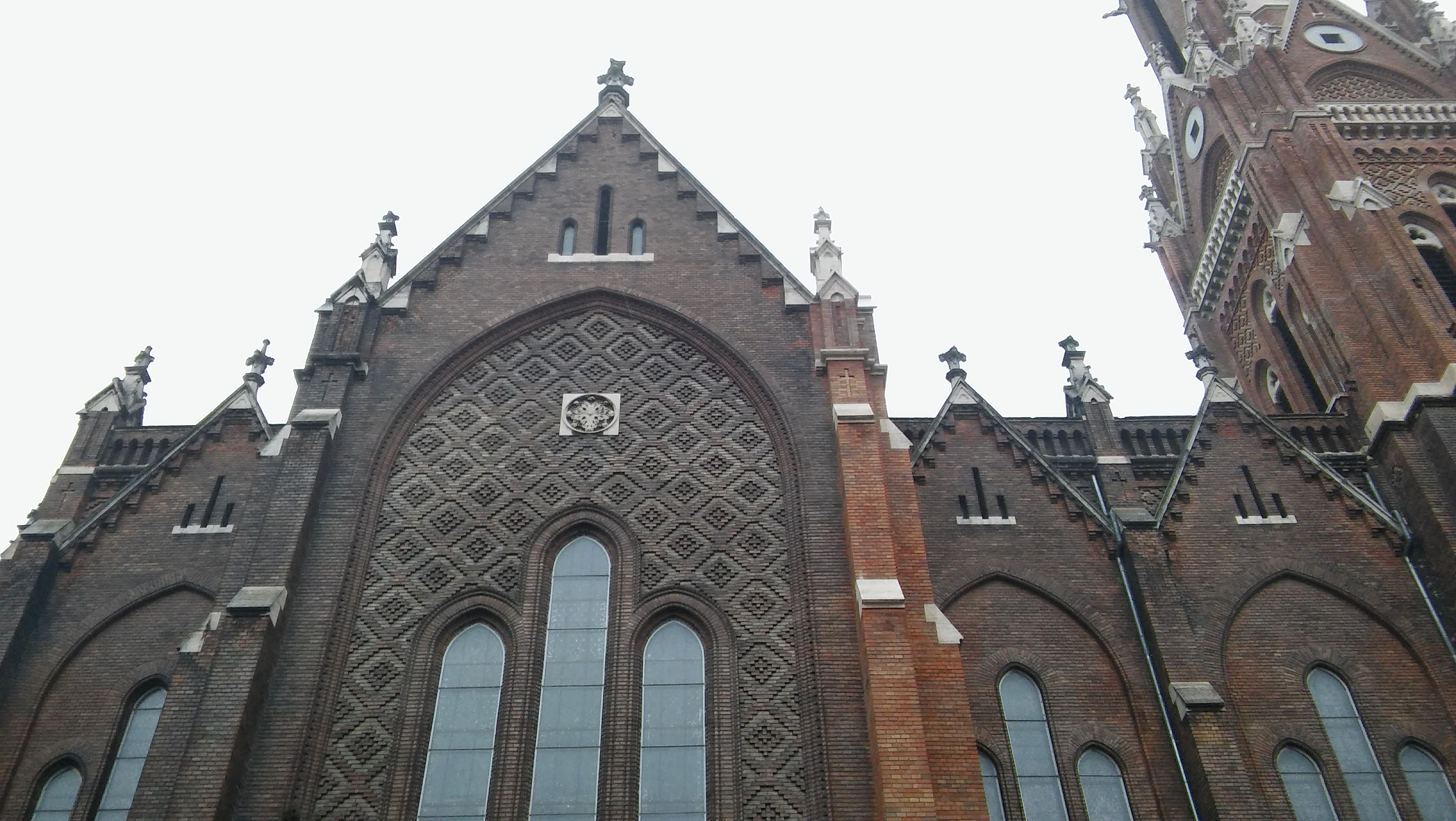

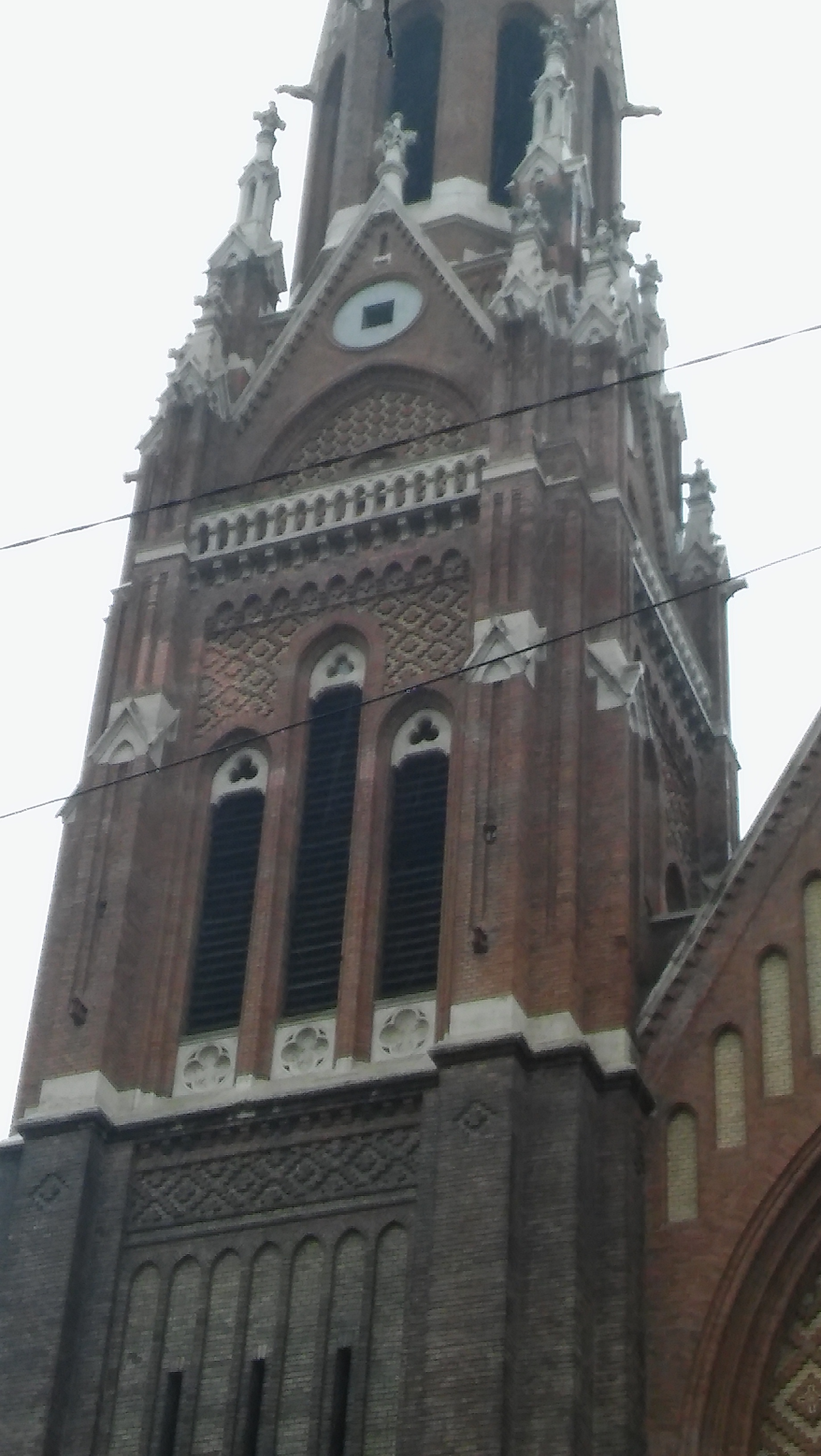

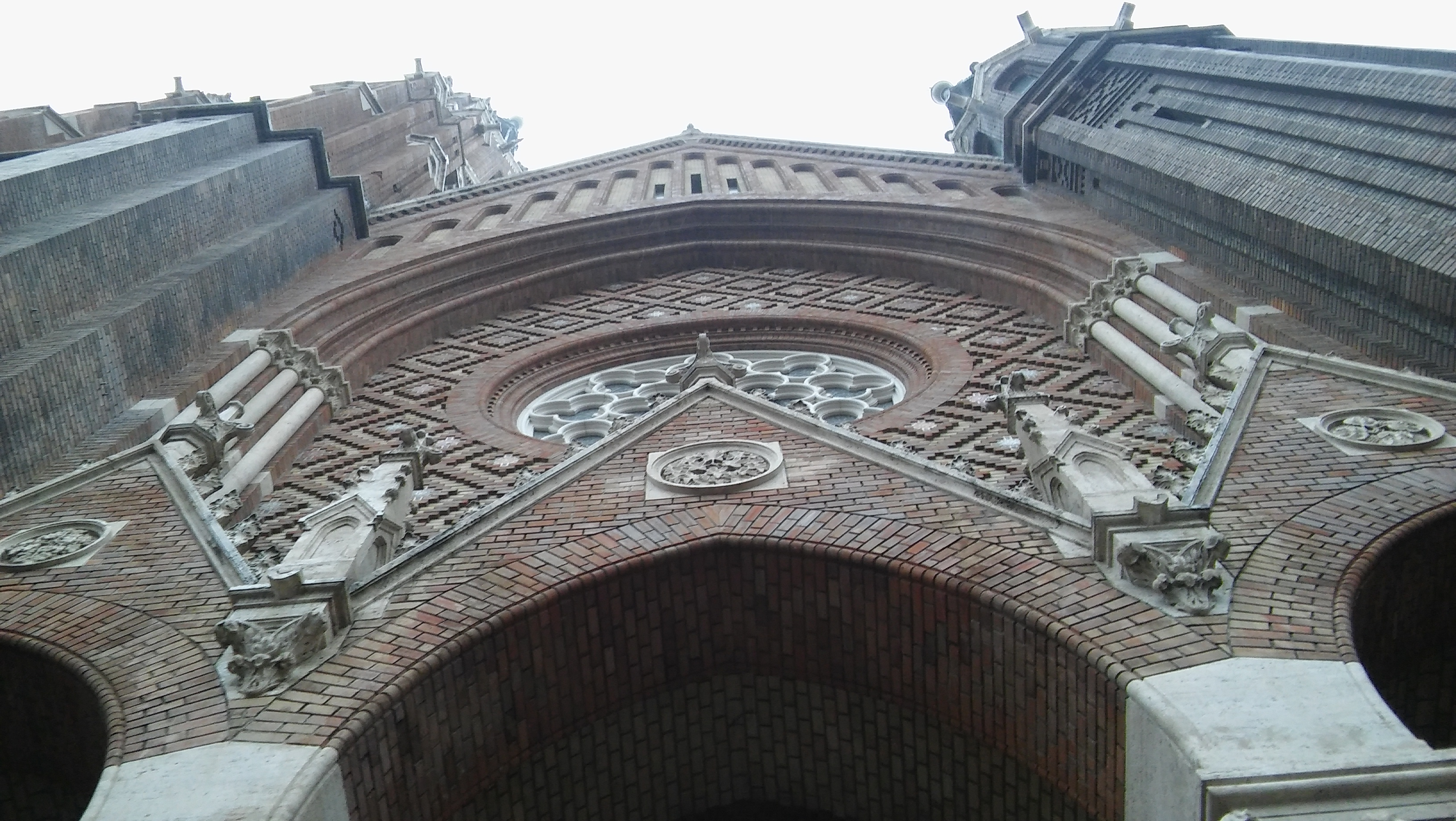

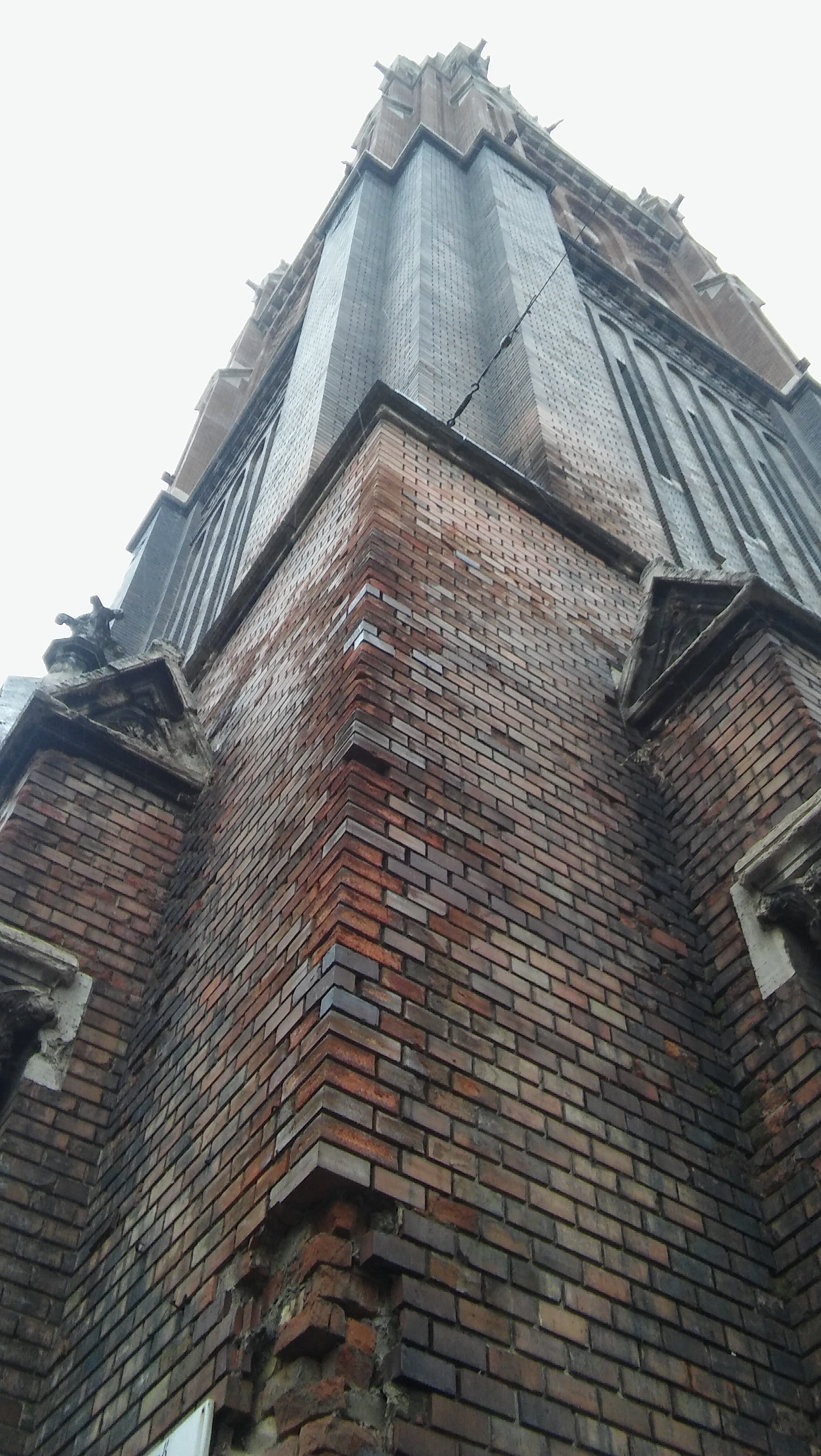

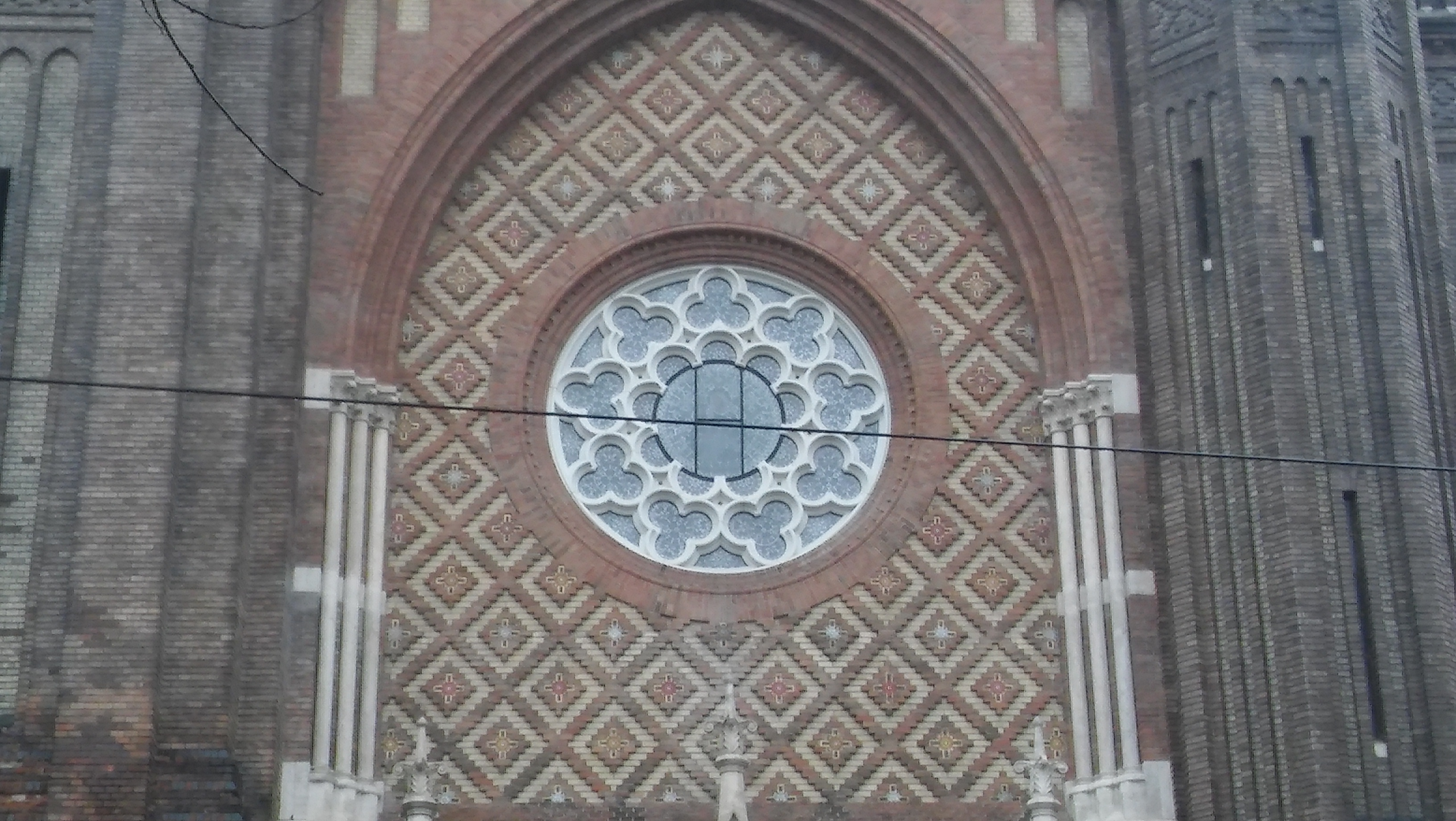

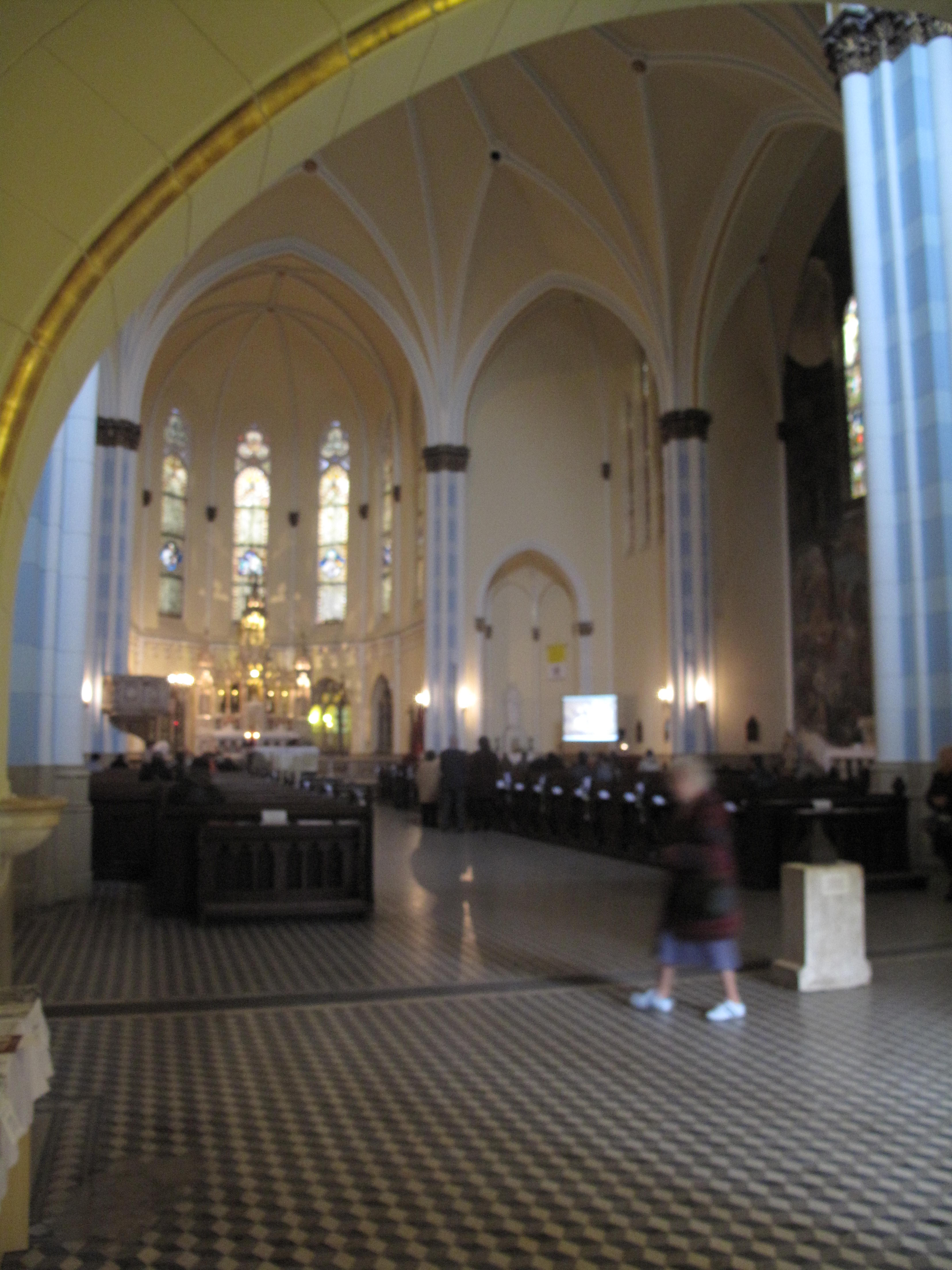

== Sources ==
- https://web.archive.org/web/20190126164356/http://www.rozsafuzerkiralyneja.hu/index.php/templomunk-toertenete
