= Ödön Vaszkó =

Hungarian painter

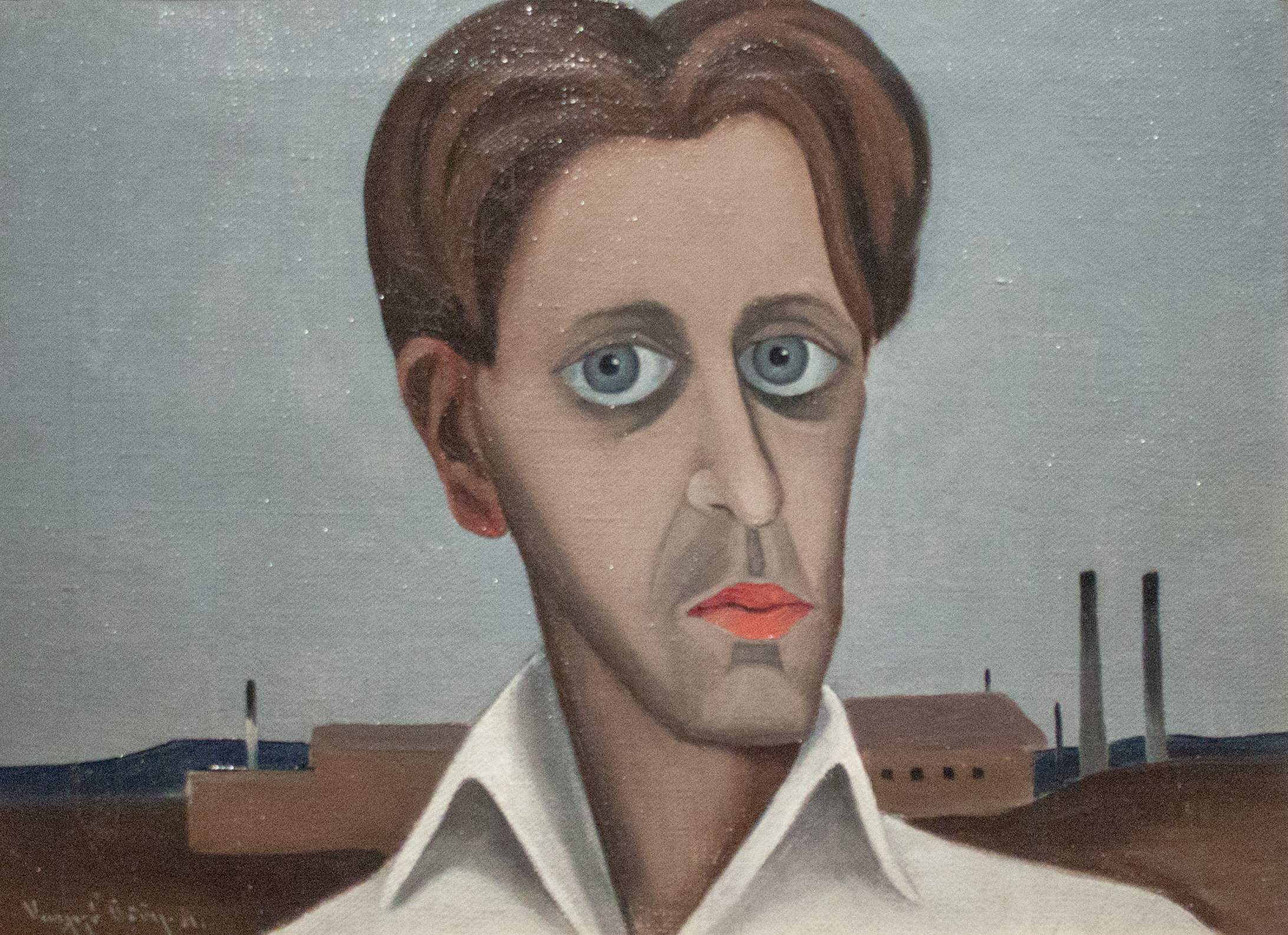
Self-portrait, 1931

Ödön Vaszkó (Pančevo, Austria-Hungary today Serbia, 4 July 1896 – Budapest, 5 January 1945) was a Hungarian painter.

== Life ==
He went to several independent art schools, and he later studied at the Hungarian University of Fine Arts.

As one of the founders of the Association of New Artists, he was very close to János Vaszary. He made his first solo exhibition in 1928 in Budapest.
