= Vincent (bishop of Várad) =

Hungarian prelate

- Bishop of Várad
- Installed: 1244
- Term ended: 1258
- Predecessor: Benedict Osl
- Successor: Zosimus
- Other post: Provost of Bács

Orders
- Consecration: 1244 or 1245

Personal details
- Died: 1258
- Denomination: Roman Catholic

Vincent (Hungarian: Vince; died 1258) was a Hungarian prelate in the mid-13th century, who served as Bishop of Várad (present-day Oradea, Romania) from 1244 until his death.

== Provost ==
Vincent was born into a kinship which possessed lands in Slavonia. He had a brother Bágyon (Bagun) and a sister, who married a certain Martin. Sometime after 1239, Vincent was elected provost of the collegiate chapter of Bács (present-day Bač, Serbia) in the Archdiocese of Kalocsa. He succeeded Stephen Báncsa in that position. Excluding a charter from 1244, he is only referred to as "provost" without adding the exact place, thus earlier historiography considered that he served in this capacity in the episcopal see Várad.

When the Mongols invaded Hungary in the spring of 1241, Vincent belonged to the accompaniment of Béla IV of Hungary, who fled to Dalmatia. According to Thomas the Archdeacon, he was present alongside numerous barons and prelates, when the king entered Split (Spalato) then Trogir (Trau) in the spring of 1242. Following the Mongols' withdrawal, Béla and his court returned to Hungary. In October 1242, Thomas, son of Lampert and – from the same kinship – his relative, provost Vincent, together with his brother Bágyon in the name of their minor nephew, complained against Béla's decision who donated the estates Mikola and Szentmárton near Svinjarevci and Vukovar to provost File Miskolc and his brothers, upon the former request of the late Coloman, Béla's brother. Both lands were properties of Ivánka, son of George, who died without descendants. Vincent and his relatives argued that those belong to them due to close kinship, but Béla IV confirmed his donation for the benefit of File and his brothers.

== Bishop ==
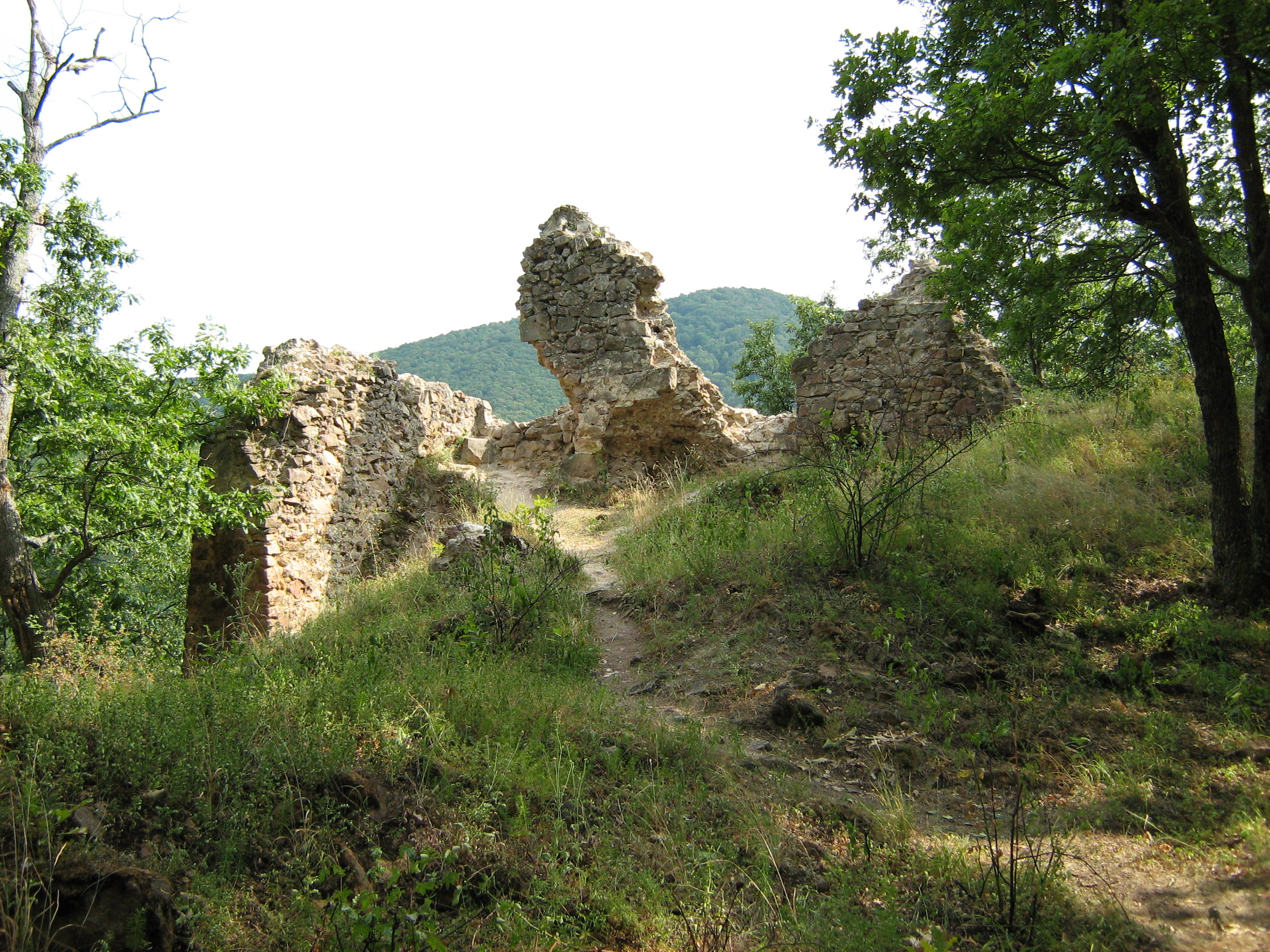
The ruins of Bélavár near Finiș, Romania, built by Vincent

Vincent was elected Bishop of Várad in the first half of 1244, succeeding Benedict Osl, who was transferred to the Diocese of Győr in the previous year. He is mentioned as bishop-elect throughout the year until October. His confirmation by Pope Innocent IV took place in either 1244 or 1245. The position of provost of Bács was declared vacant already in 1244. The next office-holder Job Záh is first mentioned in this capacity only in 1247.

The Diocese of Várad suffered heavy losses during the Mongol invasion; the episcopal see was completely ransacked and burnt together with its cathedral and treasury, while most of the clergy were killed or fled. The cathedral chapter ceased to exist. During Vincent's 14-year episcopal activity, extensive restoration work was underway, he re-established parishes and churches, and he sought to populate his diocese with subjects and churchmen. He fortified the episcopal castle of Várad and began to construct the fort of Fenes also called Bélavár (lit. "Béla's castle", ruins near present-day Finiș, Romania) to protect the route to the nearby episcopal silver mines and to take up defense against a possible later Mongol invasion. The tradition wrongly attributed the construction to Béla IV during his period as Duke of Transylvania in the 1220s.

Vincent is last mentioned by contemporary records in 1254. According to the cathedral chapter's list of suffragans, he died in 1258, still as bishop of Várad, thus he is not identical with Vincent, who served as Bishop of Nyitra (Nitra, Slovakia) from 1255 to 1279.

== Sources ==
=== Primary sources ===
- Archdeacon Thomas of Split: History of the Bishops of Salona and Split (Latin text by Olga Perić, edited, translated and annotated by Damir Karbić, Mirjana Matijević Sokol and James Ross Sweeney) (2006). CEU Press. ISBN 963-7326-59-6.

=== Secondary sources ===
- Bunyitay, Vince (1883). A váradi püspökség története alapításától a jelenkorig [A History of the Diocese of Várad from the Foundation until Present] (in Hungarian).
- C. Tóth, Norbert (2019). A kalocsa-bácsi főegyházmegye káptalanjainak középkori archontológiája [Medieval Archontology of the Chapters of the Archdiocese of Kalocsa–Bács] (in Hungarian). Kalocsai Főegyházmegyei Levéltár. ISBN 978-615-5940-01-9.
- Zsoldos, Attila (2011). Magyarország világi archontológiája, 1000–1301 [Secular Archontology of Hungary, 1000–1301] (in Hungarian). História, MTA Történettudományi Intézete. ISBN 978-963-9627-38-3.

Catholic Church titles
Preceded by Stephen Báncsa	Provost of Bács; 1242–1244	Succeeded by Job Záh
Preceded by Benedict Osl	Bishop of Várad; 1244–1258	Succeeded by Zosimus
