= Benedict Osl =

Hungarian bishop

- Bishop of Győr
- Appointed: 1243
- Term ended: 1244
- Predecessor: Gregory
- Successor: Artolf
- Other post: Bishop of Várad

Orders
- Consecration: 1231 by Ugrin Csák

Personal details
- Died: June/October 1244
- Parents: Osl I Osl
- Education: University of Paris

Benedict from the kindred Osl (Hungarian: Osl nembeli Benedek; died June/October 1244) was a Hungarian prelate in the 13th century, who served as Bishop of Várad from 1231 to 1243, then briefly Bishop of Győr from 1243 until his death. He was also called Benedict of Lendva (Hungarian: Lendvai Benedek).

== Family ==
Benedict was born into the gens (clan) Osl, which originated from Sopron County, but also acquired lands in Győr County. He was one of the seven sons of Osl I, the first known member of the kindred, who founded a Premonstratensian monastery in Csorna. Benedict's brothers were Beled, who was Master of the cupbearers in the court of Duke Béla and ancestor of the Vicai family, which existed until 1873; Osl II, who served as Master of the treasury and Ban of Severin, and was also ancestor of the Ostfi family; Herbord, an important royal courtier in the 1270s; Nicholas, who functioned as ispán of Győr County; Thomas, who did not hold any courtly positions, was forefather of the Csornai and Kanizsai noble families; and John, whose branch died out by the early 14th century.

== Career ==
Bishop Benedict [...] collected a sizeable army on the king's command and was about to march to his aid when he heard that the Tatars [Mongols] had destroyed the city of Eger. [...] Encouraged by the fact that he had a few days before attacked and defeated a minor group of them, he dismissed the troops and pursued the Tatars in order to recover bits of it lest they be lost. The Tatars, foreseeing that, feigned retreat and halted. Because they had many horses but not enough men, they devised and arranged this: they made puppets and many monstrous figures which they sat on the riderless horses as if they were warriors; then they lined up the horses at the foot of a hillock with some servants. They ordered that when they engaged the Hungarians in battle, the servants should lead the horses in battle line marching slowly towards them. They waited on the plain for the Hungarians. When these arrived, ispán Both and a few others [...] who were in the bishop's retinue, dropping the reins of their horses fought with them a tough battle. Since the Tatars were fewer in numbers, they feigned retreat and began to move towards the hillock. Then, when the ghost riders appeared from below the hill in battle line, as planned, the Hungarians thought that they had fallen into a trap, turned around and ran away fast. The Tatars now turned around, pursued them, struck them down and slew them, committing as much cruelty as possible. The bishop, however, returned with a few men to [Várad], stayed there a while to collect some troops, then crossed the Danube and escaped.

— Master Roger's Epistle to the Sorrowful Lament upon the Destruction of the Kingdom of Hungary by the Tatars

Benedict was born at the turn of the 12th and 13th centuries. He raised together with Duke Béla, who was a few years younger than him. As his father's third son, he entered ecclesiastical service. He attended the University of Paris. Thereafter, he bore the title of "magister". He served as lector of the cathedral chapter of Esztergom between 1225 and 1231. After the death Alexander, the majority of the cathedral chapter of Várad (present-day Oradea, Romania) elected Benedict as his successor around May 1231. His superior, Ugrin Csák, Archbishop of Kalocsa confirmed his election and consecrated him shortly thereafter. His candidacy was supported by his patron, Duke Béla, who administered Transylvania and other parts of Eastern Hungary, including Bihar County, where the diocese mostly laid. However, Pope Gregory IX contested Benedict's election and supported his subdeacon Primogenitus. Benedict remained in his position despite the pope's protest and investigations in the Roman Curia regarding his suitability and secular nepotism. Pope Gregory even excommunicated Benedict. Some canons still urged his removal during their visit in Rome in 1236. Pope Gregory considered Primogenitus as the lawful Bishop of Várad and allowed him to borrow 150 silver denari at the expense of the diocese.

Andrew II of Hungary, who died on 21 September 1235, was buried in Egres Abbey, which located in the territory of Benedict's diocese. Benedict became a staunch supporter of Béla IV, who ascended the Hungarian throne. After the death of Primogenitus, Pope Gregory acknowledged his bishopric and confirmed the election (although it was not required at that time). His diocese severely devastated during the Mongol invasion of Hungary in 1241. Güyük Khan invaded Transylvania from the Oituz Pass in March. Benedict gathered his army and marched out to the royal camp at the Sajó river, but a vanguard of Mongol marauders clashed with his army near Eger. Benedict defeated them, but another Mongol army forced him to withdraw to his episcopal seat, Várad. As one of his canons, Roger of Torre Maggiore preserved the events in his account Carmen Miserabile, the town was captured and devastated by the Mongols. Benedict gathered the remnants of his episcopal army and fled his diocese in order to seek refuge beyond the river Danube. Benedict never returned to the Diocese of Várad.

In Transdanubia, Benedict joined the royal accompaniment of Béla IV, who fled the disastrous Battle of Mohi from his Mongol pursuers. Béla and his royal court, including Benedict, took refugee in the well-fortified Trogir in Dalmatia. Benedict was elected Bishop of Győr in January 1243. Officially, he was styled as Bishop of Várad and postulated Bishop of Győr until June. Pope Innocent IV confirmed his translation from Várad to Győr on 11 July 1243. During his brief episcopate, the Diocese of Győr suffered from the frequent raids and plundering attacks of Frederick the Quarrelsome. Benedict died sometimes between June and October 1244.

== Sources ==
- B. Szabó, János (2016). "Az 1241. évi "tatárjárás" és Várad pusztulása az újabb kutatási eredmények tükrében [The "Passing of the Tatars" in 1241 and the Destruction of Várad in the Light of Recent Research]". In Zsoldos, Attila (ed.). Nagyvárad és Bihar az Árpád-kor végén (Tanulmányok Biharország történetéből 3.) (in Hungarian). Varadinum Kulturális Alapítvány. pp. 27–54. ISBN 978-973-0-21419-2.
- Bánk, József, ed. (1968). Győregyházmegyei almanach. Schematizmus Dioecesis Jaurinensis [Almanac of the Diocese of Győr] (in Hungarian). Authority of the Diocese of Győr.
- Farkas, Csaba (2018). ""In curia nostra educatus" Királyok udvarában: Osl nembeli Herbord pályafutása ["In nostra curia educatus". In the Kings' Court: the Career of Herbord Osl]". In Farkas, Csaba; et al. (eds.). Micae Mediaevales VII (in Hungarian). Eötvös Loránd University. pp. 31–47. ISBN 978-963-284-973-7.
- Győri, Éva (2008). "Győri püspökök a XIII. században [The Bishops of Győr in the 13th Century]". Belvedere Meridionale (in Hungarian). 20 (1–2): 24–43. ISSN 1419-0222.
- Master Roger's Epistle to the Sorrowful Lament upon the Destruction of the Kingdom of Hungary by the Tatars (Translated and Annotated by János M. Bak and Martyn Rady) (2010). In: Rady, Martyn; Veszprémy, László; Bak, János M. (2010); Anonymus and Master Roger; CEU Press; ISBN 978-9639776951.
- Zsoldos, Attila (2011). Magyarország világi archontológiája, 1000–1301 [Secular Archontology of Hungary, 1000–1301] (in Hungarian). História, MTA Történettudományi Intézete. ISBN 978-963-9627-38-3.

Benedict Genus Osl Born: 1200s Died: June/October 1244
Catholic Church titles
Preceded by Alexander	Bishop of Várad; 1231–1243	Succeeded by Vincent
Preceded by Gregory	Bishop of Győr; 1243–1244	Succeeded by Artolf
