= Osl =

Genus (gens) Osl
- Country: Kingdom of Hungary
- Founded: 12th century
- Founder: Osli I (descendant of Beled)
- Dissolution: 1873 (last Viczay), end of the 19th century (last male Vlaicu/Layko)
- Cadet branches: House of Kanizsai; House of Ostffy; House of Viczay; House of Csornay from the Temesköz (with many cadet branches, like the Layko/Vlaicu or the Dan/Dánfy of Duboz)

Osl (Osli, Osth or Ozsol) was the name of a gens (Latin for "clan"; nemzetség in Hungarian) with Hungarian origin in the Kingdom of Hungary, based in today's Győr-Moson-Sopron County and in the Banate of Severin. The village of Osli was named after that clan. Also the Oslea mountain in the former Banate of Severin.

== History ==
The Gesta Hunnorum et Hungarorum ("Deeds of the Huns and Hungarians") records that the clan was from one of the 108 original genera during the Hungarian Conquest of the Carpathian Basin. According to the legends, the forefather of the genus was Súr, a commander in the Battle of Lechfeld, son of Grand Prince Fajsz, thus a member of the Árpád dynasty. Beled, a son of Súr, married the daughter of duke Kolán and helped his father-in-law against the latter's brother, duke Kean. Duke Beled, as told in the Chronicon Pictum, was the one who arranged the marriage between the Grand Prince Géza and Sárolt of Transylvania. The eponymous ancestor of the clan was Osli I, descendant of Beled and of duke Kolán's daughter, who lived around between 1200 and 1230. Presumably, he had seven children, including Beled, who served as Master of the cupbearers, whose eldest son, Beled was the ancestor of the Count Viczay family which became extinct in 1873.

Osli's second son was Osli de Asszonyfalva, Ban of Szörény, whose third son, Osli Ostffy became ancestor of the Ostffy de Asszonyfalva family. The third son was Benedek, Bishop of Várad (today: Oradea, Romania). He survived the Mongol invasion of Europe and later was appointed Bishop of Győr. The fourth son, Tamás de Csorna was the first member of the House of Kanizsai. His grandson Gergely acquired significant lands in Győr County. He was received Rábaszentmiklós by Ladislaus IV in 1287. However, he had no male successors, thus the property were inherited by Lőrinc, Ispán of Zala County, his brother's sons. The last surviving member of that family was Orsolya Kanizsai (d. 1571), wife of Palatine Tamás Nádasdy.

The fifth son was Herbold, Ispán (Count; comes) of Baranya County. After the Battle of Mohi (1241), he put in safety Béla IV and the royal family at Klis Fortress (Hungarian: Klissza) who fled from the Mongols to Dalmatia. During that time, Herbold served as castellan of Klis who defended successfully from the Tatars. As a result, later, Béla IV donated large estates along the Raba.

== Family tree ==
- N
  - Osl I (fl. 1200–1230)
    - Beled I (fl. 1216–1236)
    - Osl II (fl. 1216–1246)
    - Benedict (fl. 1225–1244†)
    - Thomas I (fl. 1228–1248)
    - Herbord I (fl. 1230–1279; d. before 1280)
    - Nicholas I (fl. 1237–1239)
    - John I (fl. 1238–1250)
  - Maurice I (fl. 1228–1230) → Zemenyei branch

== Sources ==
- János Karácsonyi: A magyar nemzetségek a XIV. század közepéig. Budapest: Magyar Tudományos Akadémia. 1900–1901.
- August Ernst: Geschichte des Burgenlandes. Verlag für Geschichte u. Politik, Wien 1991, ISBN 3-7028-0311-4
- Gyula Kristó (editor): Korai Magyar Történeti Lexikon - 9-14. század (Encyclopedia of the Early Hungarian History - 9-14th centuries); Akadémiai Kiadó, 1994, Budapest; ISBN 963-05-6722-9.
