= Zosimus (bishop of Várad) =

Hungarian prelate

- Bishop of Várad
- Installed: 1259
- Term ended: 1265/1268
- Predecessor: Vincent
- Successor: Lodomer

Personal details
- Died: after 1265
- Buried: Esztergom Basilica
- Denomination: Roman Catholic

Zosimus (Hungarian: Zozimás; died after 1265) was a Hungarian prelate in the mid-13th century, who served as Bishop of Várad (present-day Oradea, Romania) from 1259 to 1265.

== Career ==
Zosimus originated from a noble family which possessed lands in Somogy County. He studied in the ecclesiastical lyceum in Esztergom, where he spent his childhood.

According to the cathedral chapter's list of suffragans, Zosimus was elected bishop in 1259, succeeding Vincent, who died in the previous year. His name first appears in contemporary documents in 1263. Based on the data of the contemporary Regestrum Varadinense, the trials by fire ceased to exist under Zosimus' episcopal tenure. He continued his predecessor's agricultural activity in order to revive the economy and cultural life of the Diocese of Várad after the first Mongol invasion of Hungary. Under Zosimus, the chapter's importance gradually increased.

Zosimus' episcopal tenure covered the period of tensions between King Béla IV of Hungary and his son Duke Stephen. In the emerging conflict, the bishop supported the younger king because the territory of the diocese laid in the latter's realm according to the 1262 treaty. Stephen visited the episcopal see in early 1263, during Mardi Gras. Zosimus resided in Stephen's court in Bereg during Christmas celebrations in late 1263. On his way to return Várad, Zosimus stopped at the fort of Privartus Gutkeled in Gacsály, Szatmár County in early 1264, where approved and wrote down the last will and testament of Privartus' wife.

Having fallen seriously ill, Zosimus compiled his own last will and testament in Esztergom on 25 May 1264. In the document, he bequeathed his estate Bere in Somogy County to the Archdiocese of Esztergom. In accordance with his will, he was buried in the Esztergom Basilica. When Béla IV confirmed the last will on 17 October 1265, the king referred to Zosimus as a still living person, who donated the aforementioned estate to the cathedral chapter of Esztergom five days earlier, for being properly cared for during his illness. Zosimus was succeeded by the skilled and influential prelate Lodomer as Bishop of Várad in 1268 at the latest.

== Sources ==
- Bunyitay, Vince (1883). A váradi püspökség története alapításától a jelenkorig [A History of the Diocese of Várad from the Foundation until Present] (in Hungarian).
- Zsoldos, Attila (2011). Magyarország világi archontológiája, 1000–1301 [Secular Archontology of Hungary, 1000–1301] (in Hungarian). História, MTA Történettudományi Intézete. ISBN 978-963-9627-38-3.

Catholic Church titles
Preceded by Vincent	Bishop of Várad; 1259–1265	Succeeded by Lodomer
