= József Tempfli =

Hungarian Roman Catholic bishop

His Excellency József Tempfli
- Bishop of Oradea Mare
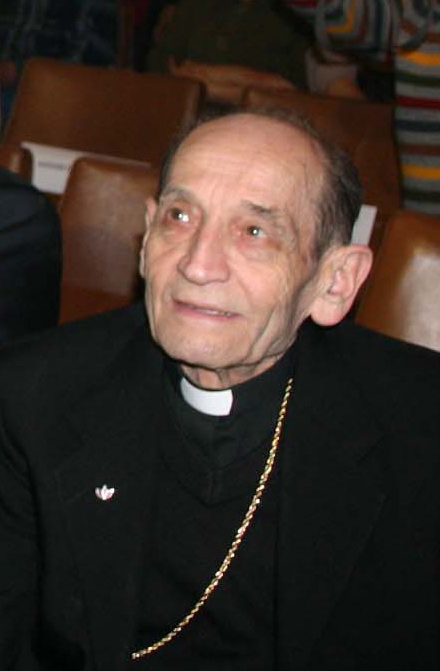
- Image: László Horváth
- Church: Roman Catholic
- Diocese: Roman Catholic Diocese of Oradea Mare
- Appointed: 23 December 2008
- Installed: 1990
- Term ended: 2009
- Predecessor: János Scheffler
- Successor: László Böcskei

Personal details
- Born: April 9, 1931 (age 95) Cenaloș, Kingdom of Romania
- Died: May 25, 2016 (aged 85) Oradea
- Denomination: Catholic Church, Romania

József Tempfli (April 9, 1931 – May 25, 2016) was a Hungarian Roman Catholic bishop. He was born into an ethnic Hungarian family. Ordained to the priesthood in 1962, Tempfli served as bishop of the Roman Catholic Diocese of Oradea Mare from 1990 until 2008.
