= László Böcskei =

Romanian Roman Catholic bishop (born 1965)

His Excellency László Bőcskei
- Bishop of Oradea Mare
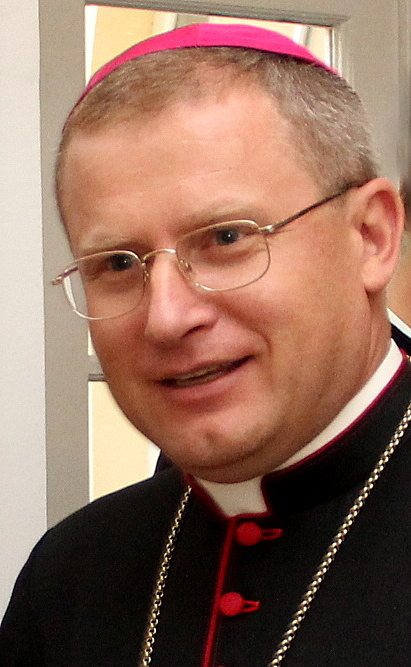
- Church: Roman Catholic
- Diocese: Roman Catholic Diocese of Oradea Mare
- Appointed: 23 December 2008
- Installed: 7 March 2009
- Predecessor: József Tempfli

Orders
- Ordination: 24 June 1990 by Sebastian Kräuter
- Consecration: 7 March 2009 by Martin Roos

Personal details
- Born: July 11, 1965 (age 60) Gătaia, Romania
- Coat of arms

László Böcskei (Hungarian pronunciation: [ˈlaːsloː ˈbøt͡ʃkɛi]; born July 11, 1965) is a Romanian cleric, bishop of the Roman Catholic Diocese of Oradea Mare. Born into an ethnic Hungarian family in Gătaia (Gátalja), Timiș County, he studied at the Roman Catholic Theological Institute of Alba Iulia. He was ordained in June 1990 by Bishop Sebastian Kräuter and assigned to the Timișoara Diocese. He served as assistant priest at a Timișoara parish before being assigned to the city's St. George Cathedral. In 2006, having reached the age of 75, József Tempfli announced his intention to retire as Bishop of Oradea Mare, and Pope Benedict XVI chose Böcskei as his successor. He was consecrated bishop in March 2009.
