= Beled Viczay =

Hungarian nobleman (c. 1237 – c. 1291)

- Born: c. 1237
- Died: c. 1291

Beled Viczay de Loós (c. 1237 – c. 1291) was a Hungarian nobleman, the first provable member of the Viczay de Loós family (later Baron, then Count de Loós et Hédervár). The house extinct in 1873.

Beled was from the gens Osl (or Osli), as the eldest son of Beled, who served as Master of the Cup-bearers.
