= Demetrius Futaki =

Demetrius Futaki (Hungarian: Futaki Demeter) (d. 1372) was a Bishop of Várad (Oradea) between 1345 and 1372.

== Life ==
He was born in the village Mézes in Zemplén county in the early 14th century. In 1324 he was canon of Buda. In 1331 he was subcollector and canon of Várad. In these decades he was the rector of the seminary of Várad and the Queen's chaplain. On 15 July 1345 he became the bishop of Várad.

== Role in politics ==
Demetrius was ambassador several times to Moldavia, Italy and Avignon.
