= János Vaszary =

Hungarian painter and graphic artist

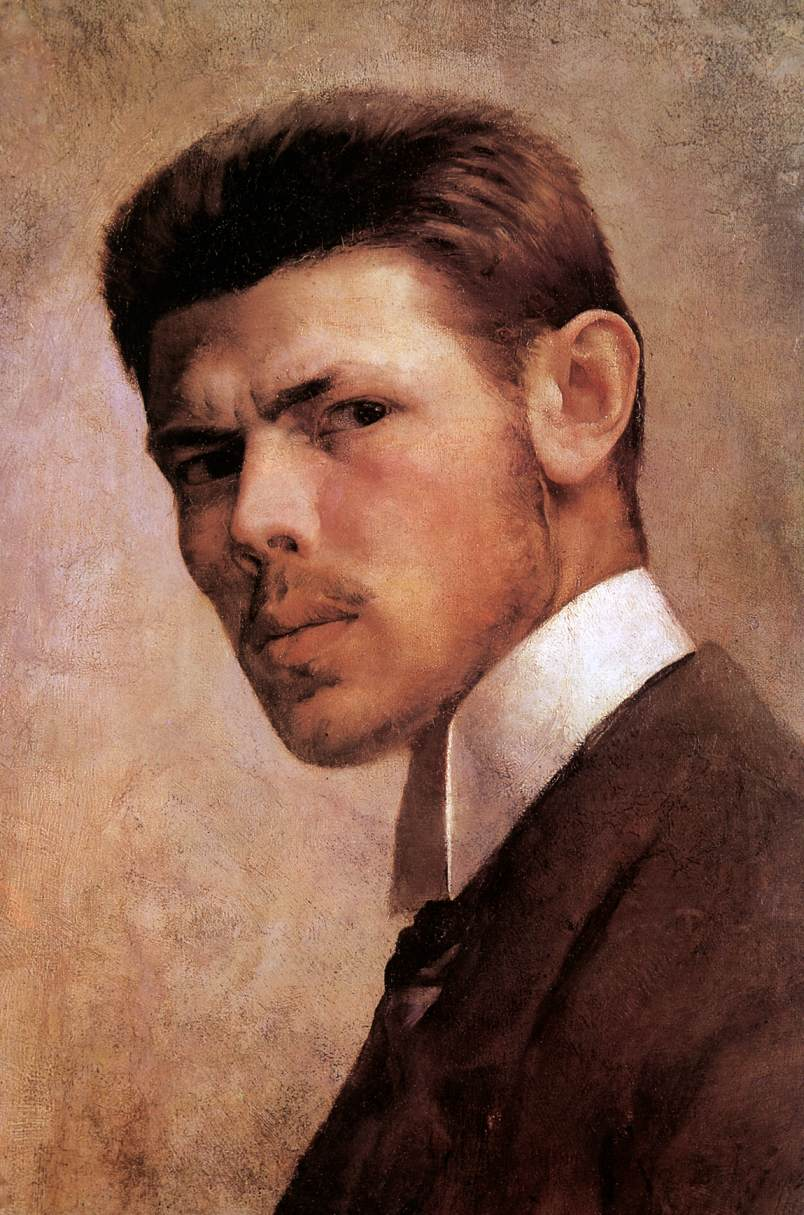
- Self-portrait (1887)
- Born: János Miklós Vaszary; November 30, 1867; Kaposvár, Kingdom of Hungary
- Died: April 19, 1939 (aged 71); Budapest, Kingdom of Hungary
- Resting place: Tata, Hungary
- Education: Académie Julian (1899–)
- Alma mater: Hungarian University of Fine Arts
- Occupation: Artist

János Miklós Vaszary (30 November 1867 – 19 April 1939) was a Hungarian painter and graphic artist.

== Biography ==
He was born into a prominent Catholic family in Kaposvár. His uncle was Kolos Ferenc Vaszary, the Archbishop of Esztergom. His art studies began at the Hungarian University of Fine Arts under János Greguss. In 1887, he went to Munich, where he studied with Gabriel von Hackl and Ludwig von Löfftz. After seeing an exhibition of paintings by Jules Bastien-Lepage, he moved to Paris in 1899 and enrolled at the Académie Julian. Although he later became involved with Simon Hollósy and the artists' colony in Nagybánya and developed an interest in Hungarian folk art, his primary influences would always be French.

In 1905 one of his paintings (The Sharecropper) was purchased by Emperor Franz Joseph. Vaszary was married later that year.

During World War I, he served as a correspondent on the Serbian front and his imagery became more dramatic but, after another visit to Paris, he returned to his Impressionist tendencies. From 1920 until his retirement in 1932, he served as a professor at his alma mater, the University of Fine Arts. In 1924, he was one of the founders of the "Képzőművészek Új Társasága" (New Society of Artists, whose acronym "KÚT" means "fountain" in Hungarian). In 1926, he was commissioned to paint murals at the Biological Institute in Tihany.

When he retired, he had already been suffering from heart disease for several years so, as it worsened, he made plans to settle permanently in the rural village of Tata, where he owned a villa and had spent many summers painting. These plans were thwarted by his sudden death, in Budapest, but Tata still became his final resting place. A street and an elementary school there are named after him.

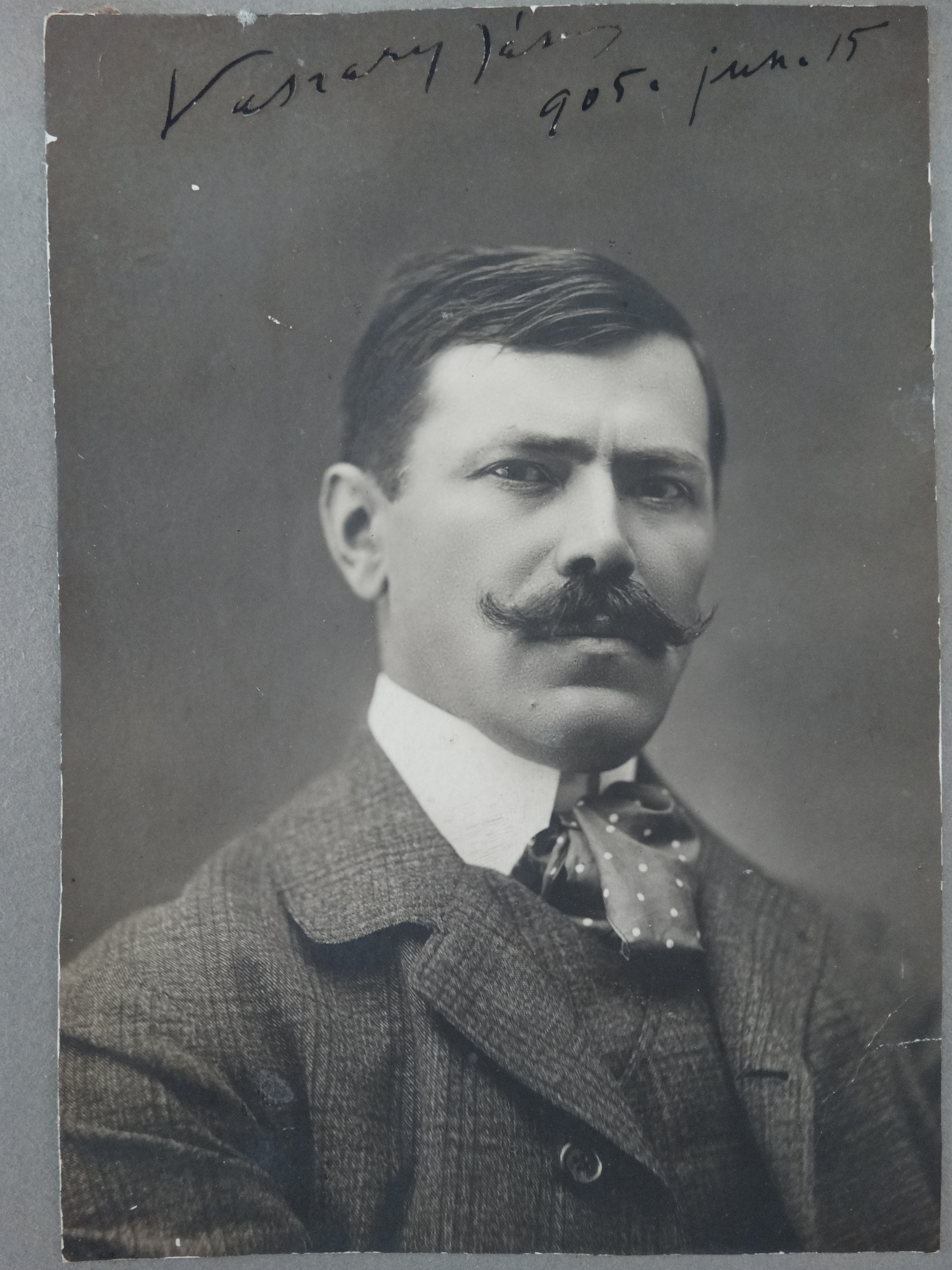
Vaszary in 1905

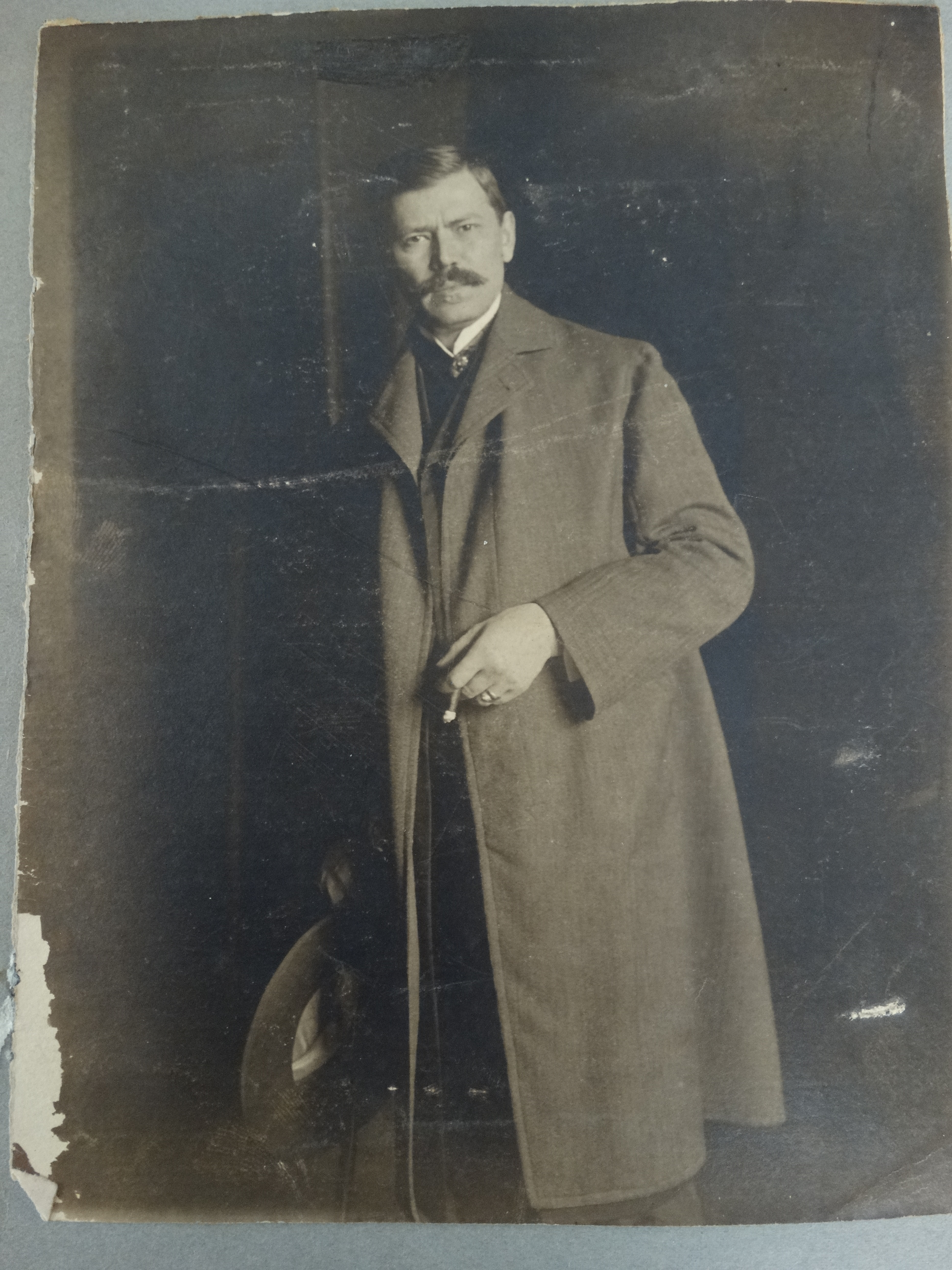
Undated photograph of Vaszary

== Selected paintings ==
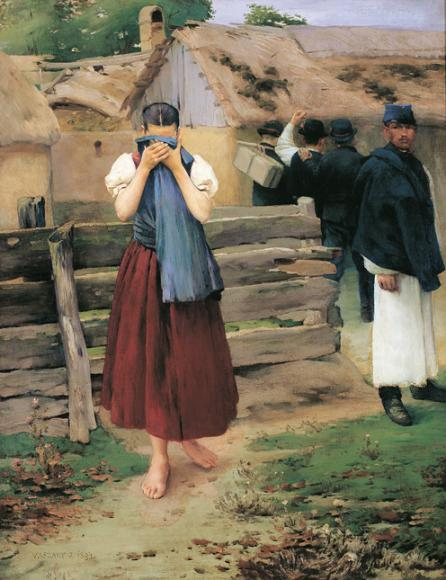
The Command Has Arrived (Farewell!), 1894

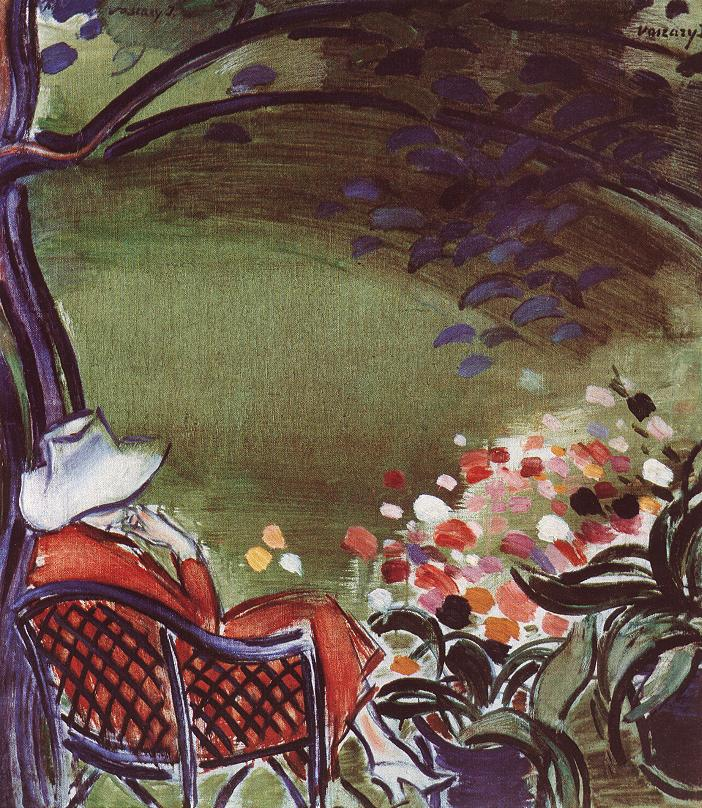
Woman Sitting in the Garden (c.1930)

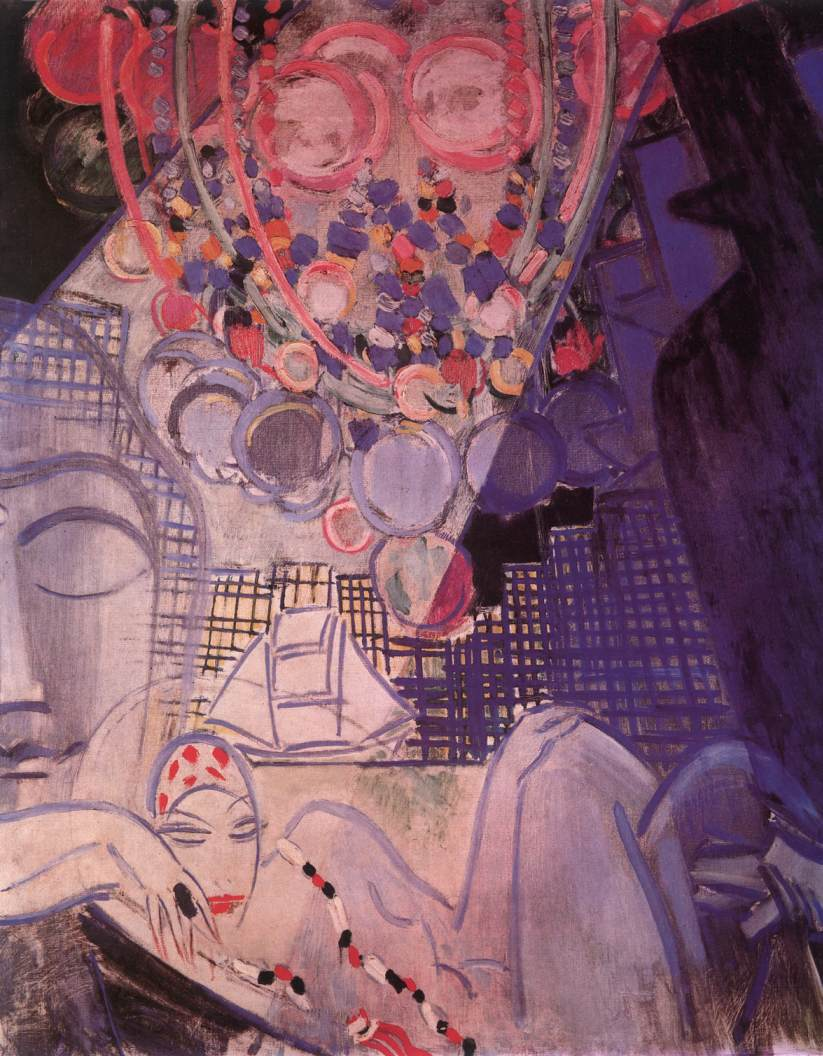
The Morphinist (c.1930)

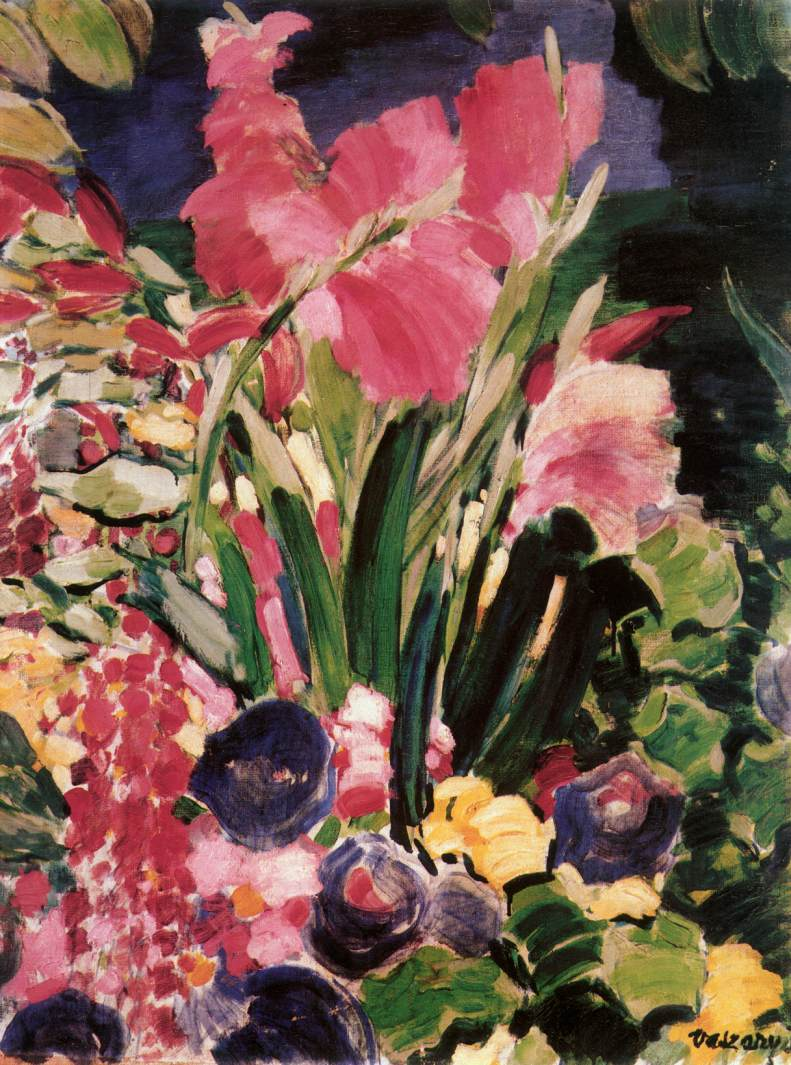
Gladioli (1938)

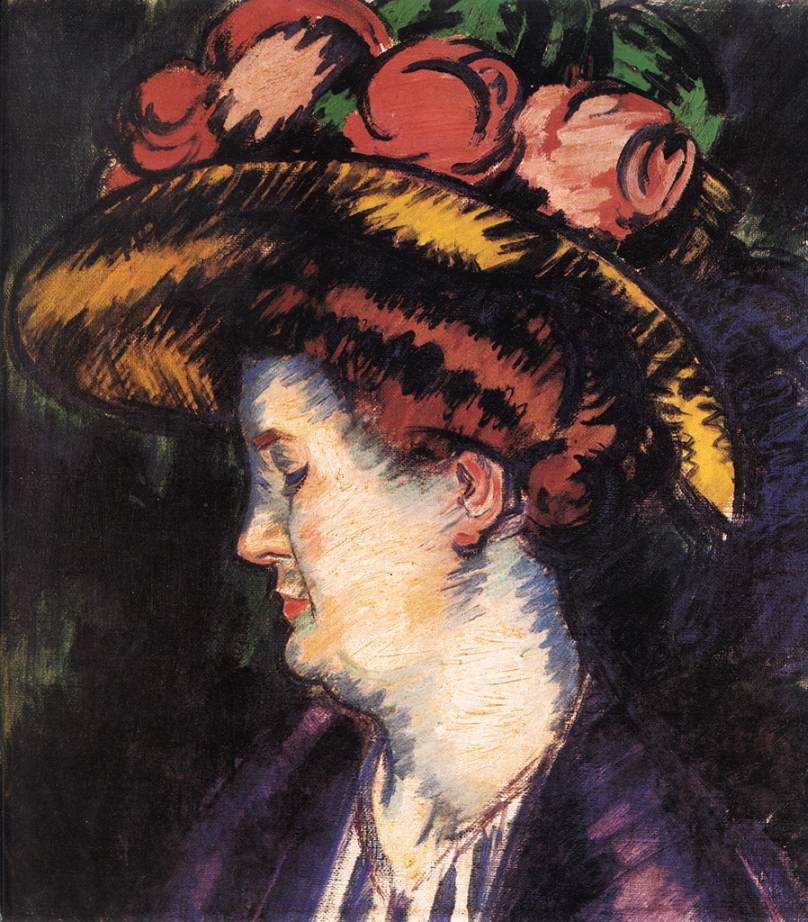
The Artist's Wife
(date unknown)
