= Imre Csáky (cardinal) =

Hungarian Roman Catholic cardinal

Imre Cardinal Csáky †
- Cardinal priest of Sant'Eusebio; Archbishop of Kalocsa
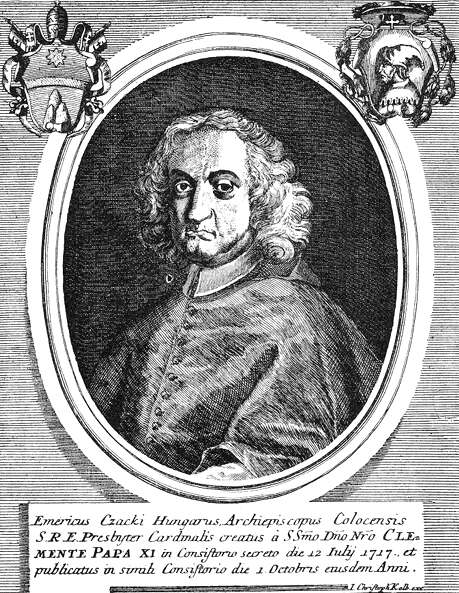
- See: Archdiocese of Kalocsa
- Installed: 19 November 1714–28 August 1732
- Other post: Previously Bishop of Nagyvárad

Orders
- Ordination: 18 December 1694
- Created cardinal: 12 July 1717 by Pope Clement XI

Personal details
- Born: 28 October 1672 Szepes Castle, Kingdom of Hungary (now Slovakia)
- Died: 28 August 1732 (aged 59) Nagyvárad, Kingdom of Hungary (now Romania)
- Education: Collegium Pazmaneum; MA, 1691; PhD, 1693; Collegio Germanico-Hungarico, DTh, 1695

Imre Csáky (28 October 1672 – 28 August 1732) was a Hungarian Roman Catholic cardinal.

== Biography ==
Imre Csáky was born to Count István Csáky and Klára Melith in Szepes Castle (today Spiš in Slovakia), a fief of his family. He studied in Košice, Vienna and Rome and was ordained priest, starting his ecclesiastical career in Eger and then in Košice and Esztergom. In 1703 he was appointed abbot of Szent Gothárdi.

On 25 June 1703, he was elected bishop of Nagyvárad (present Oradea, Romania). On 19 November 1714, he was promoted metropolitan archbishop of Archdiocese of Kalocsa and held the Nagyvárad diocese as apostolic administrator until his death.

Csáky was created cardinal priest in pectore in the consistory of 12 July 1717 by Pope Clement XI with the title of Sant'Eusebio. He took part in the Papal conclave of 1721, but not in those of 1724 and 1730. He died in 1732 in a castle he had built near Nagyvárad.
