= Jusztinián György Serédi =

Hungarian Roman Catholic cardinal

His Eminence Jusztinián György Serédi O.S.B.
- Cardinal, Archbishop of Esztergom; Primate of Hungary
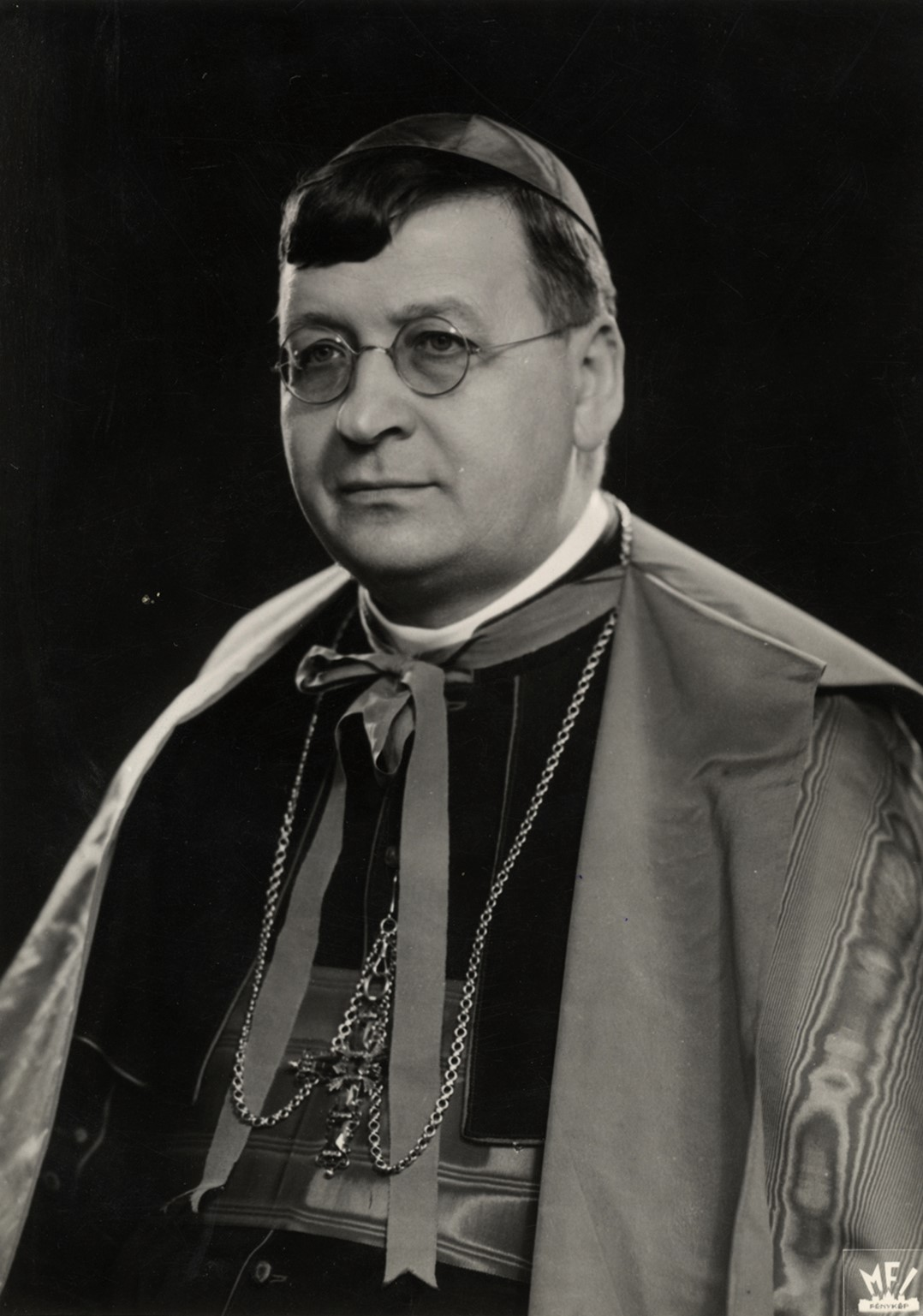
- Serédi in 1940
- Church: Roman Catholic
- Archdiocese: Esztergom
- See: Esztergom
- Appointed: 30 November 1927
- In office: 1928-1945
- Predecessor: János Csernoch
- Successor: József Mindszenty
- Other post: Cardinal-Priest of Santi Andrea e Gregorio al Monte Celio

Orders
- Ordination: 14 July 1908
- Consecration: 8 January 1928 by Pius XI
- Created cardinal: 19 December 1927 by Pius XI
- Rank: Cardinal-Priest

Personal details
- Born: György Szapucsek; April 23, 1884 Deáki, Austria-Hungary (Present-day Diakovce, Slovakia)
- Died: March 29, 1945 (aged 60) Esztergom, Kingdom of Hungary
- Buried: Esztergom Basilica
- Education: Anselmianum (PhD)
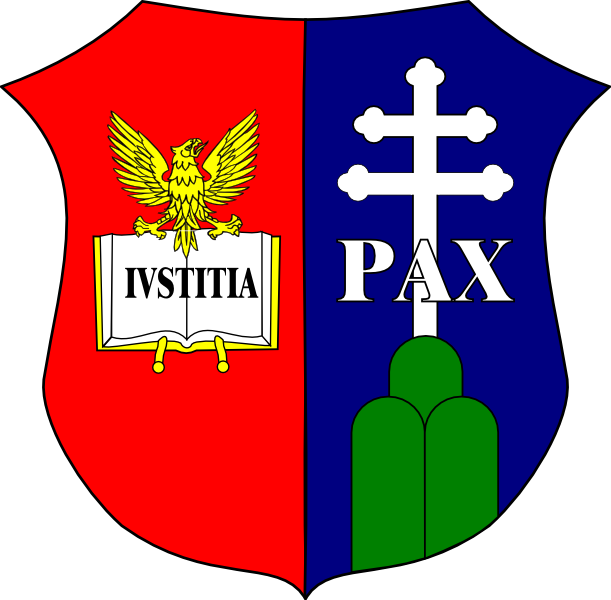
- Coat of arms

Styles of Jusztinián György Serédi
- Reference style: His Eminence
- Spoken style: Your Eminence
- Informal style: Cardinal
- See: Esztergom

Jusztinián György Serédi OSB (né Szapucsek; 23 April 1884 – 29 March 1945) was a Cardinal of the Roman Catholic Church and Archbishop of Esztergom and Prince Primate of Hungary. He helped save many thousands of Polish refugees, including thousands of Polish Jews, by helping Henryk Sławik and his associates, like József Antall Senior.

Jusztinián György Serédi was born in Deáki, Hungary (now Diakovce, Slovakia). He joined the Order of Saint Benedict on 6 August 1901, Pannonhalma. He was professed on July 10, 1905. He was ordained on 14 July 1908. He was a member of the community of the abbey of Pannonhalma and faculty member of the International College S. Anselmo, Rome. He was procurator general of his order in Rome.

== Episcopate ==
Pope Pius XI appointed him Archbishop of Esztergom on 30 November 1927. He was consecrated on 8 January 1928 in the Sistine Chapel by Pope Pius XI.

== Cardinalate ==
He was made Cardinal-Priest of Ss. Andrea e Gregorio al Monte Celio in the consistory of December 19, 1927. He was a senator in the parliament of Hungary by his own right. He participated in the conclave of 1939 that elected Pope Pius XII. In May 1938, he played a key role in the XXXXIV World Eucharistic Congress held in Budapest to honor the death of St. Istvan in 1038. When Bishop Eugenio Pacelli (the future Pius XII), the Vatican state secretary arrived via train in Budapest on 23 May 1938, he was greeted at the station by delegation that consisted of Serédi along with the Regent of Hungary, Admiral Miklós Horthy, the prime minister Béla Imrédy, the foreign minister Kálmán Kánya and the Minister of Culture Pál Teleki. The World Eucharistic Congress was widely seen at the time and since as an endorsement of Horthy's regime by the Roman Catholic Church as Pacelli honored Horthy and his hosts. Horthy was a Calvinist, but his wife Magdonlna Purgy was Catholic. In his speech before the World Eucharistic Congress, Pacellis praised Horthy as a defender of European Christian civilization for the way his regime had banned the Hungarian Communist Party and taken a fierce anti-Communist stance. Pacelli praised Horthy for having supposedly overthrown the Hungarian Soviet Republic in 1919, ignoring the fact that the Hungarian Soviet Republic had in fact been overthrown after losing a war with Romania in August 1919. Despite the fact that it was not true that Horthy had overthrown the Hungarian Soviet Republic, throughout the entire Horthy, the claim was made that the Soviet Republic had been overthrown by him. The World Eucharistic Congress served as a forum for promoting Hungarian revanchism as several speakers at the congress in honoring the memory of St. Istvan called for reuniting the lands of the Crown of St. Istvan (i.e undoing the Treaty of Trianon).

== World War Two ==
He served in Hungary's Upper Chamber of Parliament and voted in favour of antisemitic legislation first passed in 1938. In 1938 Serédi hosted an Ecumenical Congress along with the future Pius XII.

On 15 May 1939, as a member of the Upper Chamber, he along with the Catholic Archbishop of Szeged, Gyula Glatterfelder, voted for the second anti-Jewish law passed by the prime minister Pál Teleki, which limited Jews to holding only 6% of the jobs in any given profession and stripped most Jews of the right to vote. In his speech in Parliament on the law, his only objection was that the law defined Jews as a race instead of a religion, which he complained meant that Jewish converts to Roman Catholicism were subject to the same discriminatory treatment as Hungarian Jews. In 1941, Serédi voted for the Third Anti-Jewish Law passed by the prime minister László Bárdossy which banned marriage and sex between Christians and Jews. Again, Serédi in his speech on the law in the Upper Chamber expressed support for law with his only objection to the law being that it defined Jews as a racial group, which adversely impacted on Jews who converted to Catholicism.

In 1939, after the September Invasion of Poland by Germany, at least 150,000 Polish refugees, both civilians and military, found sanctuary in Hungary, and the refugees included thousands of Polish Jews. Responding to the crisis, cardinal Serédi helped organize service for the refugees, ordering Hungarian Church officials to get actively involved in the religious and charitable services in the Polish refugee camps, among others he was instrumental in organizing a school and foster home for the Jewish children, eventually saved through the efforts of Henryk Sławik and his Polish and Hungarian associates. He is said to have quoted 1 John 4:18 "timor non est in caritate sed perfecta caritas foras mittit timorem quoniam timor poenam habet qui autem timet non est perfectus in caritate," when referring to his Polish and Jewish wards.

In a speech given to mark the end of 1942 on 31 December 1942, Serédi called for the prime minister Miklós Kállay to follow Hungarian interests even it meant breaking alliances with former friends, a clear reference to the alliance with Germany. Towards the end of January 1943, Kállay had a three-man delegation consisting of the former prime minister István Bethlen, Cardinal Serédi and Chief Justice Géza Töreki of the Supreme Court to meet the Regent of Hungary, Admiral Miklós Horthy at the Royal Castle. Horthy was a Calvinist aristocrat, but his wife was Catholic, and it was believed by the Catholic nobleman Kállay that Serédi would have influence on the regent. Bethlen, Cardinal Serédi and Justice Töreki presented to the regent a three point memo, which advised Horthy that he should:

- "Request the withdrawal as soon as possible of the Hungarian fighting forces from the [Eastern] front".
- "Reinforce the army at home in expectation of a power vacuum after the war".
- "Urgently reestablish constitutional rights and respect for the law, including punishment of the military responsible for the atrocities at Újvidék [modern Novi Sad] as well as implementation of Jewish laws in the spirit of humanity and Christianity".

Most notably, the memo did not call for the repeal of the anti-Jewish laws passed between 1938-1942, but called only for the "implementation of Jewish laws in the spirit of humanity and Christianity" with the clear implication being the Jewish laws were acceptable to the three co-authors of the memo as long as the laws were executed in "the spirt of humanity and Christianity". However, the fact that the memo called for those Honved officers responsible for the "Cold Days" of the Novi Sad raid in January 1942, which saw about 3, 000 Serbs and Jews massacred indicated a strong disapproval of violence against Jews. In March 1943, Serédi's New Year speech was republished in a Catholic newspaper, which led to the German minister plenipotentiary Dietrich von Jagow making a formal protest against the "defeatist" article. When Kállay visited Rome in early April 1943 to see the Pope Pius XII and asked him to pass along a message to the governments of the United States and the United Kingdom saying that Hungary wanted to sign an armistice, Serédi wrote a letter to the pope explaining the true purpose of Kállay's visit.

On 19 March 1944, Germany occupied Hungary, which led to the extension of the "Final Solution to the Jewish Question" to Hungary. The SS team led by Adolf Eichmann established a Judenrat (Jewish Council) made of Jewish community leaders to help organise the deportations of the Hungarian Jews to the Auschwitz-Birnkeau death camp. The member of the Judenrat responsible for Jewish converts to Christianity, Sándor Török, wrote Serédi asking him to excommunicate all Hungarian Catholics involved in the deportations. In his reply, Serédi wrote: "If His Holiness the Pope does nothing against Hitler, what can I do in my narrower jurisdiction?"

In the spring of 1944 he issued a statement condemning the attacks on, discrimination against and deportation of the Jews on racial grounds. Serédi also worked to try to get Catholic Jews exempted from deportation and death, but was only able to get the rule to apply to those who were priests, monks or nuns. In early April 1944, the Jewish Council that had been created after the German occupation on 19 March 1944 appealed to help from the three heads of the most important churches in Hungary, namely Cardinal Serédi, Bishop Laszlo Ravasz of the Calvinist Synod of Hungary and Bela Kapi of the Lutheran Church of Hungary. The three main churches in Hungary instead focused on having Jewish converts to Christianity exempt from the racial laws which defined Judaism as a race instead of a religion and expressed less concern about helping Jews proper. On 5 April 1944, Serédi met with the prime minister, General Döme Sztójay who told him that Jews who had converted to Catholicism would be subject to the racial laws he was imposing, but he would exempt those Jewish converts who had become Catholic priests, monks and nuns in exchange for Serédi staying silent on the deportations of Jews to Auschwitz. On 13 April and again on 23 April 1944, Cardinal Serédi met Sztójay to complain about the way his government treated Jewish converts to Catholicism, but Sztójay told him that he should focus on praying for a victory over "Bolshevism" instead. At the end of April 1944, Bishop Ravasz of the Calvinist Synod proposed that the three main churches all issued a joint statement condemning the genocide in Hungary, an offer that Serédi rejected. The American historian Deborah Cornelius wrote that Serédi was sincerely opposed to the genocide in Hungary, but that he was a "cautions" man who believed that a public protest might lead to the executions of Hungarian Catholics, including quite possibly himself. Serédi's stance led to a vigorous debate within the Hungarian Catholic Church with several bishops such as Vilmos Apor and Janos Mikes saying that the Catholic Church should unequivocally condemn the genocide and that Serédi's silence on the issue was unacceptable. As Serédi would not sign the joint letter, both Ravasz on behalf of the Hungarian Reformed Church and Kapi on behalf of the Lutheran Church issued a joint letter condemning the deportations.

In April 1944 Serédi protested the treatment of Jews by the Nazis in Hungary. On the other hand, he did not make any public condemnation available to Catholics inside Hungary against the deportation of the Hungarian Jews to Auschwitz. Much like the pope, Serédi believed that criticsing Nazi Germany would only make matters worse by leading to Nazi persecution of Catholics while doing nothing to save the Jews. Serédi, while being opposed to the Holocaust, placed more value of Hungarian Catholic lives than he did on Hungarian Jewish lives, hence his decision to stay silent on the genocide in Hungary. The papal nuncio in Budapest, Angelo Rotta, was deeply critical of Serédi for not speaking out and in his letters to Serédi implied that he was a coward. On 15 June 1944, Ravasz wrote to Serédi saying that the two clergymen should meet to issue a joint ecumenical statement condemning the deportations. Serédi wrote back to Ravasz saying that he wished to maintain his silence on the deportations and moreover had no interest in any co-operation with Protestants. On 23 June 1944, Ravasz along with 9 other bishops of the Reformed Church issued a public statement asking for Sztójay to stop deportations. Sztójay did not respond to the appeal from the Reformed Church and the deportations, but at the same time none of the Reformed Church's leaders were executed, which was Serédi's usual reason he gave for not speaking out. On June 29, 1944, he decided against issuing a pastoral letter clarifying the view of the church on this issue. On 29 June 1944, Cardinal Serédi, under pressure from his bishops, wrote a pastoral letter that criticised the deportations of the Jews as against divine law and demanded the deportations stop immediately. Serédi however qualified his criticism in his pastoral letter by saying that Hungarian Jews had a negative influence on the economy, society and sexuality and that he felt some sort of anti-Semitic laws were needed, but just not the current ones. Sztójay met with Cardinal Serédi and promised him he would investigate the reports that the Jews being deported were all being exterminated and to stop the deportations if that were true in exchange for the pastoral letter not being issued, an offer Serédi promptly accepted.

In 1944, two bishops and several priests and nuns were arrested. One of the bishops arrested by the Nazis was József Mindszenty. He considered the inauguration of Ferenc Szálasi illegal and refused to participate on his oath taking as the "Leader of the Nation". However, Serédi recognised Szálasi as he ordered all Catholic priests and Catholic school teachers to serve the new Arrow Cross regime. He died in Esztergom in 1945 while still in office.

== Books ==
- Cornelius, Deborah S. (2011). Hungary in World War II Caught in the Cauldron. New York: Fordham University Press. ISBN 9780823237739.
- Perin, Raffaella (2024). The Popes on Air The History of Vatican Radio from Its Origins to World War II. New York: Fordham University Press. ISBN 9781531507176.

Catholic Church titles
Preceded by János Csernoch	Archbishop of Esztergom; 30 November 1927 – 29 March 1945	Succeeded by József Mindszenty
