= János Csernoch =

His Eminence János Csernoch
- Cardinal, Archbishop of Esztergom; Primate of Hungary
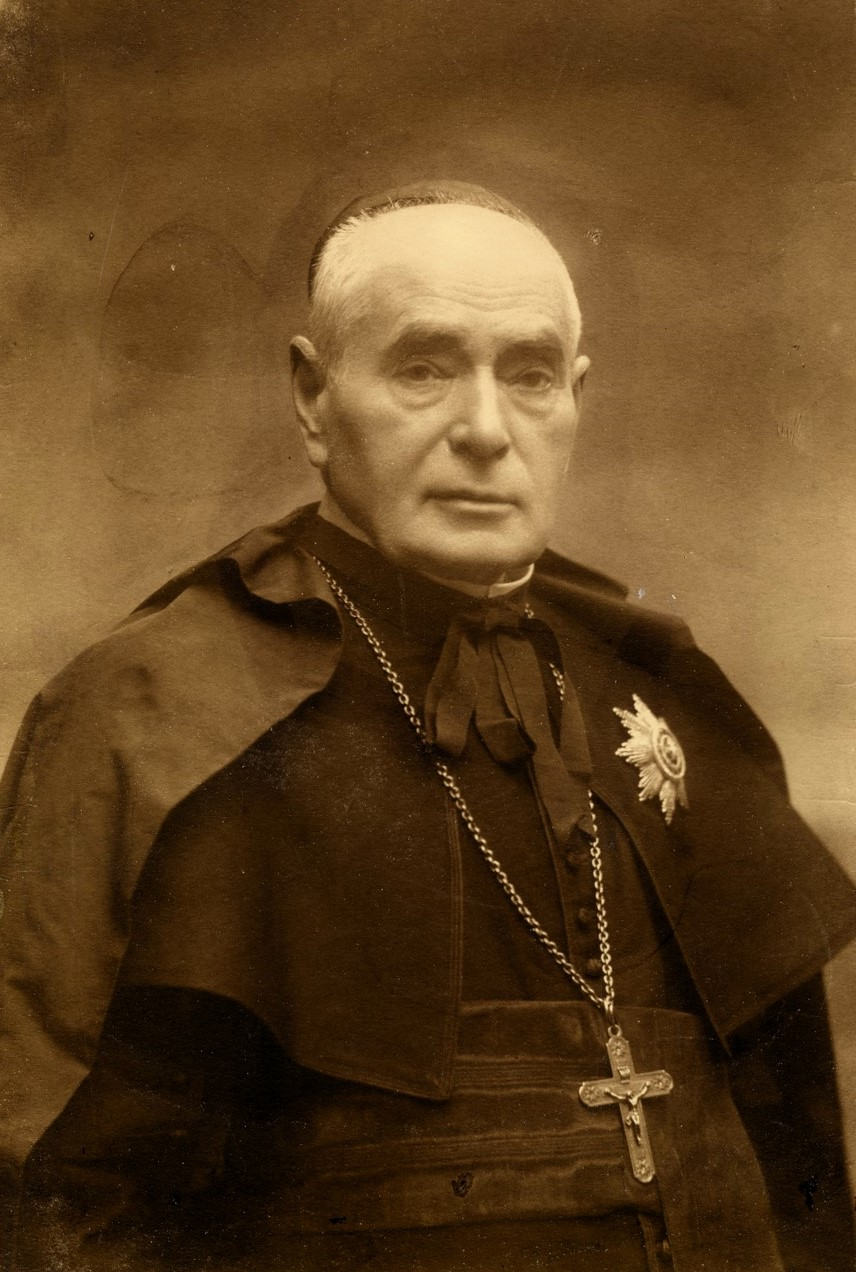
- See: Archdiocese of Esztergom
- Installed: 13 December 1912 – 25 July 1927
- Predecessor: Kolos Ferenc Vaszary
- Successor: Jusztinián György Serédi, O.S.B.
- Other post: Previously Archbishop of Kalocsa

Orders
- Ordination: 18 November 1874
- Consecration: 10 May 1908 by Károly Hornig
- Created cardinal: 25 May 1914 by Pope Pius X

Personal details
- Born: 18 June 1852 Szakolcza, Kingdom of Hungary, Austrian Empire, (today Skalica, Slovakia)
- Died: 25 July 1927 (aged 75) Esztergom, Hungary

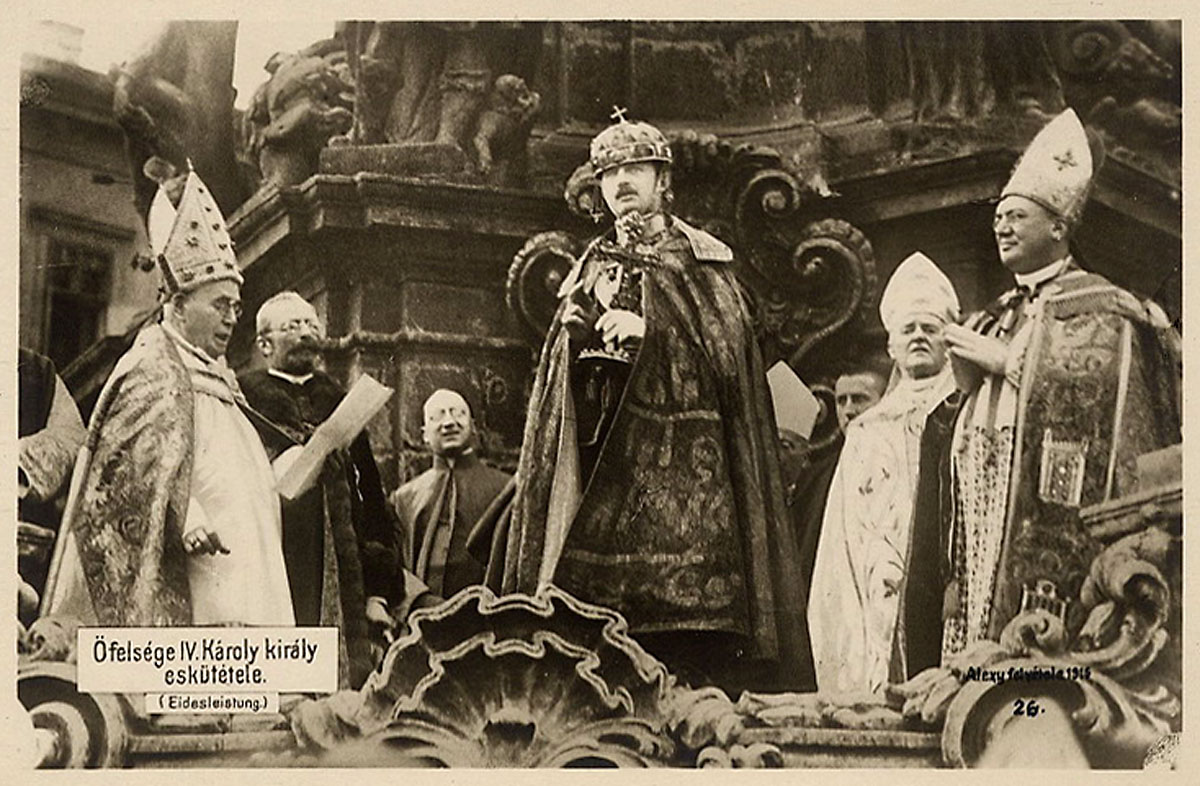
Cardinal Csernoch (left) and King Charles IV at Holy Trinity Column, Budapest, after the monarch's coronation on 30 December 1916

János Csernoch (Slovak: Ján Černoch) S.T.D. (18 June 1852 – 25 July 1927) was a Cardinal of the Roman Catholic Church and Archbishop of Esztergom and Primate of Hungary.

János Csernoch was born in Szakolcza, Kingdom of Hungary (now Skalica, Slovakia). He received minor orders on 22 July 1874, the subdiaconate on 23 July 1874 and the diaconate on 24 July 1874. He was educated at the Collegium Pázmáneum in Vienna and the University of Vienna, where he earned a doctorate in theology on 2 June 1876.

In spite of his Slovak ethnic origin and family relations to several Slovak national activists his attitude to the Slovak national movement was ambivalent. He financially supported some Slovak activities and published articles in Slovak newspapers but after 1910 he supported the integrity of the Kingdom of Hungary.

To date, he is the last Archbishop of Esztergom to have crowned a King of Hungary.

== Priesthood ==
He was ordained on 18 November 1874. He successively held positions, within the Archdiocese of Esztergom, as professor of theology and biblical studies at the Seminary of Esztergom; librarian and archivist of the archiepiscopal palace; secretary to Cardinal János Simor; notary of the Holy See; titular abbot of Savnyik; archiepiscopal chancellor; pastor of the cathedral in 1893 and Royal chaplain to the House of Habsburg in 1887. He was also Deputy in the Parliament of Hungary, representing his native city in 1901. He was created Protonotary apostolic on 15 April 1907.

== Episcopate ==
Appointed Bishop of Csanád by Pope Pius X on 16 February 1908, he was promoted to the metropolitan see of Kalocsa on 20 April 1911. Around that time he was also a Royal counsellor. He was finally transferred to the metropolitan and primatial Archdiocese of Esztergom by Pope Pius on 13 December 1912.

== Cardinalate ==
Csernoch was created Cardinal-Priest of Sant'Eusebio in the consistory of 25 May 1914 by Pope Pius X. He received the red biretta from Archduke Franz Ferdinand of Austria (who was to be assassinated in Sarajevo on 28 June 1914). He was decorated with the Grand Cross of the Order of Saint Stephen in 1915. On 30 December 1916, as Primate of Hungary he crowned King Charles IV of Hungary, who was at the same time Charles I of Austria. He participated in the conclave of 1914, which elected Pope Benedict XV, and in that of 1922, which elected Pope Pius XI. He died in office in 1927.

Catholic Church titles
Preceded by Alexander Dessewffy	Bishop of Csanád; 16 February 1908 – 20 April 1911	Succeeded by Gyula Glattfelder
Preceded by Gyula Városy	Archbishop of Kalocsa; 20 April 1911 – 13 December 1912	Succeeded by Árpád Lipót Várady
Preceded by Kolos Ferenc Vaszary	Archbishop of Esztergom; 13 December 1912 – 25 July 1927	Succeeded by Jusztinián György Serédi
