= Roman Catholic Diocese of Oradea Mare =

Roman Catholic diocese in Romania

Coordinates: 47.0686°N 21.9321°E

Diocese of Oradea Mare Dioecesis Magnovaradinensis Latinorum Dieceza Romano-Catolică de Oradea Mare

Catholic
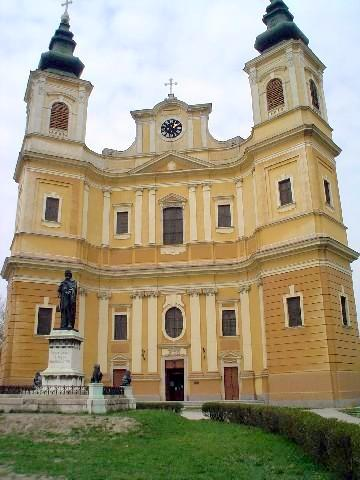
- Cathedral Basilica of St. Mary, Oradea

Location
- Country: Romania
- Ecclesiastical province: Bucharest
- Metropolitan: Roman Catholic Archdiocese of Bucharest

Statistics
- Area: 12,152 km^{2} (4,692 sq mi)
- Population: Total; Catholics: (as of 2013); 1,011,330; 106,020 (10.5%)

Information
- Denomination: Roman Catholic
- Sui iuris church: Latin Church
- Rite: Roman Rite
- Established: 1077 (As Diocese of Oradea Mare); 5 June 1930 (Diocese of Oradea Mare and Satu Mare); 28 June 1941 (Diocese of Oradea Mare); 9 April 1948 (Diocese of Oradea Mare and Satu Mare); 18 October 1982 (Diocese of Oradea Mare)
- Cathedral: The Cathedral Basilica of Oradea

Current leadership
- Pope: Leo XIV
- Bishop: László Böcskei
- Metropolitan Archbishop: Aurel Percă

Map
- Administrative map of the Roman Catholic Church in Romania

Website
- Website of the Diocese

The Diocese of Oradea (Latin: Dioecesis Magnovaradinensis Latinorum, Hungarian: Nagyváradi Római Katolikus Egyházmegye, Romanian: Dieceza Romano-Catolică de Oradea Mare) is a Latin Church ecclesiastical territory of the Catholic Church in Romania, named after its episcopal see in the city of Oradea.

== Description ==
It covers most of Crişana—the counties of Bihor and Arad, 10.5% of which are Catholic. Its adherents are predominantly Hungarian. It is suffragan to the Bucharest Archdiocese, like all Romanian bishoprics. Its bishop since 2008 is László Böcskei. Its present Cathedral of St. Mary also has the status of minor basilica.

== History ==
Oradea has been, under the names of Várad (Nagyvárad since 1872) (in Hungarian), Veľký Varadín (in Slovak) and Großwardein (in German), the see of several major denominational Christian church communities during its history.

A diocese in the former Kingdom of Hungary, the Diocese of Várad/Grosswardein was suffragan to the Archbishopric of Kalocsa-Bács. The foundation of the see around 1020 is ascribed by the historian György Pray to King Stephen I of Hungary; the seat of the diocese, however, was then Byhor (Bihar), whence it was transferred by King Ladislaus I of Hungary to Várad (Oradea) in 1077. The statutes of the chapter of 1370 explicitly attribute the founding of the see to King Ladislaus. The patron of the diocese is Ladislaus. Sixtus (1103–1113) is said to have been the first bishop.

In 1241, the bishopric and the city were devastated during the Mongol invasion of Europe. In the 14th and 15th centuries, the diocese developed considerably, and as early as the 14th century embraced six archidiaconates, with over 300 parishes. Bishop Andreas Báthori (1329–1345) rebuilt the cathedral in Gothic style. Jotram (1383–1395) erected the famous equestrian statue of King Ladislaus. From that epoch dates also the Hermes, now preserved at Győr, which contains the skull of King Ladislaus, and which is a masterpiece of the Hungarian goldsmith's art. Bishop János Vitéz (alias Johann Vitíz von Zredna, 1445–1465) was one of the most distinguished and active promoters of Humanism in Hungary. The political dissolution following the Battle of Mohács in 1526 and the spread of Protestantism caused the rapid decline of the diocese. After the death of György Martinuzzi (1535–1551), the greatest of the bishops of Várad and the advisor of King János Szapolyai and Queen Isabella, the see deteriorated.

Protestantism continually gained in extent, and even the establishment of the Jesuits at Großwardein/Várad in 1579 could not save the Catholic religion in the diocese. In 1606 the last Catholic priest left the city. The old cathedral fell into disrepair, and in 1618 the walls which still stood were torn down by Gabriel Bethlen. In 1660 it was conquered by the Ottoman Empire, which ruled until 1692. Upon their departure, the reorganization of the diocese was begun under Bishop (later Metropolitan of Kalocsa and Cardinal) Gosf Imre Csáky (1702–1732). The foundation stone of the present cathedral was laid in 1752 by Bishop Gosf Paul Forgách (1747–1757). From then onwards the condition of the Catholic religion improved.

In 1777 part of its territory was split off to form the diocese of Satu Mare, with which it was reunited in 1930, only to see it reconstituted in 1941 and again suppressed in 1948. The diocese was established within its present boundaries, drawn by Ceaușescu's Communist regime, on 18 October 1982, again without the reconstituted Satu Mare.

Several of its bishops later were transferred to Hungarian sees, and/or promoted to Metropolitan of Kalocsa and/or of Esztergom (also both in Hungary). Two (including one aforementioned archbishop) were created cardinals.

== List of bishops ==
- Coloman of Hungary 1083–1091
- Nicholas 1163–1181
- Vata 1186–1189
- Elvin 1189–1200
- Benedict Osl 1231–1243
- Vincent 1244–1258
- Zosimus 1259–1265
- Lodomer 1268–1279
- Thomas 1279–1282
- Bartholomew 1284–1285
- Emmeric I 1297–1317
- Demetrius Futaki, Bishop of Várad 1345
- Johannes VI. de Dominis 1440–1444, killed at the Battle of Varna
- Ivan Vitez 1445–1465 (before Archbishop of Esztergom)
- Johann Beckenschlager 1465-1468
- John Filipec 1476-1490
- George Szatmári 1501–1505
- Imre Czibak 1526–1534, murdered
- George Martinuzzi 1535–1551
- Ferenc Forgách 1556–1556
- János Telegdy 1613–1619
- Benedict Kisdy 1646–1468
- Imre Csáky 1702–1732
- Adam Patačić 1716–1784
- Arnold Ipolyi 1886-1886
- Lőrinc Schlauch 1887–1902 (cardinal from 1893)
- Áron Márton 1939–1942 (apostolic administrator)
- János Scheffler 1942–1952 (apostolic administrator), died in prison. Beatified in 2011.
- József Tempfli 1990–2008
- László Böcskei since 2008

== See also ==
- List of Roman Catholic dioceses in Romania
