= Kolos Ferenc Vaszary =

Hungarian cardinal

His Eminence Kolos Ferenc Vaszary O.S.B.
- Cardinal, Archbishop of Esztergom; Primate of Hungary
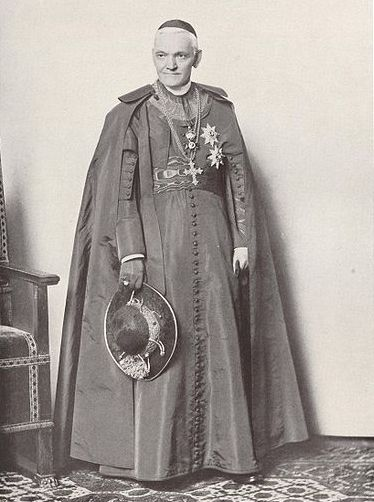
- Church: Roman Catholic
- Archdiocese: Esztergom
- Appointed: 17 December 1891
- In office: 1891–1912
- Predecessor: János Simor
- Successor: János Csernoch
- Other post: Cardinal-Priest of Santi Silvestro e Martino ai Monti

Orders
- Ordination: 26 May 1856
- Consecration: 7 February 1892 by Luigi Galimberti
- Created cardinal: 16 January 1893 by Leo XIII
- Rank: Cardinal-Priest

Personal details
- Born: February 12, 1832 Keszthely, Kingdom of Hungary, Austrian Empire
- Died: September 3, 1915 (aged 83) Balatonfüred, Austria-Hungary
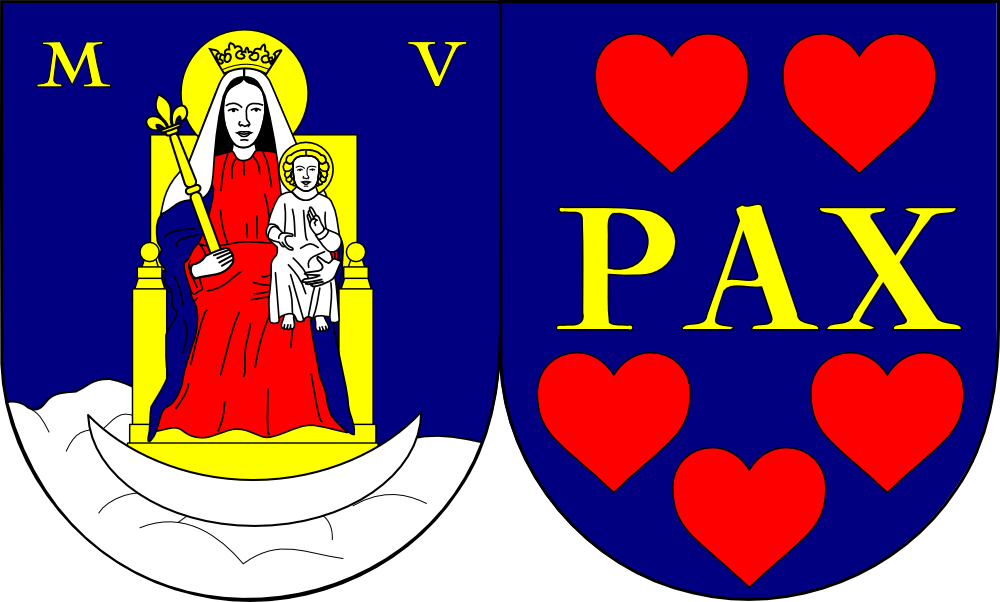
- Coat of arms

Kolos Ferenc Vaszary, O.S.B. (12 February 1832 in Keszthely, Hungary – 3 September 1915 in Balatonfüred, Hungary) was a cardinal of the Roman Catholic Church and a longtime archbishop of the prestigious see of Esztergom in the Austro-Hungarian Empire.

He entered the Order of Saint Benedict in 1847 and was professed on 6 June 1854. Two years later he was ordained to the priesthood on 26 May 1856 and for a long time worked as a school teacher. When almost 60 years old, he was appointed Archbishop of Esztergom and thus Prince-Primate of Hungary on 13 December 1891, and received episcopal ordination on 7 February 1892. The Archbishop of Esztergom (which contains the Hungarian capital of Budapest) is traditionally made a cardinal, Pope Leo XIII elevated Vaszary to the cardinalate less than a year later, on 16 January 1893. At the same time the Habsburg monarchy recognised his services to the community by giving him the order of Sankt Stefan.

Styles of Kolos Ferenc Vaszary
- Reference style: His Eminence
- Spoken style: Your Eminence
- Informal style: Cardinal
- See: Esztergom

Cardinal Vaszary served as an Archbishop for twenty years, participating in the conclave of 1903. At a time when bishops typically served as long as they lived, and today's practice of resigning at the age of 75 had not yet begun, Cardinal Vaszary's health declined so much that in November 1912 it was absolutely impossible for him to continue fulfilling any of the work of an archbishop, and he announced his resignation. Because of the then existing agreements between the Catholic Church and the Habsburg monarchy, both the Pope and the Emperor had to accept his resignation before it took effect. They accepted it in the first week of 1913.

Already eighty-two when Pope Pius X died, Cardinal Vaszary was quite unable to participate in the conclave which elected Pius X's successor, Pope Benedict XV.
