= Matthias Hermán =

Matthias from the kindred Hermán (Hungarian: Hermán nembeli Mátyás) was provost of Szepes chapter (today Spišská Kapitula in Spišské Podhradie, Slovakia) from 1234 to c. 1261.

== Life and career ==
Matthias was born into the Meszes branch of the gens (clan) Hermán as one of the four sons of Izsép. His brothers were Antaleus, Herbord and Andrew, while he also had a cousin Andronicus (mentioned as "frater" by Matthias in 1258). The Meszes branch had estates and lands in Zemplén County. Matthias was first mentioned in 1234, when he was elected provost of Szepes by the chapter, replacing Benedict. Formerly he served as canon at the Esztergom Basilica. In 1239, Béla IV sent him as one of the envoys to the Roman Curia in order to confirm the election of Matthias Rátót, Archbishop of Esztergom by Pope Gregory IX. During the Mongol invasion of Hungary, the four sons of Izsép actively participated in the skirmishes, one of them, Andrew was killed. Following that they received Olaszliszka from Béla IV of Hungary, but later the king donated the village to the provostry of Szepes.

Antaleus was styled himself lord of Meszes in 1255, he became the ancestor of the Meszesi (or Liszkai) noble family. Later he acquired lands in Szepes County. After the Mongol invasion, Matthias ordered to renovate the St. Martin's Cathedral, dedicated to Saint Martin of Tours. The towers of the cathedral were built during his term, which became an examples of Romanesque architecture in the Kingdom of Hungary. The first canons (lectors, cantors and custodes) at the Szepes chapter were appointed under Matthias' provostry.

== Sources ==
- Karácsonyi, János (1901). A magyar nemzetségek a XIV. század közepéig. II. kötet [The Hungarian genera until the middle of the 14th century, Vol. 2] (in Hungarian). Hungarian Academy of Sciences.
- Labanc, Peter (2011). Spišskí prepošti do roku 1405 [Scepusian provosts till 1405 (in Slovak). University of Trnava. ISBN 978-83-7490-440-7.

Matthias Genus Hermán Born: ? Died: after 1261
Catholic Church titles
Preceded by Adolph	Provost of Szepes; 1234–1261	Succeeded by Mutimir
