= Hermán (genus) =

Genus (gens) Hermán
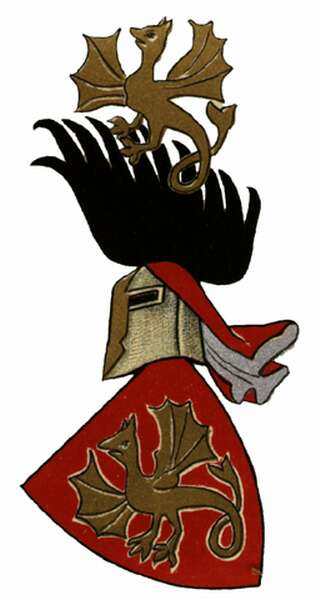
- Country: Kingdom of Hungary
- Founded: 996
- Founder: Herman
- Cadet branches: a, Senior branch: House of Hermáni (?); House of Hidvégi; House of Bakonyai; House of Palinai; b, Meszes branch: House of Meszesi; House of Szebenyei; c, Pestes branch: House of Lackfi; House of Makrai

Hermán (also Hermány, Herman or Hermann) was the name of a gens (Latin for "clan"; nemzetség in Hungarian) in the Kingdom of Hungary. The powerful Lackfi family ascended from this clan.

== Theories of origin ==
The Hermány kindred originate from Nuremberg. They are of quite high nobility and came to Hungary with Queen Gisela.

— Simon of Kéza: The Deeds of the Hungarians

This clan of Herman of Alamannia came with the Queen Keisla. They are free men from Nurumburg, poor in lands.

— Illuminated Chronicle

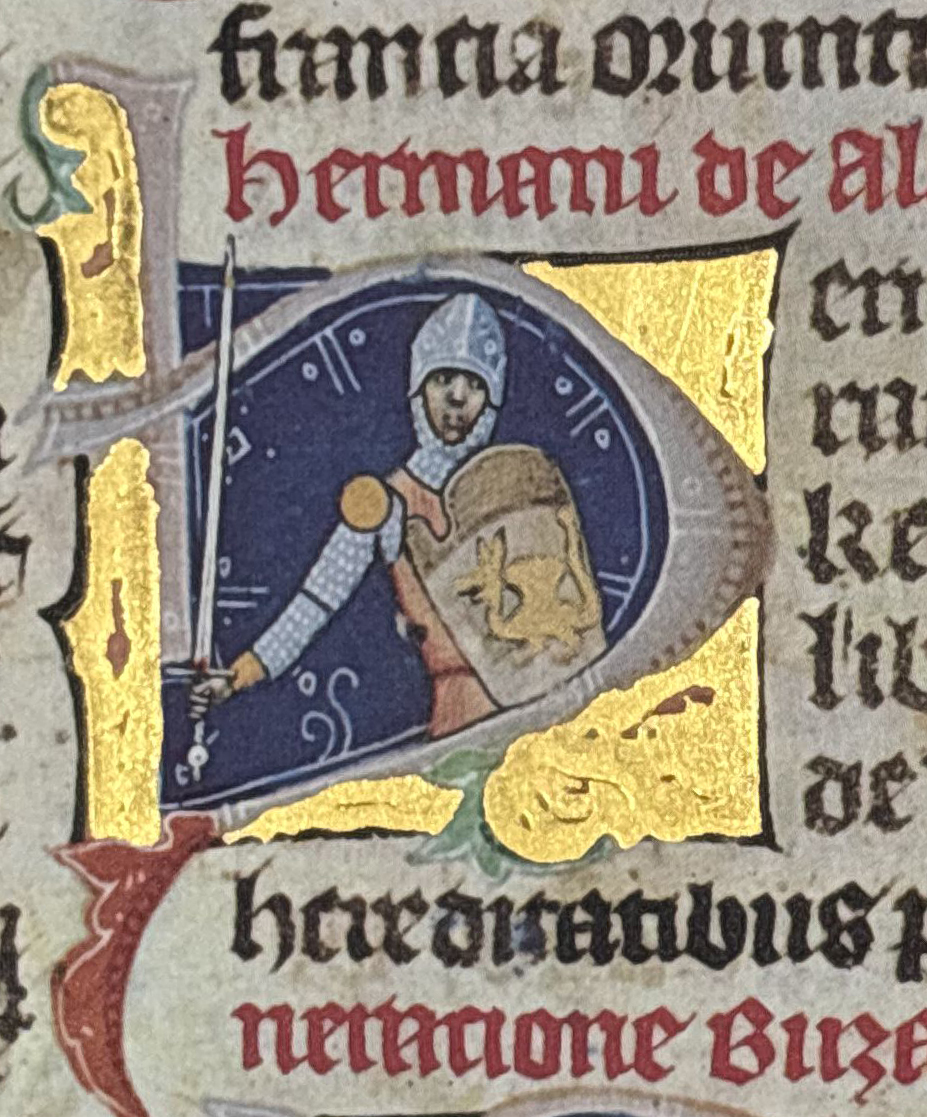
Knight Herman depicted in the Illuminated Chronicle

Medieval Hungarian chronicles preserved its origin from the Duchy of Bavaria. Accordingly, the ancestor of the Hermán kindred, knight Herman originated from Nuremberg, who escorted Gisela of Bavaria to Hungary in 996. She became the wife of Stephen I of Hungary, the future first King of Hungary. Following that marriage, Herman stayed in Hungary and received land donations in Vas County. It is presumable that Herman also participated in Stephen's civil war against his relative Koppány in the following year, similarly to other German knights, for instance Vecelin and brothers Hont and Pázmány, ancestors of the Hont-Pázmány kindred.

The narration of the medieval chronicles about the kindred's origin is unverifiable, but historian János Karácsonyi argued, the Hermáns definitely settled down in Hungary ahead of the Héder and Hahót clans, also of German origins, who came to the kingdom in the middle of the 12th century and their lands laid in the "gyepűelve", a mostly uninhabited or sparsely inhabited area beyond the Austrian border, while the Hermáns were granted estates in the inner parts of Transdanubia. Other historians considered, knight Herman was a descendant of the Diepoldinger kinship and its cadet branch, the House of Raabs which ruled the Burgraviate of Nuremberg in the 12th century, until their extinction around 1191, as both families used the depiction of dragon in their coat-of-arms.

Contrary to other descriptions, both the Gesta Hunnorum et Hungarorum and the Illuminated Chronicle (which utilized magister Ákos' work) remained short-spoken while presented the history of the Hermán clan. As chronicler Simon of Kéza was contemporary to Rubinus Hermán, an illustrious soldier and faithful subject to the royal court of Ladislaus IV of Hungary, and, in addition, the powerful Lacki family reached its peak by the Illuminated Chronicle was compiled, this phenomenon is not malicious and intentional. According to historian Attila Zsoldos, the terms "quite high nobility", "free men" and "poor in lands" prove that the Hermáns originally belonged to the social status of royal servants who owned possession and was subordinate only to the king. By the end of the 13th century, the use of the expression ceased, and the "royal servants" merged into the nobility of the kingdom, including the Hermán clan. Zsoldos referred to a royal charter, which mentioned a Swabian "free man" Kaal, who also escorted Gisela to Hungary in 996 and settled down in Sopron County. His descendants were members of the group of castle warriors.

== In contemporary documents ==
The first members of the clan appeared in contemporary documents since the early 13th century. Due to incomplete data, there are only fragmented genealogical tables. János Karácsonyi described three branches of the clan: the senior branch from Vas County; the Meszes branch which had holdings in Zemplén and later Szepes County; and the Lackfi branch which resided in Tiszántúl and Transylvania (they possessed lands mostly in Arad and Csanád Counties), and the Lackfi family ascended from there. In the 1990s, historian Pál Engel used different denominations and subdivisions. Accordingly, the Lackfi and the Felpestesi (and its two branches, the Szentgyörgyi de Felpestes and the Makrai de Felpestes) families descended from a same line, the Pestes branch. Engel described two other kinships, the Meszes and Bakonya (or Palina) branches, while claimed the Hermáni family also belonged to the Hermán kindred (in contrast, Karácsonyi argued the eponymous family seat, Hermány, near Szombathely was lost to female line soon).

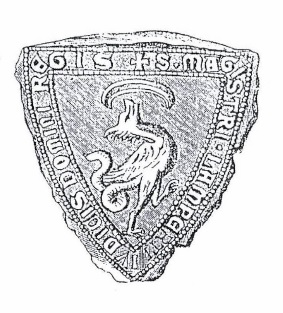
Seal of Lampert Hermán (1314)

Throughout the 13th century, several clan members were mentioned as ad litem judges and pristaldi (bailiffs) in several cases of lawsuits. The first known member of the clan, Dietrich bought a land between Vép and Bőd (today Nemesbőd), near Hermány, in 1226. His ancestors and possible descendants are not known. A certain Bartholomew functioned as pristaldus in Zala County in 1233. Three members acted as oath companions and witnesses in 1238, when were referred to as "good men" and "nobles". Béla IV of Hungary appointed one of them, Tyma as pristaldus to execute the king's land reform in Vas County, who revised his predecessors' land grants and reclaimed former royal estates (while Tyma also lost Körmend due to the monarch's policy). In 1240, Achilles and Dés were delegated to the court during a lawsuit, installed by the chapter of Vasvár. In 1255, comes Dés was granted a land of "three plows" in Körmend to finish its tower, part of the fortified western border system. In 1263, Henry and Herbord, sons of Herteveg also acted as ad litem judges, in addition to Herman. Herman's brother was comes Pousa, the most illustrious member of the senior branch during that time, who served as a judge in the court of Queen Maria Laskarina in 1265.

The first known member of the Meszes branch was Izsép who received lands and estates in Zemplén County for some reason by the 1230s. His four sons actively participated in the skirmishes during the Mongol invasion of Hungary, one of them Andrew was killed. Following that they received Olaszliszka from Béla IV, but later the king donated the village to the provostry of Szepes. One of his sons Matthias was elected provost of Szepes. During his provostry, he ordered to renovate the St. Martin's Cathedral, dedicated to Saint Martin of Tours. The towers of the cathedral were built during his term, which became an examples of Romanesque architecture in the Kingdom of Hungary. Today's Spišská Kapitula (in Slovakia) became one of the most influential seats of the church administration. Antaleus was styled himself lord of Meszes in 1255, he became the ancestor of the Meszesi (or Liszkai) noble family. Later he acquired lands in Szepes County. His grandsons, Desiderius and Michael tried to regain Olaszliszka unsuccessfully from the provostry of Szepes in 1326. Desiderius was last mentioned in 1336, it seems that he was last member of the Meszes branch. It is possible that Demetrius Meszesi, who functioned as cantor at the Óbuda Chapter from 1332 to 1343 (not to be confused with Bishop Demetrius Futaki), belonged to this family. The Szebenyei family descended from Izsép's other son Herbord.

Paradoxically, the kinship relations of the three most notable members of the kindred – Rubinus, Lampert and Lack – is unknown. Rubinus, who served the kings of Hungary as a "brave" and "loyal" soldier since the 1260s, was a son of a certain Herman, and had two brothers, Feldricus and Charles. His activity and land properties confirmed, he belonged to the kindred's ancient Vas County branch. As he is the only known member of his kindred, the Hermáns, who operated in Transylvania, it is conceivable that he was an ancestor of 14th-century members, either Lampert (his parents are unidentified) and/or Lack (son of a certain Denis), the forefather of the Lackfis. The latter two's lands were located close to each other and both became part of Charles I of Hungary' inner circle suddenly, who permanently resided in the eastern parts of the kingdom after 1315.

== Sources ==
=== Primary sources ===
- Simon of Kéza: The Deeds of the Hungarians (Edited and translated by László Veszprémy and Frank Schaer with a study by Jenő Szűcs) (1999). CEU Press. ISBN 963-9116-31-9.
- The Hungarian Illuminated Chronicle: Chronica de Gestis Hungarorum (Edited by Dezső Dercsényi) (1970). Corvina, Taplinger Publishing. ISBN 0-8008-4015-1.

=== Secondary sources ===
- Bényei, Balázs (2011). "Hermán nembeli Lampert országbíró tisztségbe jutásának körülményei [The Circumstances of the Appointment of Lampert of the kindred Hermán to the Office of Judge Royal]". In Mihalik, Béla Vilmos; Zarnóczki, Áron (eds.). Tanulmányok Badacsonyból. A Fiatal Levéltárosok Egyesületének konferenciája, Badacsony, 2010. július 9–10 (in Hungarian). Fiatal Levéltárosok Egyesülete. pp. 11–23. ISBN 978-963-08-3098-0.
- Engel, Pál (1996). Magyarország világi archontológiája, 1301–1457, I. [Secular Archontology of Hungary, 1301–1457, Volume I] (in Hungarian). História, MTA Történettudományi Intézete. ISBN 963-8312-44-0.
- Karácsonyi, János (1901). A magyar nemzetségek a XIV. század közepéig. II. kötet [The Hungarian genera until the middle of the 14th century, Vol. 2] (in Hungarian). Hungarian Academy of Sciences.
- Markó, László (2006). A magyar állam főméltóságai Szent Istvántól napjainkig: Életrajzi Lexikon [Great Officers of State in Hungary from King Saint Stephen to Our Days: A Biographical Encyclopedia] (in Hungarian). Helikon Kiadó. ISBN 963-208-970-7.
- Zsoldos, Attila (1998). "Királyi szerviensek és nemzetsége(i)k [Servientes regis and the/ir/ "clans"]". In Novák, László (ed.). Az Alföld társadalma (in Hungarian). Pest Megyei Múzeumok Igazgatósága. pp. 149–171. ISBN 963-7134-23-9.
- Zsoldos, Attila (2011). Magyarország világi archontológiája, 1000–1301 [Secular Archontology of Hungary, 1000–1301] (in Hungarian). História, MTA Történettudományi Intézete. ISBN 978-963-9627-38-3.
