= Lampert Hermán =

Hungarian nobleman (died 1324)

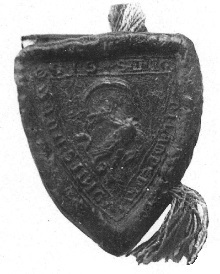
- Seal of Lampert Hermán, 1322

Judge royal
- Reign: 1314–1324
- Predecessor: John Csák
- Successor: Alexander Köcski
- Died: 4–5 July 1324 near Küküllő River (?), Transylvania, Kingdom of Hungary
- Noble family: gens Hermán
- Father: Emeric

Lampert from the kindred Hermán (Hungarian: Hermán nembeli Lampert; died 4–5 July 1324) was an influential Hungarian nobleman who served as Judge royal from 1314 until his death. He belonged to Charles I of Hungary's "new aristocracy", who supported the king's efforts to restore royal power in the first decades of the 14th century.

During the 10 years of his period in office, Lampert stabilised the royal judicial system and the more the armed unification of the kingdom expanded the local space of royal authority, the more the territorial jurisdiction of Lampert expanded. His tenure as Judge royal marked the gradual stabilization of the operation of the judicial institution.

== Family ==
Lampert was born into the gens (clan) Hermán. His parents are unidentified, as a result there is an inability to connect his person to the three known branches of the clan. Perhaps his grandfather or other kind of direct relative was Rubinus, a successful soldier of Ladislaus IV of Hungary, who also elevated to the position of Judge royal in the 1280s. A royal document from 1323 referred to Lampert as son of Emeric, whose identity is uncertain. Lampert had a sister, who married a certain Thomas, son of Ihon. According to Simon Kézai's Gesta Hunnorum et Hungarorum, the ancestor of the Hermán kindred, knight Herman originated from Nuremberg, who escorted Gisela of Bavaria to Hungary in 996. She married Stephen I of Hungary, the future first King of Hungary. Following that Herman received land donations in Vas County. Both Simon of Kéza and the 14th-century Illuminated Chronicle described the Hermán kindred as "relatively poor". Lampert was exclusively styled as "magister" in the contemporary documents, even when he held various ispánates ("comes") beside his dignity of Judge royal. This maybe reflects his lowborn origin, in comparison to the other barons of the royal court.

His inherency to the Hermán kindred was proved by his seal which appeared in a document dated on 29 September 1313. His seal was first published by historian Imre Nagy in 1878. Previously Vilmos Fraknói claimed Lampert was a member of the Hont-Pázmány clan. Albert Nyári called him "Leszenyei", while Mór Wertner connected his person to the Csanád kindred, based on his last will and testament, where the historian identified his land property with locations in Krassó County, where the Csanáds owned the majority of the land. Historian János Karácsonyi recognized the dragon depiction in Lampert's seal and proved his origin. His degree of kinship to contemporary relative Lack Hermán, ancestor of the Lackfi family, is unknown, but their lands were located close to each other. Lampert's lands laid in Temes County, belonging to the local nobility surrounding the provisional royal centre Temesvár (present-day Timișoara, Romania), as historian Ildikó Tóth considered. However, it is also possible he acquired his possessions there only after Charles decided to move his seat to Temesvár, and had not interests in the region prior to that. According to a document issued in 1319, he bought Széphely (present-day Jebel, Romania) and Sajtos from Theodore Vejtehi sometimes earlier, and the king donated three other surrounding villages to Lampert, compensating the former oligarch Vejtehi with lands in Csanád County.

== Judge royal ==
As he first appeared in contemporary records in a royal charter, issued on 29 September 1313, according to its date, when he was already Judge royal, Lampert's early life and career advancement cannot be reconstructed. Similarly to his relative Lack, he became part of King Charles' inner circle suddenly. In that charter the King ordered Lampert to move to Buda. Beside that he was also referred to as ispán of Csanád County. He was next mentioned by a diploma from 8 July 1315, when he resided in Lippa (today Lipova, Romania).

Since his predecessor John Csák, who later betrayed the King and joined his distant relative, oligarch Matthew Csák, was still referred to as Judge royal in mid-1314, a scholarly debate emerged on the relevance of the above-mentioned (1313) charter. Historian Pál Engel declared the year of release is invalid and fixed it to 29 September 1314. Engel considered Lampert's appointment was part of a large-scale replacement of the elite, when Charles decided to struggle the oligarchs' power (Palatine James Borsa was also dismissed during that time) and appointed his supporters to the dignities. In contrast, Iván Bertényi, Sr. argued John Csák and Lampert Hermán simultaneously held the dignity for a time until 1315, similarly to that case, where many oligarchs were styled themselves palatines during the era of feudal anarchy. Balázs Bényei argued Lampert became Judge royal only in the summer of 1315, after John Csák's betrayal. Voivode Nicholas Pok and Palatine Dominic Rátót were also appointed to their dignities at the royal court in the same period, replacing the late Ladislaus Kán and James Borsa, respectively. He argued Lampert was also appointed as ispán of Csanád County, when the Kán clan gradually lost its influence in Transylvania since the death of their paterfamilias in early 1315. As his lands and estates laid mostly in Tiszántúl near the border with Transylvania, it is presumable that Lampert actively participated in the royal campaigns against the Kán and Ákos sons to help to restore the royal power.

Charles transferred his residence from Buda to Temesvár in early 1315. Lampert also resided here for most his term as Judge royal. His whole reign coincided with Charles' war against the oligarchs, when the king restored royal power primarily with the assistance of the prelates and lesser noblemen in most regions of the kingdom. Under such conditions, when the king extended his influence gradually over the dominions one after another, Lampert had initially limited powers, practically served as judge of the royal household, instead of the whole kingdom. He issued 161 charters during his decade-long term, most of them since 1319, the second period of his activity. Altogether a collection of 275 documents covers his activity. Initially, the authority of the institution was limited; most of his early charters contain absence or disobedience of litigants, lot of deferrals and the poor execution of the denials, which definitely reflect the faltering of judicial system, which operated with low efficiency under the conditions of the constant war situation. Lampert's jurisdiction further narrowed at the turn of 1316 and 1317, when Charles I launched a multi-front war against the oligarchs. After the second half of 1317, the number of his charters had rapidly increased, and his territorial involvement was expanding too. In parallel with Charles' successful unification war, Lampert's jurisdiction extended to Transylvania and Délvidék, in addition to central Hungary.

On Lampert's instruction, the chapters of Várad (today Oradea, Romania) and Eger functioned as the most important places of authentication for his tribunal seat. There is limited information about the composition of his staff. His deputy, vice-judge royal Peter Szentemágocs was mentioned twice in 1319, and as "vicecomes" 1323, when sold an estate with his relative John Alsáni. His notary was a certain magister Nicholas in 1322. In the same year, an unidentified magister "Wz" was referred to as "the judge royal's man" when he took part in a confiscation process of land. Several court bailiffs also appeared in contemporary records. Based on the documents, Lampert performed extensive and versatile judicial activities, proving the existence of first reform steps within the dignity of Judge royal, which will be fulfilled under his successors, Alexander Köcski and Paul Nagymartoni. Among others, Lampert summoned witnesses, issued iudicialis, imposed payment of fines, registered new landowners to their newly acquired estates, confirmed royal charters in the name of the king, and sentenced in land property and criminal cases. Some sources suggest, Lampert was occasionally involved in abuses of office, similarly to his contemporary office-holders. His wealth increased rapidly during his term as Judge royal. In 1349, the nobles of Kalonda (today part of Corund, Romania) complained in the generalis congregatio in Temes County, summoned by Palatine Nicholas Zsámboki, that their lands once were unlawfully occupied and confiscated by Lampert Hermán. During a lawsuit, he apportioned the two-thirds of Gyöngyös, Bene and Zsadány to himself, while Palatine Dózsa Debreceni received one-third in 1322.

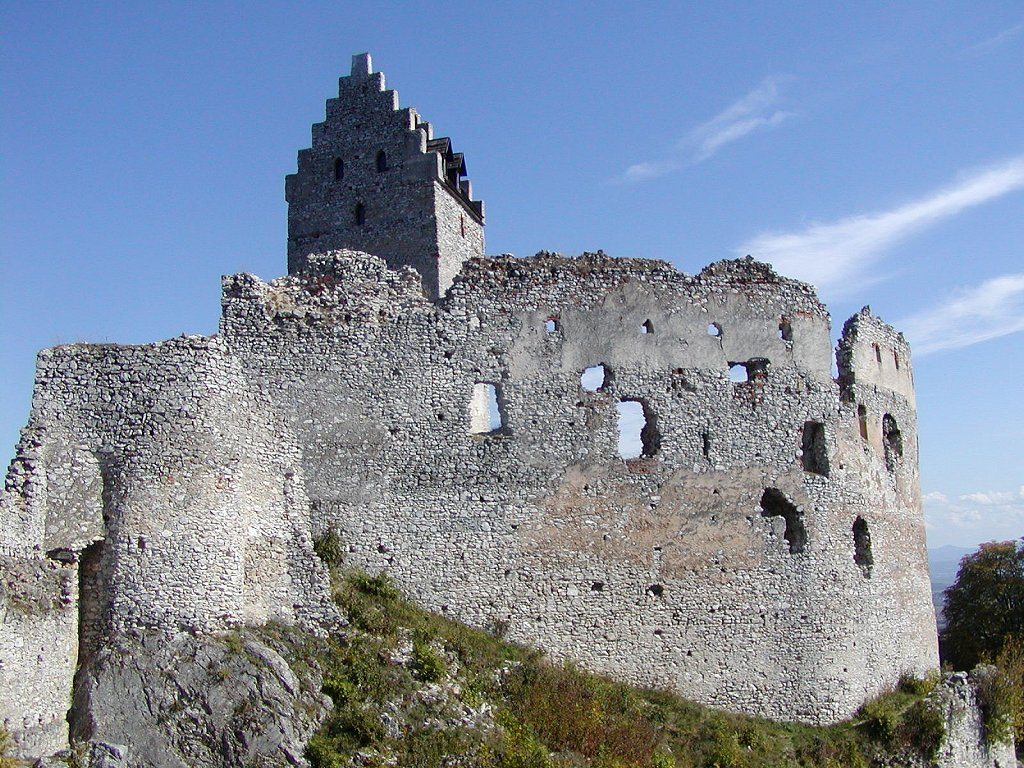
Topoľčany (Tapolcsány) Castle, today in Slovakia

Following the death of Matthew Csák in March 1321, the royal army invaded the deceased lord's province, which soon disintegrated because most of his former castellans yielded without resistance. After its capture, Lampert was made castellan of Tapolcsány Castle (today in Topoľčany, Slovakia), which became a royal fortress. In documents, he was first mentioned in that capacity on 8 January 1322. Beside that, he also served as ispán of Nyitra County (previously it belonged to the Csák dominion) too, holding both offices until his death. In 1323, Charles also appointed his judge royal as ispán of Zala County, after he had a prominent role in the capture of the Kőszegis' six fortresses in a series of royal campaigns. After defeating the last oligarchs, as one of his charters concluded, Charles had taken "full possession" of his kingdom by 1323. In the first half of the year, he moved his capital from Temesvár to Visegrád in the centre of his realm. Following that Lampert issued his last charters in Budafelhévíz (today a borough in the 2nd district of Budapest) where his court seat was established. Even after he retained the Várad and Eger chapters as places of authentication for his judgments and decisions.

Lampert escorted Charles in several royal military campaigns since the 1310s. For instance, he was present at the siege of Komárom (now Komárno in Slovakia) in October 1317. During the expedition against Stefan Uroš II Milutin, he issued his diplomas in Pétervárad and Szávaszentdemeter (today Petrovaradin and Sremska Mitrovica in Serbia, respectively). When Charles also attempted to reinstate royal authority in Croatia and Slavonia in 1322–23, Lampert was among the barons who were present in the royal army. He then issued his decrees in Zagreb and Križevci. As the Kán sons still meant a serious threat to the royal power through their continuous looting and raids, enjoying support from Basarab I of Wallachia, Charles launched a campaign to Transylvania in the summer of 1324. Lampert was last mentioned as a living person by Charles' four privilege charters from 5 and 6 July. A document of 1327, issued by Köcski mentioned that his predecessor died in Transylvania. On 8 July, a lawsuit has been postponed due to his death in Budafelhévíz. On 10 July, stationing near the river of Küküllő (Târnava), Charles mentioned that his Judge royal made his last will and testament in his deathbed, while suspended and annulled fines for his spiritual salvation. Historian Ferenc Piti argued, despite his appearance as a living person on 6 July, it was impossible for the information on his death to pass by 8 July from Transylvania to Budafelhévíz under medieval transport conditions, thefore the charters from 5 and 6 July were plausibly dated afterwards. His dignity remained vacant no later than 3 October, when Köcski was first referred to as Judge royal. Lampert Hermán had no descendants from his unidentified wife.

== Sources ==
- Almási, Tibor (2017). "Hermán nembéli Lampert királyi országbíró működésének okleveles adatai [Certified Data on the Deeds of Lampert from the Kindred Hermán, Royal Judge]". Forum Acta Juridica et Politica. 7 (1). University of Szeged: 5–29. ISSN 2063-2525.
- Bényei, Balázs (2011). "Hermán nembeli Lampert országbíró tisztségbe jutásának körülményei [The Circumstances of the Appointment of Lampert of the kindred Hermán to the Office of Judge Royal]". In Mihalik, Béla Vilmos; Zarnóczki, Áron (eds.). Tanulmányok Badacsonyból. A Fiatal Levéltárosok Egyesületének konferenciája, Badacsony, 2010. július 9–10 (in Hungarian). Fiatal Levéltárosok Egyesülete. pp. 11–23. ISBN 978-963-08-3098-0.
- Bertényi, Iván (1976). Az országbírói intézmény története a XIV. században [History of the Institution of Judge Royal in the 14th Century] (in Hungarian). Hungarian Academy of Sciences. ISBN 963-05-0734-X.
- Engel, Pál (1996). Magyarország világi archontológiája, 1301–1457, I. [Secular Archontology of Hungary, 1301–1457, Volume I] (in Hungarian). História, MTA Történettudományi Intézete. ISBN 963-8312-44-0.
- Markó, László (2006). A magyar állam főméltóságai Szent Istvántól napjainkig: Életrajzi Lexikon [Great Officers of State in Hungary from King Saint Stephen to Our Days: A Biographical Encyclopedia] (in Hungarian). Helikon Kiadó. ISBN 963-547-085-1.
- Piti, Ferenc (1997). "Okleveles adatok az 1324. évi országbíróváltáshoz [Chartered Data on the 1324 Replacement in the Position of Judge Royal]". Fons. 4 (2). Szentpétery Imre Történettudományi Alapítvány: 243–250. ISSN 1217-8020.
- Tóth, Ildikó (2003). "Adalékok Hermány nembeli Lampert országbírói működéséhez [Data to the Function of Lampert of the Hermány kindred as Judge Royal]". In Weisz, Boglárka (ed.). Középkortörténti tanulmányok. A III. Medievisztikai PhD-konferencia (Szeged, 2003. május 8–9.) előadásai (in Hungarian). University of Szeged. pp. 181–192. ISBN 978-963-482-664-4.

Lampert Genus Hermán Born: ? Died: 4–5 July 1324
Political offices
Preceded by John Csák	Judge royal 1314–1324	Succeeded by Alexander Köcski
