= Cumpurdinus =

Judge royal
- Reign: 1174–1181
- Predecessor: Lawrence
- Successor: Peter
- Died: after 1203
- Father: Rudolf

Cumpurdinus, son of Rudolf (Hungarian: Rudolf fia Cumpurdinus; died after 1203) was a nobleman in the Kingdom of Hungary, who served as Judge royal (Latin: curialis comes) between 1174 and 1181, during the reign of Béla III of Hungary.

He was last mentioned by a royal charter in 1203, when Emeric, King of Hungary instructed him to measure the borders of Merenye estate which then belonged to the Diocese of Veszprém.

== Sources ==
- (in Hungarian) Kristó, Gyula; Makk, Ferenc (1981). III. Béla emlékezete [Remembering Béla III]. Magyar Helikon.
- (in Hungarian) Markó, László: A magyar állam főméltóságai Szent Istvántól napjainkig – Életrajzi Lexikon (The High Officers of the Hungarian State from Saint Stephen to the Present Days – A Biographical Encyclopedia) (2nd edition); Helikon Kiadó Kft., 2006, Budapest; ISBN 963-547-085-1.
- (in Hungarian) Zsoldos, Attila (2011). Magyarország világi archontológiája, 1000–1301 ("Secular Archontology of Hungary, 1000–1301"). História, MTA Történettudományi Intézete. Budapest. ISBN 978-963-9627-38-3

Political offices
Preceded by Lawrence	Judge royal 1174–1181	Succeeded by Peter
