= Julius (judge royal) =

Judge royal
- Reign: before 1135
- Predecessor: George
- Successor: Bucan (?)

Julius (Hungarian: Gyula or Iula) was a nobleman in the Kingdom of Hungary, who served as Judge royal (Latin: comes [...] curialis regis) sometime before 1135, according to a royal charter, during the reign of Stephen II or Béla II.

== Sources ==
- (in Hungarian) Markó, László: A magyar állam főméltóságai Szent Istvántól napjainkig – Életrajzi Lexikon (The High Officers of the Hungarian State from Saint Stephen to the Present Days – A Biographical Encyclopedia) (2nd edition); Helikon Kiadó Kft., 2006, Budapest; ISBN 963-547-085-1.
- (in Hungarian) Zsoldos, Attila (2011). Magyarország világi archontológiája, 1000–1301 ("Secular Archontology of Hungary, 1000–1301"). História, MTA Történettudományi Intézete. Budapest. ISBN 978-963-9627-38-3

Political offices
Preceded by George	Judge royal before 1135	Succeeded by Bucan (?)
