= Peter (judge royal) =

Judge royal
- Reign: 1183
- Predecessor: Cumpurdinus
- Successor: Charena

Peter (Hungarian: Péter) was a nobleman in the Kingdom of Hungary, who served as Judge royal (Latin: curialis comes) in 1183, during the reign of Béla III of Hungary. According to a non-authentic charter, he already once held the position in 1171.

== Sources ==
- (in Hungarian) Markó, László: A magyar állam főméltóságai Szent Istvántól napjainkig – Életrajzi Lexikon (The High Officers of the Hungarian State from Saint Stephen to the Present Days – A Biographical Encyclopedia) (2nd edition); Helikon Kiadó Kft., 2006, Budapest; ISBN 963-547-085-1.
- (in Hungarian) Zsoldos, Attila (2011). Magyarország világi archontológiája, 1000–1301 ("Secular Archontology of Hungary, 1000–1301"). História, MTA Történettudományi Intézete. Budapest. ISBN 978-963-9627-38-3

Political offices
Preceded by Cumpurdinus	Judge royal 1183	Succeeded by Charena
