= Charena =

Judge royal
- Reign: 1184
- Predecessor: Peter
- Successor: Mog

Charena was a nobleman in the Kingdom of Hungary, who served as Judge royal (Latin: curialis comes) in 1184, during the reign of Béla III of Hungary.

He was appointed to the office sometime in 1183 or 1184. In this capacity, Béla III delegated him into the judicial body, of which Denis, Palatine of Hungary and comes Achilles were also members, which judged over the lawsuit between Tihany Abbey and the royal udvornici of Esztergom, according to a document issued by the collegiate chapter of Székesfehérvár. Charena was replaced by Mog as judge royal in 1185 at the latest.

== Sources ==
- Szőcs, Tibor (2014). A nádori intézmény korai története, 1000–1342 [An Early History of the Palatinal Institution: 1000–1342] (in Hungarian). Magyar Tudományos Akadémia Támogatott Kutatások Irodája. ISBN 978-963-508-697-9.
- Zsoldos, Attila (2011). Magyarország világi archontológiája, 1000–1301 [Secular Archontology of Hungary, 1000–1301] (in Hungarian). História, MTA Történettudományi Intézete. ISBN 978-963-9627-38-3.

Political offices
Preceded by Peter	Judge royal 1184	Succeeded by Mog
