= Gabriel (judge royal) =

Judge royal
- Reign: 1162–1164
- Predecessor: Appa (?)
- Successor: Lawrence
- Died: after 1164

Gabriel (Hungarian: Gábor; died after 1164) was a nobleman in the Kingdom of Hungary, who served as Judge royal (Latin: curialis comes) between 1162 and 1164, during the reign of Stephen III of Hungary.

He participated in the Battle of the Fischa in September 1146. During the skirmish, he captured a certain German lord Accio (or Otto). In 1148, he held the position of Master of the stewards (Latin: dapiferum [sic] magister) thus he was the first noble who undoubtedly bore the office according to an authentic charter. Gabriel was mentioned as ispán (comes) among the great barons in 1157. When the civil war broke out between Stephen III and his uncles (Ladislaus and Stephen IV) in 1162, he supported the young king. In 1163, Anti-king Stephen IV of Hungary appointed a rival Judge royal Brocca who contested Gabriel's legitimacy.

Following the wars and intervention of the Byzantine Empire, in order to compromise the peace treaty, Gabriel also agreed to send Duke Béla, younger brother of Stephen III, to Constantinople and his betrothal to Maria Komnene, and also to allow the Byzantines to take possession of Béla's duchy.

== Sources ==
- Makk, Ferenc (1989). The Árpáds and the Comneni: Political Relations between Hungary and Byzantium in the 12th century (Translated by György Novák). Akadémiai Kiadó. ISBN 963-05-5268-X.
- (in Hungarian) Markó, László: A magyar állam főméltóságai Szent Istvántól napjainkig – Életrajzi Lexikon (The High Officers of the Hungarian State from Saint Stephen to the Present Days – A Biographical Encyclopedia) (2nd edition); Helikon Kiadó Kft., 2006, Budapest; ISBN 963-547-085-1.
- (in Hungarian) Zsoldos, Attila (2011). Magyarország világi archontológiája, 1000–1301 ("Secular Archontology of Hungary, 1000–1301"). História, MTA Történettudományi Intézete. Budapest. ISBN 978-963-9627-38-3

Political offices
Preceded by Leuca (?)	Master of the stewards 1148	Succeeded by Simon Kacsics eventually
Preceded by Appa (?)	Judge royal 1162–1164	Succeeded by Lawrence
