= Brocca =

Hungarian nobleman

Judge royal
- Reign: 1163
- Predecessor: Gabriel
- Successor: Gabriel
- Noble family: gens Baracska

Brocca (Hungarian: Baracska) was a nobleman from Transdanubia in the Kingdom of Hungary, who was appointed Judge royal (Latin: curialis comes) by Anti-king Stephen IV of Hungary in 1163. He lost his office when his king suffered a decisive defeat at Székesfehérvár on 19 June 1163 against Stephen III of Hungary.

Brocca was a prominent member of the Baracska clan which originated from Bojta, a Cuman military commander and lord, however the name itself derived from Brocca. Thus the name of village Baracska is also named after Brocca, according to historian János Karácsonyi.

== Sources ==
- Makk, Ferenc (1989). The Árpáds and the Comneni: Political Relations between Hungary and Byzantium in the 12th century (Translated by György Novák). Akadémiai Kiadó. ISBN 963-05-5268-X.
- (in Hungarian) Zsoldos, Attila (2011). Magyarország világi archontológiája, 1000–1301 ("Secular Archontology of Hungary, 1000–1301"). História, MTA Történettudományi Intézete. Budapest. ISBN 978-963-9627-38-3

Political offices
Preceded by Gabriel	Judge royal contested by Gabriel; 1163	Succeeded by Gabriel
