= Benedict, son of Samud =

Hungarian noble

Judge royal
- Reign: 1231–1232
- Predecessor: Ladislaus Kán
- Successor: Demetrius Csák
- Died: after 1233
- Father: Samud

Benedict, son of Samud (Hungarian: Samud fia Benedek; died after 1233) was a Hungarian noble, who served as Judge royal between 1231 and 1232, during the reign of Andrew II of Hungary.

Based on his father's first name, it is possible that Benedict belonged to the Tomaj clan of Pecheneg origin. He was first mentioned as ispán of Szolnok County in 1217. Two years later, in 1219, he was appointed head of Nyitra County. He governed Újvár County in 1220. Following his replacement from the position of Judge royal, he was present among the king's companion in the forests of Bereg on 20 August 1233, where Andrew II vowed that he would not employ Jews and Muslims to administrate royal revenues, and would pay 10,000 marks as compensation for usurped Church revenues.

== Sources ==
- Markó, László (2006). A magyar állam főméltóságai Szent Istvántól napjainkig: Életrajzi Lexikon [Great Officers of State in Hungary from King Saint Stephen to Our Days: A Biographical Encyclopedia] (in Hungarian). Helikon Kiadó. ISBN 963-208-970-7.
- Zsoldos, Attila (2011). Magyarország világi archontológiája, 1000–1301 [Secular Archontology of Hungary, 1000–1301] (in Hungarian). História, MTA Történettudományi Intézete. ISBN 978-963-9627-38-3.

Political offices
Preceded by Ladislaus Kán	Judge royal 1231–1232	Succeeded by Demetrius Csák
