= Vyškovce nad Ipľom =

Vyškovce nad Ipľom Ipolyvisk
- Municipality
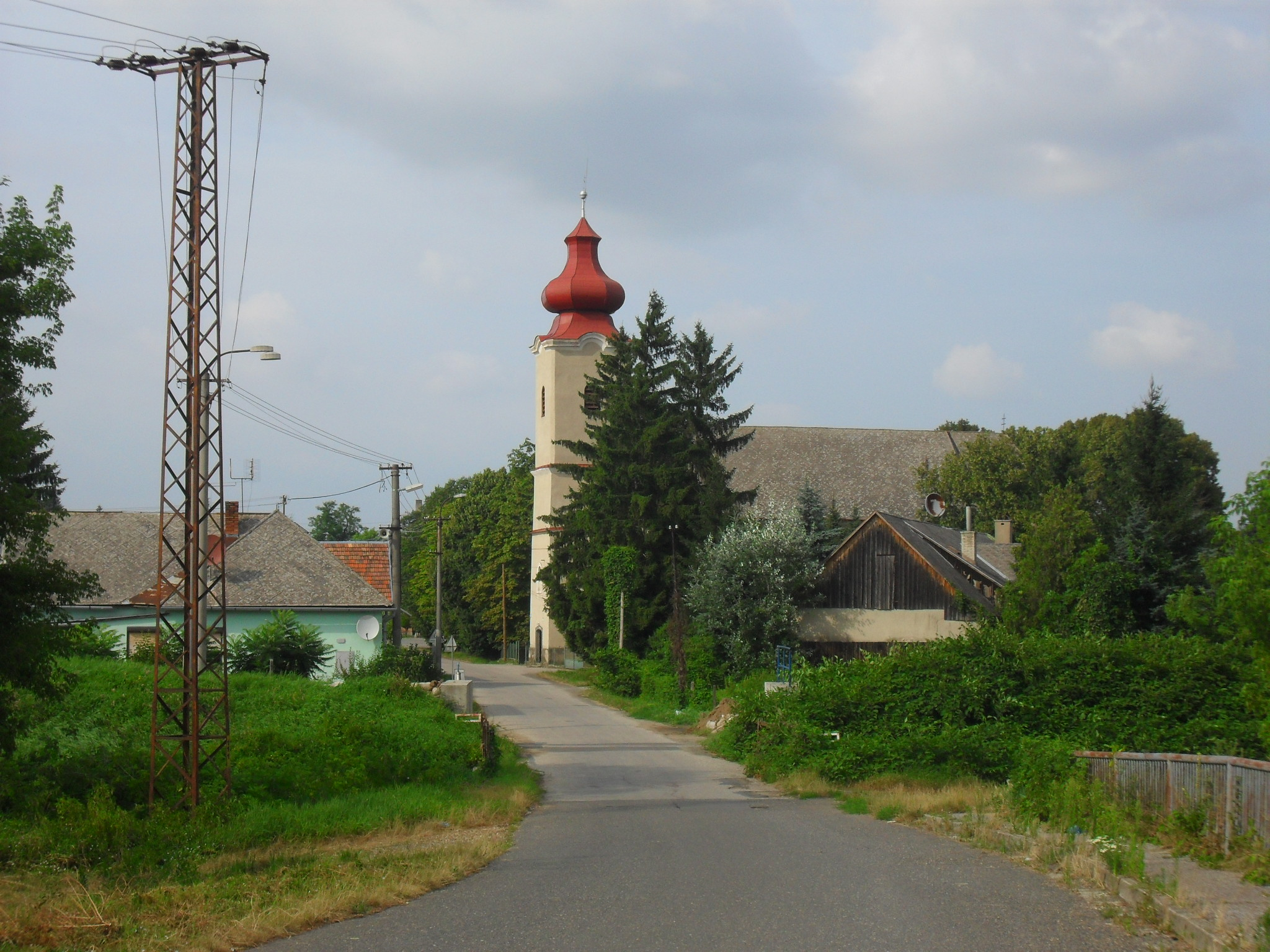

- Flag

- Location of Vyškovce nad Ipľom in the Nitra Region Location of Vyškovce nad Ipľom in Slovakia
- Coordinates: 48.05°N 18.87°E
- Country: Slovakia
- Region: Nitra Region
- District: Levice District
- First mentioned: 1256

Area
  - Total: 19.29 km^{2} (7.45 sq mi)
- Elevation: 140 m (460 ft)

Population (2025)
  - Total: 649
- Time zone: UTC+1 (CET)
  - Summer (DST): UTC+2 (CEST)
- Postal code: 935 77
- Area code: +421 36
- Vehicle registration plate (until 2022): LV
- Website: www.vyskovcenadiplom.sk

Vyškovce nad Ipľom (Hungarian: Ipolyvisk) is a village and municipality in the Levice District in the Nitra Region of Slovakia.

== History ==
In historical records the village was first mentioned in 1156, whilst the castle was mentioned first in 1296, when Andrew III of Hungary confiscated it from the sons of Jakab Cseszneky because of the disloyalty of the Csesznekys and donated the castle to János (Csák's son) of the clan Csák. Later the Koháry, Esterházy, Forgách, and Breuner families were the most important landlords in the village.

== Geography ==
The municipality lies at an altitude of 140 metres (460 ft) and covers an area of 19.29 km^{2} (7.45 sq mi) (2025).

== Population ==
Population statistic (10 years)
Year	1995	2005	2015	2025
Count	693	693	675	649
Difference		+0%	−2.59%	−3.85%

Population statistic
Year	2024	2025
Count	652	649
Difference		−0.46%

It has a population of 649 people (31 December 2025).

=== Ethnicity ===
Census 2021 (1+ %)
Ethnicity	Number	Fraction
Hungarian	415	63.35%
Slovak	235	35.87%
Romani	84	12.82%
Not found out	46	7.02%
Total	655	

In year 2021 was 655 people by ethnicity 415 as Hungarian, 235 as Slovak, 84 as Romani, 46 as Not found out and 4 as Czech.

Note on population: The difference values of population numbers in the table "Population statistic" and in the sections "Ethnicity" & "Religion" is caused by the use of various statistical methods.

=== Religion ===
Census 2021 (1+ %)
Religion	Number	Fraction
Roman Catholic Church	499	76.18%
None	77	11.76%
Not found out	37	5.65%
Christian Congregations in Slovakia	15	2.29%
Calvinist Church	12	1.83%
Total	655	

In year 2021 was 655 people by religion 499 from Roman Catholic Church, 77 from None, 37 from Not found out, 15 from Christian Congregations in Slovakia, 12 from Calvinist Church, 6 from Greek Catholic Church, 5 from Evangelical Church, 2 from Jehovah's Witnesses, 1 from Other and 1 from Ad hoc movements.

== Facilities ==
The village has a public library and football pitch.
