= Bálint Drugeth =

Judge royal of Hungarian Kingdom (1577 - 1609)

Judge royal
- Reign: 1608–1609
- Predecessor: Zsigmond Forgách
- Successor: Zsigmond Forgách
- Born: 1577
- Died: 7 November 1609 (aged 31–32); Ungvár, Kingdom of Hungary (today: Uzhhorod, Ukraine)
- Noble family: House of Drugeth
- Spouses: Erzsébet Rákóczi; Krisztina Horváth
- Issue: István (d. 1610)
- Father: István Drugeth
- Mother: Fruzsina Török

Bálint Drugeth de Geren et Homonna (Hungarian: gereni és homonnai Drugeth Bálint; 1577 – 7 November 1609), also anglicized as Valentine Drugeth, was judge royal of the Kingdom of Hungary from 1608 to 1609.

== Early life ==
Bálint was the son of István Drugeth, ispán (or head) of Ung County, and Fruzsina Török. He was born in 1577.

== Career ==
He joined Stephen Bocskai in early 1605. Bocskai named Drugeth his successor in his last will.

== Sources ==
- Andea, Susana (2009). "Political Evolution in the 17th Century-From Stephen Bocskai to Michael Apafi". In Pop, Ioan-Aurel; Nägler, Thomas; Magyari, András (eds.). The History of Transylvania, Vo. II (From 1541 to 1711). Romanian Academy, Center for Transylvanian Studies. pp. 113–131. ISBN 978-973-7784-04-9.
- Markó, László (2000). A magyar állam főméltóságai Szent Istvántól napjainkig: Életrajzi Lexikon [Great Officers of State in Hungary from King Saint Stephen to Our Days: A Biographical Encyclopedia] (in Hungarian). Magyar Könyvklub. ISBN 963-547-085-1.

Bálint Drugeth House of Drugeth Born: 1577 Died: 7 November 1609
Political offices
Preceded by Zsigmond Forgách	Judge royal 1608–1609	Succeeded by Zsigmond Forgách
