= John Csák =

Hungarian baron

Judge royal
- Reign: 1311–1314
- Predecessor: vacant, before Stephen Ákos
- Successor: Lampert Hermán
- Died: before 1324
- Noble family: gens Csák
- Father: Csák

John from the kindred Csák (Hungarian: Csák nembeli János; died before 1324) was a Hungarian baron at the turn of the 13th and 14th centuries. He served as Master of the horse in the 1290s. Following the extinction of the Árpád dynasty, he initially supported pretender Wenceslaus, but later joined the allegiance of Charles I. He was made Judge royal in 1311, putting end to a more than ten years of vacancy. He betrayed the King and joined his distant relative, the rebellious oligarch Matthew Csák in 1314.

== Early career ==
John was born into the Újlak (Ilok) branch of the extended and powerful gens (clan) Csák. His father was Csák, who was mentioned by contemporary records in the period between 1240 and 1274. John had numerous illustrious close relatives, including his second cousin Ugrin Csák, the de facto ruler of Upper Syrmia in the early 14th century. John had no known descendants.

John first appeared in contemporary documents in 1295, although two non-authentic charters refer to him as Master of the horse and ispán of Baranya County in July 1290. He was considered a supporter of Andrew III, the last Hungarian monarch from the Árpád dynasty. For his court service, John was granted the castle of Visk (or Wysk) and its surrounding lands in Hont County (present-day Vyškovce nad Ipľom in Slovakia) on 25 April 1296. He served as Master of the horse in 1297, replacing his relative Matthew Csák. He is the last known person, who held the dignity during the Age of Árpáds. He functioned as ispán of Hont County in 1298. He was ispán of Baranya County in 1300. It is plausible that his latter function was highly nominal, as the county was ruled by the Kőszegi family, in addition to other parts of Transdanubia.

== During the Interregnum ==
Andrew III died on 14 January 1301. A civil war between various claimants to the throne—Charles of Anjou, Wenceslaus of Bohemia, and Otto of Bavaria—followed Andrew's death and lasted for seven years. Initially, John supported Wenceslaus in the war of succession, despite that Ugrin Csák, also from the clan's Újlak branch, was considered the strongest domestic pillar of Charles' dominion in the early years. John was first styled as a "baron" and member of the royal court of Wenceslaus in 1303. In the same year, the young king transcribed and confirmed the letter donation of the late Andrew III, regarding the ownership of Visk.

By 1307, John Csák took an oath of allegiance to Charles of Anjou. He played an important role in the capture of Buda in June. Returning from his Bohemian captivity, the ex-rector Ladislaus, son of Werner marched into the town with the assistance of John Csák's troops. As the Illuminated Chronicle narrates, Ladislaus and John infiltrated into the fort through the gate next to the Jewish synagogue at night. Their troops clashed with the guards of the city magistrate, who refused to acknowledge Charles as their legitimate king. The pro-Wenceslaus rector Petermann escaped from the scene without clothing, while other German burghers were tortured and massacred. John captured and sent to the court of Archbishop Thomas of Esztergom those local pro-Wenceslaus clergymen, who even excommunicated Pope Boniface VIII prior to that, and were labelled as heretics. Historian Gyula Kristó analyzed the royal documents of the decade and placed John to the fifth or sixth most prominent partisan of Charles I in the subsequent years.

== Judge royal and betrayal ==
John Csák was mentioned as "designate" (Latin: deputatus) Judge royal on 10 March 1311. His position's austerity indicator was already omitted in the following mention, on 7 May. Historian Pál Engel considered the dignity of Judge royal was vacant during the period of the Interregnum, at least since 1301, when the Kingdom of Hungary had disintegrated into autonomous provinces ruled by powerful oligarchs. Prior to John's appointment, a certain comes Peter was referred as Judge royal, who issued a charter in September 1301 in Buda in this capacity. Historian Iván Bertényi Sr. argues that nobleman served in the court of Wenceslaus. The 18th-century Liber Dignitariorum Saecularium also mentions a certain Stephen as a Judge royal (possibly for Charles I) from 1301 to 1304, who simultaneously held the office of ispán of Sáros County. A vice-Judge royal Thomas also appeared in contemporary documents in the same period, between 1302 and 1305, and styled himself as "king Ladislaus's [i.e. Wenceslaus] Judge royal". According to the often unreliable Liber Dignitariorum Saecularium, Ugrin Csák also served as Judge royal between 1304 and 1311, until his death. Bertényi has accepted this information, referring to some data which reflect Ugrin's jurisdictional role on isolated occasions. However, majority of historians, including John Csák's biographer Ildikó Tóth accept Pál Engel's theory and consider that the position of Judge royal was in a state of vacancy for a decade, until Charles's third coronation was performed in full accordance with customary law in August 1310. Tóth argues that Ugrin Csák performed his judicial role exclusively in his province in Syrmia, thus he did not held the dignity of Judge royal necessarily.

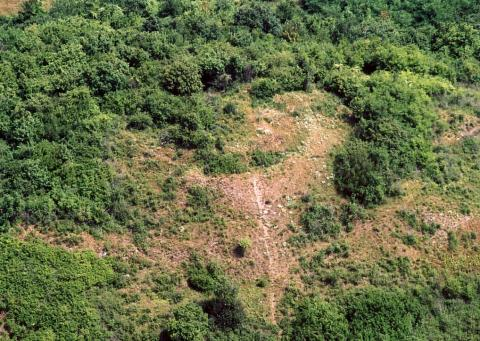
The ruins of Ecseg Castle, which was owned by John Csák until his high treason

During his tenure as Judge royal, John Csák resided in Buda and performed his judicial role with countrywide competence. For instance, he judged over the Valkó County nobles' abuse of power case in August 1313, while in other occasions, he instructed the cathedral chapter of Gyulafehérvár (present-day Alba Iulia, Romania) during a land property lawsuit, and the cathedral chapter of Győr during an investigation. Historian Ildikó Tóth emphasizes that many of John's legal cases were originally belonged to the judicial courts of the oligarchic provinces. Following the establishment of the strong royal power, John Csák took over and conducted these lawsuits. He was the first Judge royal, who has placed great emphasis on material evidences during his litigation processes.

John Csák was last referred to as Judge royal on 12 July 1314. According to a royal charter from the next year, he betrayed Charles I and joined to the allegiance of his distant relative, Matthew Csák, who was the most ardent enemy of the king, and ruled de facto independently the north-western counties of the kingdom. John's motivation is unknown, but the year of 1314 saw a large-scale replacement of the former elite, when Charles decided to struggle the oligarchs' power (Palatine James Borsa was also dismissed during that time) and appointed his supporters to the dignities. As the monarch narrates in 1324, John Csák conspired with the oligarch against him, and tried to hand him over to Matthew Csák. As John's successor Lampert Hermán already appeared as Judge royal in a contemporary record on 29 September 1313, a scholarly debate emerged on the relevance of the aforementioned charter. Pál Engel declared the year of release is invalid and fixed it to 29 September 1314. In contrast, Iván Bertényi argued John Csák and Lampert Hermán simultaneously held the dignity for a time until 1315, similarly to that case, where many oligarchs were styled themselves palatines during the era of feudal anarchy. As this would be a unique solution in the history of the position, both Ildikó Tóth and Gyula Kristó refused Bertényi's theory and supported Engel's idea about the wrong date. Thus John Csák's betrayal happened in the summer of 1314. After his unsuccessful abduction attempt, he fled to the dominion of Matthew Csák, where he died "miserably" sometime before 1324, as the king formulates. In that year, Charles I donated John's formerly confiscated lands, which laid in Pest, Szolnok, Hont, Nógrád and Moson counties. Heretofore, John also owned (and possibly built himself) the castle of Ecseg in Nógrád County, which then became a property of Wulfing I Haschendorfer and his family (later the Szécsényis demolished the fort). In the donation letter of 1324, Charles called his former courtier and judge as "treasonous Judas Iscariot".

== Sources ==
- Bertényi, Iván (1976). Az országbírói intézmény története a XIV. században [History of the Institution of Judge Royal in the 14th Century] (in Hungarian). Hungarian Academy of Sciences. ISBN 963-05-0734-X.
- Engel, Pál (1996). Magyarország világi archontológiája, 1301–1457, I. [Secular Archontology of Hungary, 1301–1457, Volume I] (in Hungarian). História, MTA Történettudományi Intézete. ISBN 963-8312-44-0.
- Kristó, Gyula (1999). "I. Károly király főúri elitje (1301–1309) [The Aristocratic Elite of King Charles I, 1301–1309]". Századok (in Hungarian). 133 (1). Magyar Történelmi Társulat: 41–62. ISSN 0039-8098.
- Markó, László (2006). A magyar állam főméltóságai Szent Istvántól napjainkig: Életrajzi Lexikon [Great Officers of State in Hungary from King Saint Stephen to Our Days: A Biographical Encyclopedia] (in Hungarian). Helikon Kiadó. ISBN 963-547-085-1.
- Tóth, Ildikó (1999). "Károly Róbert első országbírója (Adalékok Csák János országbírói működéséhez) [Charles Robert's First Judge Royal: Data to the Function of John Csák as Judge Royal]". In Homonnai, Sarolta; Piti, Ferenc; Tóth, Ildikó (eds.). Tanulmányok a középkori magyar történelemről. Az I. Medievisztikai PhD-konferencia (Szeged, 1999. július 2.) előadásai (in Hungarian). University of Szeged. pp. 143–150. ISBN 963-482-421-8.
- Zsoldos, Attila (2011). Magyarország világi archontológiája, 1000–1301 [Secular Archontology of Hungary, 1000–1301] (in Hungarian). História, MTA Történettudományi Intézete. ISBN 978-963-9627-38-3.

John Genus Csák Born: ? Died: 1315/24
Political offices
Preceded by James Borsa (?)	Master of the horse disputed 1290	Succeeded by Mikó Szécs
Preceded by Matthew Csák	Master of the horse 1297	Succeeded by Kakas Rátót (?)
Vacant Title last held by Stephen Ákos	Judge royal 1311–1314	Succeeded by Lampert Hermán
