= Rednald =

Judge royal uncertain
- Reign: 1145
- Predecessor: George, son of Cronik
- Successor: Cadarius

Rednald was a nobleman in the Kingdom of Hungary, who, according to a non-authentic charter, served as Judge royal (Latin: curialis comes) in 1145, during the reign of Géza II of Hungary.

== Sources ==
- (in Hungarian) Zsoldos, Attila (2011). Magyarország világi archontológiája, 1000–1301 ("Secular Archontology of Hungary, 1000–1301"). História, MTA Történettudományi Intézete. Budapest. ISBN 978-963-9627-38-3

Political offices
Preceded by George, son of Cronik	Judge royal uncertain 1145	Succeeded by Cadarius
