= Demetrius I Csák =

Hungarian baron

Demetrius (I) Csák
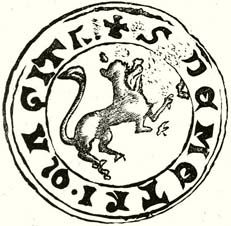
- Seal of Demetrius Csák

Judge royal
- Reign: 1232–1234; 1242–1244
- Predecessor: Benedict, son of Samud (1st term); Ladislaus Kán (2nd term)
- Successor: Ladislaus Kán (1st term); Stephen Gutkeled (2nd term)
- Died: after 1254
- Noble family: gens Csák
- Spouse: unknown
- Issue: Ugod; Csák a daughter
- Father: Luka

Demetrius I from the kindred Csák (Hungarian: Csák nembeli (I.) Demeter; died after 1254) was a Hungarian baron, who held secular positions during the reign of kings Andrew II and Béla IV.

== Career ==
Demetrius I belonged to the Ugod branch of the Csák clan as the son of Luka. Possibly he had a brother Adam. From his unidentified wife, he had two sons (Ugod and Csák) and a daughter, who married Csépán II Győr, son of Palatine Csépán I Győr.

He was loyal to King Andrew II. He served as Master of the stewards (Latin: senescalcus) for thirteen years between 1217 and 1230. Beside that he was also ispán of Vas County from 1219 to 1222. He participated in the Fifth Crusade under the command of Andrew II between 1217 and 1218. Returning home, he governed Pozsony County from 1224 to 1229. After 1230, he became a supporter of Duke Béla. He was appointed Judge royal in 1232 and held that dignity until 1234. He was also ispán of Bács County during that time, from 1233 to 1234.

Prior to 1225, Demetrius was granted the royal castle of Németújvár (present-day Güssing in Austria) by Andrew II. Consequently, Demetrius became the first known member of his kindred, who owned a castle. It is plausible that Demetrius acquired the fort, when he served as ispán of Vas County, where the castle is located. The Pannonhalma Archabbey, which once possessed Küszén Abbey, the short-lived predecessor of the castle, continuously petitioned against Andrew's decision to the Holy See, who urged Demetrius several times to recover Németújvár to the Benedictine friars, but he refused to do that. As a result, Pope Gregory IX excommunicated Demetrius in 1228 or 1229. When the pope sent another complaint to the new king, Béla IV in 1238, Demetrius still possessed the castle. It is plausible that Demetrius owned Németújvár until his death; the next mention of the castle is from 1263, long after his death. Demetrius also seized Abda from the Benedictines and Merenye from the Diocese of Veszprém.

From 1238 to 1241, now during the reign of Béla IV, Demetrius served as ispán of Csanád County. He was appointed Judge royal for the second time in 1242 and held the office until 1244, however according to non-authentic royal charters he was Judge royal still in 1245 and 1246. During that time, he also functioned as head of Moson County. According to a non-authentic diploma, he served as Judge royal and ispán of Bodrog County in 1246. He died after 1254.

== Sources ==
- Horváth, Richárd (2015). "A favár rejtélye, avagy mennyire régi Újvár vára?: Németújvár várának "vélelmezett" története a kezdetektől a 13. század végéig [The Mystery of the Wooden Fort, or How Old is Újvár?: The "Presumed" History of the Castle of Németújvár from the Beginning to the End of the 13th Century]". Castrum. 18 (1–2). Castrum Bene Egyesület: 5–24.
- Markó, László (2006). A magyar állam főméltóságai Szent Istvántól napjainkig: Életrajzi Lexikon [Great Officers of State in Hungary from King Saint Stephen to Our Days: A Biographical Encyclopedia] (in Hungarian). Helikon Kiadó. ISBN 963-208-970-7.
- Zsoldos, Attila (2011). Magyarország világi archontológiája, 1000–1301 [Secular Archontology of Hungary, 1000–1301] (in Hungarian). História, MTA Történettudományi Intézete. ISBN 978-963-9627-38-3.

Demetrius I Genus Csák Born: ? Died: after 1254
Political offices
Preceded by Simon Kacsics	Master of the stewards 1217–1230	Succeeded by File Szeretvai
Preceded by Benedict, son of Samud	Judge royal 1232–1234	Succeeded by Ladislaus Kán
Preceded by Ladislaus Kán	Judge royal 1242–1244	Succeeded by Stephen Gutkeled
