= Ádám Forgách =

Hungarian soldier and magnate

- Count of Ghymes and Gács
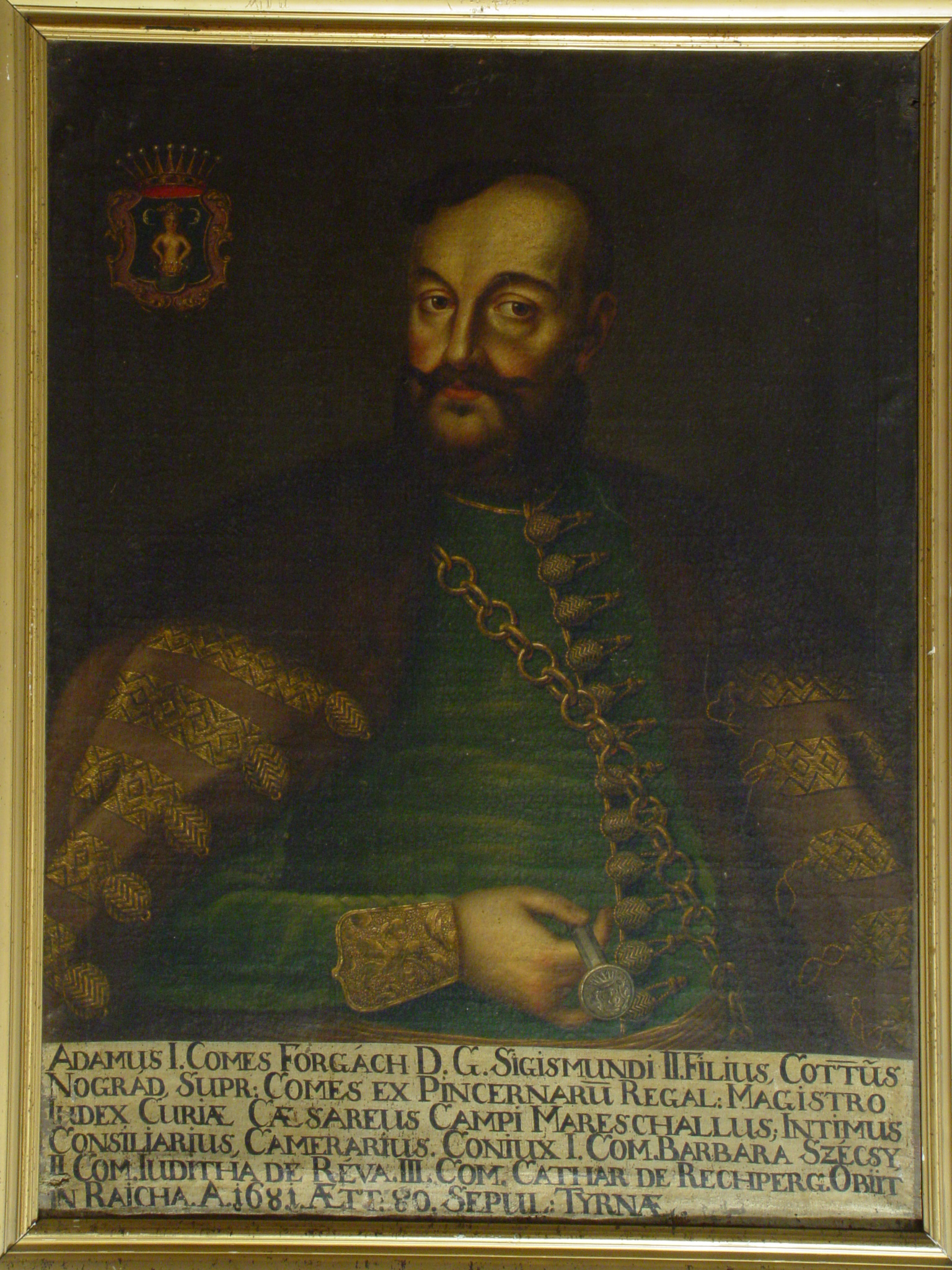

Judge Royal
- Reign: 13 October 1670 – 10 June 1681
- Predecessor: Ferenc Nádasdy
- Successor: Nikola II Drašković
- Full name: Count Ádám Forgách de Ghymes et Gács
- Born: 1601
- Died: 10 June 1681 (approx. 80 years old); Rajka, Kingdom of Hungary
- Noble family: House of Forgách
- Spouses: Countess Borbála Széchy de Rimaszécs; Baroness Judit Révay de Sklabina et Blathnicza; Countess Anna Katharina von Rechberg
- Father: Baron Zsigmond Forgách de Ghymes et Gács
- Mother: Countess Zsuzsanna Thurzó de Bethlenfalva
- Occupation: Soldier, Politician

Count Ádám Forgách de Ghymes et Gács (Slovak: Adam Forgáč; 1601 – 10 June 1681) was a Hungarian soldier and magnate in the Kingdom of Hungary, who served as Judge Royal from 13 October 1670 until his death. He was the eldest son of Baron Zsigmond Forgách, Palatine of Hungary.

== Life ==
In May 1643, he became the captain of the Nové Zámky fortress.
In August 1652, he organized the defense against the marauding Turkish troops, which he faced on 26 August 1652 near Veľké Vozokany. He defeated the Turkish troops in the two-day Battle of Vezekény.

After the outbreak of the Austro-Turkish War (1663–1664), he allowed himself to be outwitted by the Turks and, without a sufficient survey of the situation, launched an attack against allegedly weakened Turkish troops near Štúrovo. In reality, however, the Turks had prepared a trap for his troops, and in the Battle of Köbölkút on August 6, 1663, only less than 400 of his 5,500 soldiers were saved. Forgáč himself escaped.

An Ottoman force of about 50,000 men advanced on Nové Zámky and demanded his surrender, which he refused. The city was shelled by Ottoman artillery. On September 22, 1663, an accident occurred in which a storehouse of gunpowder exploded in a bastion. Further defense of the city was impossible. After a month and a half long siege, he was forced to surrender to the troops of Grand Vizier Ahmed Köprülü. The loss of Nové Zámky resulted in the loss of other towns from Levice to Nitra. Western Slovakia was subjected to Ottoman looting. Ottoman forces penetrated as far as Moravia.

He was court-martialled for his military failures, but was eventually acquitted. From 1670 until his death, he was a Judge Royal.

== Sources ==
- Markó, László: A magyar állam főméltóságai Szent Istvántól napjainkig - Életrajzi Lexikon p. 280. (The High Officers of the Hungarian State from Saint Stephen to the Present Days - A Biographical Encyclopedia) (2nd edition); Helikon Kiadó Kft., 2006, Budapest; ISBN 963-547-085-1.
- Szabó de Bártfa, László: A Hunt-Pázmán nemzetségbeli Forgách család története History of the Forgách family from the kindred of Hont-Pázmány; 1910, Esztergom.
