= George (judge royal) =

Hungarian nobleman

Judge royal
- Reign: c. 1127–1131
- Predecessor: first known
- Successor: Julius

George (Hungarian: György) was a nobleman in the Kingdom of Hungary, the first known Judge royal (Latin: curialis comes), who held the position around between 1127 and 1131, during the reign of Stephen II of Hungary. The dignity developed from some jurisdictional roles of the Palatine of Hungary (management of the royal household, representing the King at the Court of Personal Presence, etc.).

== Sources ==
- (in Hungarian) Markó, László: A magyar állam főméltóságai Szent Istvántól napjainkig – Életrajzi Lexikon (The High Officers of the Hungarian State from Saint Stephen to the Present Days – A Biographical Encyclopedia) (2nd edition); Helikon Kiadó Kft., 2006, Budapest; ISBN 963-547-085-1.
- (in Hungarian) Zsoldos, Attila (2011). Magyarország világi archontológiája, 1000–1301 ("Secular Archontology of Hungary, 1000–1301"). História, MTA Történettudományi Intézete. Budapest. ISBN 978-963-9627-38-3

Political offices
Preceded by first known	Judge royal c. 1127–1131	Succeeded by Julius
