= Gbelce =

Gbelce Köbölkút
- Municipality
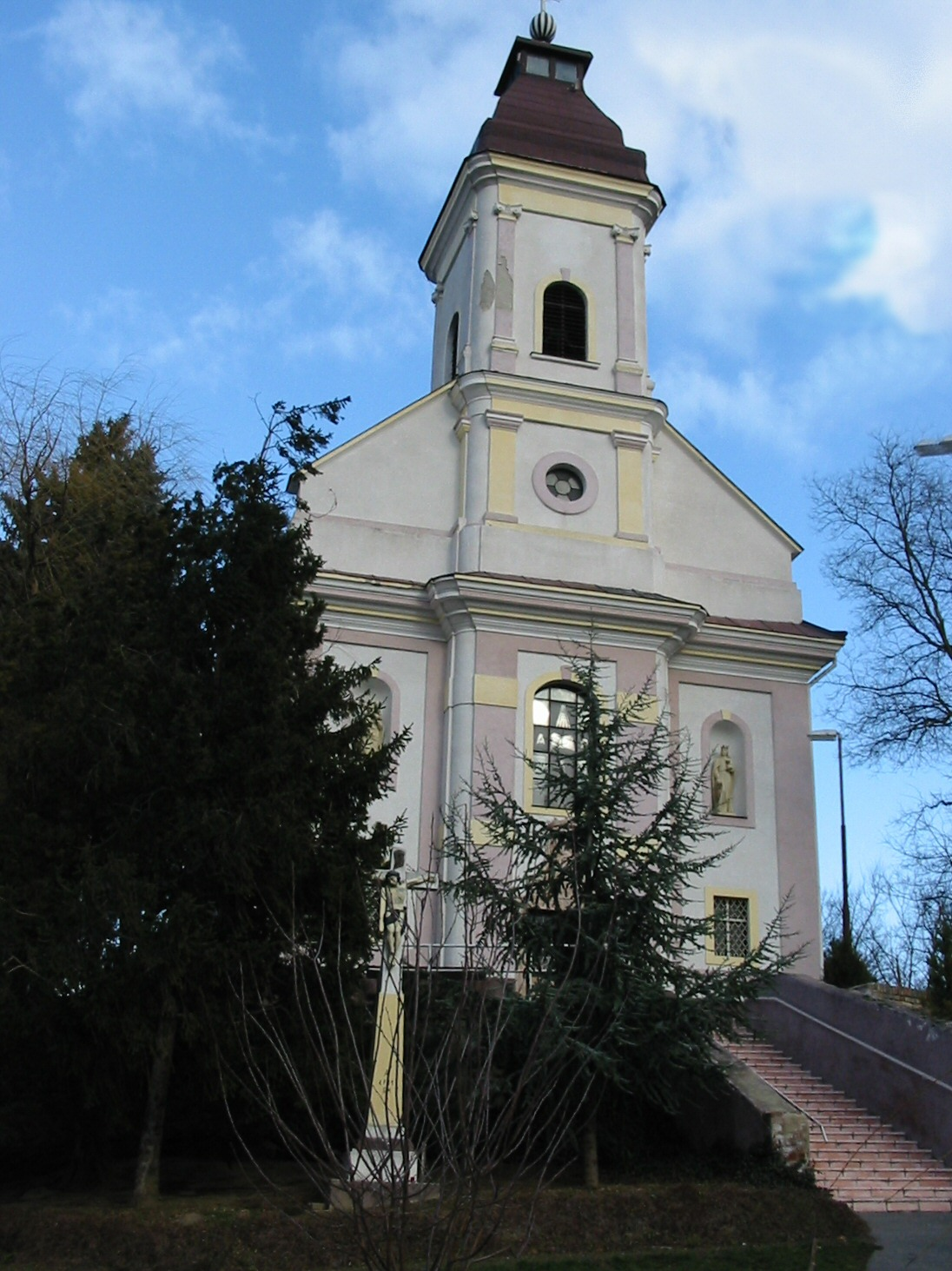

- Flag

- Location of Gbelce in the Nitra Region Location of Gbelce in Slovakia
- Coordinates: 47.85°N 18.52°E
- Country: Slovakia
- Region: Nitra Region
- District: Nové Zámky District
- First mentioned: 1233

Government
  - Mayor: František Szőcs

Area
  - Total: 26.61 km^{2} (10.27 sq mi)
- Elevation: 133 m (436 ft)

Population (2025)
  - Total: 2,036
- Time zone: UTC+1 (CET)
  - Summer (DST): UTC+2 (CEST)
- Postal code: 943 42
- Area code: +421 36
- Vehicle registration plate (until 2022): NZ
- Website: www.gbelce.sk

Gbelce (Hungarian: Köbölkút) is a municipality and village in the Nové Zámky District in the Nitra Region of south-west Slovakia.

== Geography ==
The municipality lies at an altitude of 133 metres (436 ft) and covers an area of 26.61 km^{2} (10.27 sq mi) (2025).

== History ==
In historical records, the village was first mentioned in 1233, when Peter Köbölkúti possessed the settlement. The battle of Köbölkút occurred here in 1663. In the 9th century, the territory of Kamenín became part of the Kingdom of Hungary. After the Austro-Hungarian army disintegrated in November 1918, Czechoslovak troops occupied the area, later acknowledged internationally by the Treaty of Trianon. Between 1938 and 1945 Kamenín once more became part of Miklós Horthy's Hungary through the First Vienna Award. From 1945 until the Velvet Divorce, it was part of Czechoslovakia. Since then it has been part of Slovakia.

== Population ==
Population statistic (10 years)
Year	1995	2005	2015	2025
Count	2393	2269	2203	2036
Difference		−5.18%	−2.90%	−7.58%

Population statistic
Year	2024	2025
Count	2051	2036
Difference		−0.73%

It has a population of 2036 people (31 December 2025).

=== Ethnicity ===
Census 2021 (1+ %)
Ethnicity	Number	Fraction
Hungarian	1432	67.45%
Slovak	664	31.27%
Not found out	146	6.87%
Total	2123	

In year 2021 was 2123 people by ethnicity 1432 as Hungarian, 664 as Slovak, 146 as Not found out, 16 as Czech, 4 as Romani, 4 as Other, 3 as Vietnamese, 2 as Jewish, 1 as Italian, 1 as Russian, 1 as Romanian, 1 as French and 1 as Albanian.

Note on population: The difference values of population numbers in the table "Population statistic" and in the sections "Ethnicity" & "Religion" is caused by the use of various statistical methods.

=== Religion ===
Census 2021 (1+ %)
Religion	Number	Fraction
Roman Catholic Church	1350	63.59%
None	488	22.99%
Not found out	143	6.74%
Calvinist Church	55	2.59%
Evangelical Church	32	1.51%
Total	2123	

In year 2021 was 2123 people by religion 1350 from Roman Catholic Church, 488 from None, 143 from Not found out, 55 from Calvinist Church, 32 from Evangelical Church, 16 from Greek Catholic Church, 15 from Christian Congregations in Slovakia, 7 from Buddhism, 5 from Jehovah's Witnesses, 4 from Other, 3 from Old Catholic Church, 2 from Islam, 2 from United Methodist Church and 1 from Seventh-day Adventist Church.

== Facilities ==
The village has a public library a gym and football pitch.

== Genealogical resources ==
The records for genealogical research are available at the state archive "Statny Archiv in Nitra, Slovakia"

- Roman Catholic church records (births/marriages/deaths): 1868-1895 (parish A)
- Reformated church records (births/marriages/deaths): 1824-1953 (parish B)

== See also ==
- List of municipalities and towns in Slovakia
