= Rubinus Hermán =

Hungarian soldier and nobleman

Judge royal
- Reign: 1283
- Predecessor: John
- Successor: Amadeus Aba
- Died: after 1283
- Noble family: gens Hermán
- Father: Herman

Rubinus from the kindred Hermán (Hungarian: Hermán nembeli Rubinus, also Rubin or Ruben; died after 1283) was a Hungarian soldier and nobleman, who served as Judge royal in 1283, during the reign of Ladislaus IV of Hungary.

== Family ==
Rubinus was born into the gens (clan) Hermán as the son of comes Herman, whose parents are unidentified, as a result there is inability to connect his person to the three known branches of the clan in the genealogy, but his activity and land properties confirmed, he belonged to the kindred's ancient Vas County branch. Rubinus had two brothers, Feldricus and Charles. According to the contemporary Simon of Kéza's Gesta Hunnorum et Hungarorum, the ancestor of the Hermán kindred, knight Herman originated from Nuremberg, who escorted Gisela of Bavaria to Hungary in 996. She became the wife of Stephen I of Hungary, the future first King of Hungary. Following that Herman received land donations in Vas County. Both magister Simon and the 14th-century Illuminated Chronicle described the Hermán kindred as "relatively poor".

== Military career ==
Taking into account data from the 13th century, historian Attila Zsoldos argued Rubinus and his kindred elevated from the status of royal servant to the Hungarian nobility. King Ladislaus the Cuman's royal charter from 1280 narrated the military career of Rubinus since the early 1260s. As it wrote, Rubinus was already a loyal soldier to Béla IV of Hungary. He participated in the Battle of Kressenbrunn in July 1260, when King Béla, Duke Stephen and their allies invaded Moravia, but Ottokar II of Bohemia vanquished them, forcing Béla to renounce Styria in favor of Ottokar. According to the charter, Rubinus "fought with courage", while received "three wounds".

After ten years, following Béla's death, when Stephen V succeeded his father without difficulties, Nicholas Hahót refused to attend the coronation ceremony took place on or after 17 May 1270. Instead, he garrisoned Styrian soldiers in his fort at Pölöske, and made plundering raids against the nearby villages. In November, Rubinus participated in the royal campaign to crush Nicholas' rebellion, defeating the army of knights Solchar and Dietrich, who looted Vas County at the Austrian border. Rubinus captured Solchar and other soldiers and delivered them to Stephen. The king launched a plundering raid into Styria around December 1270. Rubinus took part in the campaign under the command of Gregory Monoszló. He was present at the siege of Radkersburg, where fought with a spear and seriously injured. Despite that, thereafter he participated in the capture of Fürstenfeld, where he stormed the defenders at the castle gate with his small unit. Because of Rubinus' injures, historian Veronika Rudolf considered that the siege of Fürstenfeld took place earlier. Ottokar II invaded Hungary in the spring of 1271, capturing several forts, but Stephen won the decisive battle on the Rábca River on 21 May. At the gate of Abda, Rubinus "bravely defended the crossing".

=== Ladislaus' loyal soldier ===
Ladislaus IV was crowned in Székesfehérvár on about 3 September 1272. During his minority, many groupings of barons fought against each other for supreme power, but Rubinus remained faithful to the royal authority. Ladislaus' charter referred to an episode, when German knights, namely Conrad and Kunchlinus broke into Zagorje County, Rubinus stopped and chased their army. He also participated in Matthew Csák's military campaign in 1272 to besiege the fort of Lembach at the Carinthian border. On 3 August 1275, Rubinus and his two brothers, Feldricus and Charles were granted the estate of Petlend, belonged to Vasvár Castle, by King Ladislaus IV. During the Battle on the Marchfeld, took place on 26 August 1278, where Ottokar II was defeated and killed, Rubinus captured thirteen Bohemian lords, according to Ladislaus' charter. After the battle, Rubinus was appointed Vice-voivode of Transylvania (Latin: vicevoyvada) in that year (Finta Aba served as Voivode during that time). In this position, he was involved in a jurisdictional conflict with Palatine Matthew Csák, who urged the udvornici in Vas County, who were administered by the Palatine, to accept his candidate and deputy, comes Stephen to become their authorized captain and judge, in the name of Matthew Csák. His charter also referred that vice-voivode Rubinus had previously unilaterally appointed a judge, which he deemed unlawful. Based on the charter's terminology, it is conceivable that Rubinus already held the office of ispán of Vas County since that year.

In early 1280, papal legate Philip, Bishop of Fermo and the Hungarian lords extracted a ceremonious promise from the Cuman chieftains of giving up their pagan customs, and persuaded the young King Ladislaus to swear an oath to enforce the keeping of the Cuman chieftains' promise. Many Cumans decided to leave Hungary instead of obeying the legate's demands. Ladislaus followed the moving Cumans as far as Szalánkemén (now Stari Slankamen in Serbia), but could not hinder them from crossing the frontier. Rubinus, as leader of the udvornici from Vép participated in the campaign against the Cumans, where defeated them at Sövényvár in Csongrád County. Ladislaus' afore-mentioned charter was written on the occasion of this event. In the document, which already referred to him as ispán of Vas County, the King donated the lands of Vép and Szőlős (today part of Szombathely), both were originally part of the udvornici holdings, to Rubinus and his two brothers. On 10 March 1283, some castle warriors from Vép, who had participated in Rubinus' military actions against the Cumans, were elevated to the group of royal servants. It confirmed that he fought in the siege of Szalánc (today Slanec, Slovakia) in the summer of 1281, when the royal army annihilated the traitor Finta Aba's domain. The royal document referred to Rubinus as the incumbent Judge royal (in March 1283). This is the last piece of information on Rubinus. As he is the only known member of his kindred, the Hermáns, who operated in Transylvania, it is conceivable that he was an ancestor of 14th-century members, Judge royal Lampert and/or Lack, the forefather of the powerful Lackfi family.

== Sources ==
- Bényei, Balázs (2011). "Hermán nembeli Lampert országbíró tisztségbe jutásának körülményei [The Circumstances of the Appointment of Lampert of the kindred Hermán to the Office of Judge Royal]". In Mihalik, Béla Vilmos; Zarnóczki, Áron (eds.). Tanulmányok Badacsonyból. A Fiatal Levéltárosok Egyesületének konferenciája, Badacsony, 2010. július 9–10 (in Hungarian). Fiatal Levéltárosok Egyesülete. pp. 11–23. ISBN 978-963-08-3098-0.
- Blazovich, László; Érszegi, Géza; Turbuly, Éva (1998). Levéltárak–kincstárak. Források Magyarország levéltáraiból 1000–1686 [Archives – Treasures: Historical Sources from the Archives of Hungary, 1000–1686] (in Hungarian). Magyar Levéltárosok Egyesülete. ISBN 963-04-9965-7.
- Markó, László (2006). A magyar állam főméltóságai Szent Istvántól napjainkig: Életrajzi Lexikon [Great Officers of State in Hungary from King Saint Stephen to Our Days: A Biographical Encyclopedia] (in Hungarian). Helikon Kiadó. ISBN 963-547-085-1.
- Rudolf, Veronika (2023). Közép-Európa a hosszú 13. században [Central Europe in the Long 13th Century] (in Hungarian). Arpadiana XV., Research Centre for the Humanities. ISBN 978-963-416-406-7.
- Szentpétery, Imre (1961). Az Árpád-házi királyok okleveleinek kritikai jegyzéke II. kötet 2–3. füzet, 1272–1290 [A Critical Register of Royal Charters from the House of Árpád, Vol. 2. No. 2–3.] (in Hungarian). Magyar Országos Levéltár.
- Szőcs, Tibor (2012). Az Árpád-kori nádorok és helyetteseik okleveleinek kritikai jegyzéke [A Critical Register of Charters from Palatines and their Deputies of the Árpádian Era] (in Hungarian). Magyar Országos Levéltár. ISBN 978-963-631-219-0.
- Zsoldos, Attila (2011). Magyarország világi archontológiája, 1000–1301 [Secular Archontology of Hungary, 1000–1301] (in Hungarian). História, MTA Történettudományi Intézete. ISBN 978-963-9627-38-3.

Rubinus Genus Hermán Born: ? Died: after 1283
Political offices
Preceded by Bocha (?)	Vice-voivode of Transylvania; 1278	Succeeded by Nicholas
Preceded by John	Judge royal 1283	Succeeded by Amadeus Aba
