= George, son of Cronik =

Judge royal
- Reign: 1138
- Predecessor: Bucan (?)
- Successor: Rednald (?)
- Father: Cronik

George, son of Cronik (Hungarian: Cronik fia György) was a nobleman in the Kingdom of Hungary, who served as Judge royal (Latin: curie regalis officia disponens) in 1138, during the reign of Béla II of Hungary.

Before becoming Judge royal, George functioned as ispán of Zala County in 1137. His authority increasingly separated from the Palatine's who increasingly dealt with national issues, while the Judge royal George handled the affairs of the royal court. His name is mentioned in only one royal charter issued in September 1138, when a certain Fila donated his Örs estate to the chapter of Veszprém.

== Sources ==
- (in Hungarian) Markó, László: A magyar állam főméltóságai Szent Istvántól napjainkig – Életrajzi Lexikon (The High Officers of the Hungarian State from Saint Stephen to the Present Days – A Biographical Encyclopedia) (2nd edition); Helikon Kiadó Kft., 2006, Budapest; ISBN 963-547-085-1.
- (in Hungarian) Zsoldos, Attila (2011). Magyarország világi archontológiája, 1000–1301 ("Secular Archontology of Hungary, 1000–1301"). História, MTA Történettudományi Intézete. Budapest. ISBN 978-963-9627-38-3

Political offices
Preceded by Bucan (?)	Judge royal 1138	Succeeded by Rednald (?)
