= Battle of Köbölkút =

1663 battle

Coordinates: 47.85956930407352°N 18.519787040989662°E

- Part of the Austro-Turkish War (1663–1664)
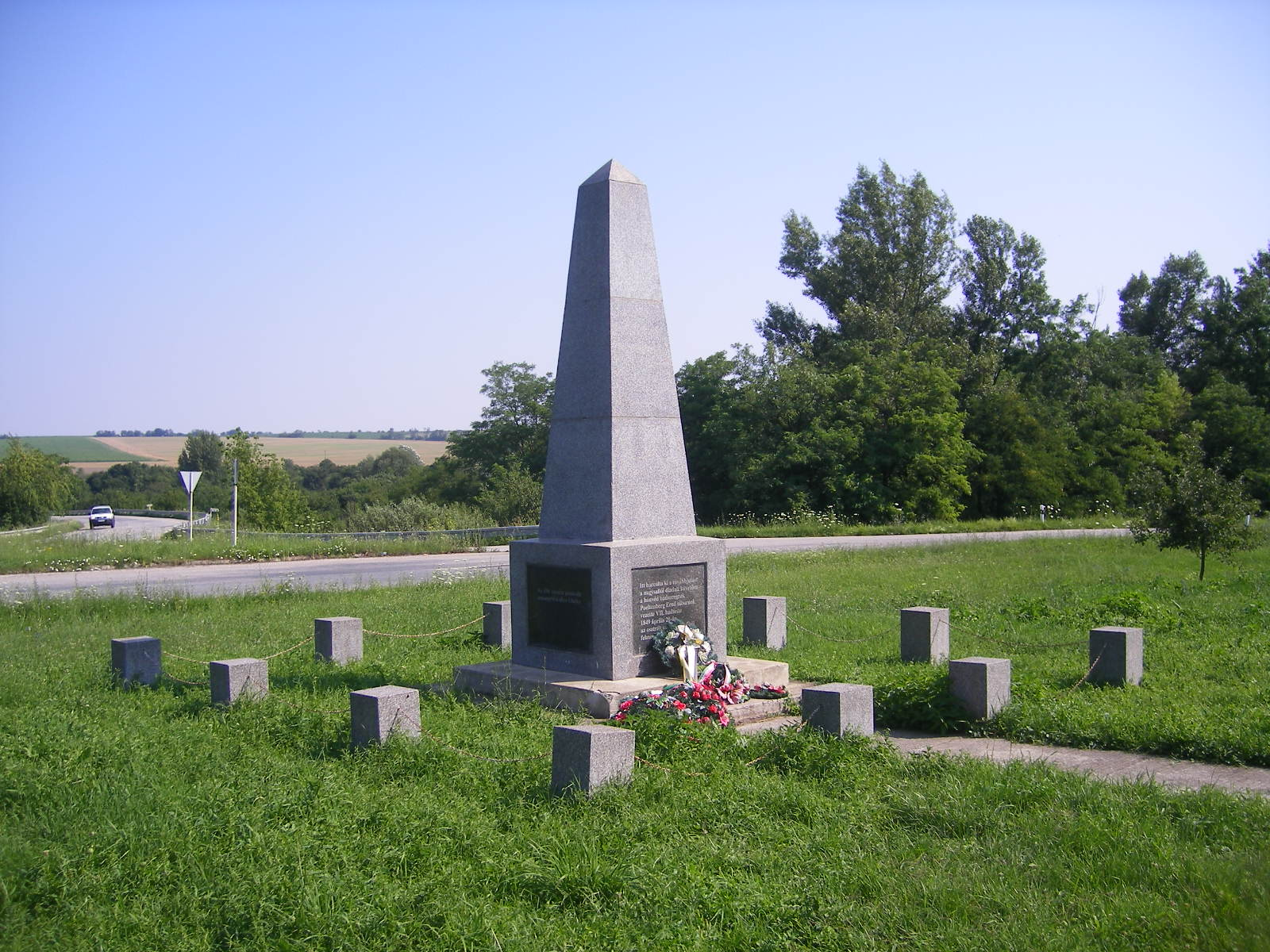
- battle memorial
Date	August 6, 1663
Location	Köbölkút, Hungary (present-day Gbelce, Slovakia)
Result	Ottoman victory

Belligerents
Habsburg Monarchy; Kingdom of Hungary	Ottoman Empire

Commanders and leaders
Ádám Forgách	Fazıl Ahmed

Strength
8,000	12,000

Casualties and losses
6,000 killed 1,000 captured	Unknown

The Battle of Köbölkút was fought on August 5, 1663 as part of the Austro-Turkish War (1663–1664), between a Habsburg army under the command of the Hungarian Ádám Forgách and an Ottoman army under the command of Grand Vizier Fazıl Ahmed Pasha. The battle took place near Köbölkút, Kingdom of Hungary in present day Gbelce in Slovakia and was an absolute Ottoman victory. The Ottomans captured the town and also large territories in modern day Slovakia.

== Sources ==
- Ferenc Tóth, Saint Gotthard 1664, une bataille Européenne, Éditions Lavauzelle, 2007. ISBN 978-2-7025-1064-3
- Sándor Szilágyi, A Magyar Nemzet Története IV. fejezet
