= Cadarius =

Hungarian noble in 1146

Judge royal
- Reign: 1146
- Predecessor: Rednald (?)
- Successor: Gereon

Cadarius was a nobleman in the Kingdom of Hungary who served as Judge royal (Latin: curialis comes) in 1146, during the reign of Géza II of Hungary. His name is mentioned by only one royal charter in 1146, where a certain "newcomer" (advena) noble Fulko donated his lands to the Abbey of Pannonhalma.

== Sources ==
- (in Hungarian) Markó, László: A magyar állam főméltóságai Szent Istvántól napjainkig – Életrajzi Lexikon (The High Officers of the Hungarian State from Saint Stephen to the Present Days – A Biographical Encyclopedia) (2nd edition); Helikon Kiadó Kft., 2006, Budapest; ISBN 963-547-085-1.
- (in Hungarian) Zsoldos, Attila (2011). Magyarország világi archontológiája, 1000–1301 ("Secular Archontology of Hungary, 1000–1301"). História, MTA Történettudományi Intézete. Budapest. ISBN 978-963-9627-38-3

Political offices
Preceded by Rednald (?)	Judge royal 1146	Succeeded by Gereon
