= Lawrence (judge royal) =

Judge royal
- Reign: 1164–1172
- Predecessor: Gabriel
- Successor: Cumpurdinus
- Died: after 1180; Duchy of Austria
- Spouse: Christina N
- Issue: Bethlehem

Lawrence (Hungarian: Lőrinc; died after 1180) was a nobleman in the Kingdom of Hungary, who served as Judge royal (Latin: curialis comes) between 1164 and 1172, during the reign of Stephen III of Hungary.

He was loyal to Géza II of Hungary as, according to a royal charter issued in 1212, he held the positions of ispán of Sopron and Vas Counties for at most more than twenty years, from 1141 to 1162. When he was already Judge royal, a non-authentic charter also refers to him as ispán of Sopron County therefore it is conceivable that Lawrence held both ispánates until his end of career and residence in Hungary.

When the civil war broke out between Stephen III, who ascended the throne after the death of his father Géza II, and his uncles (Ladislaus and Stephen IV) in 1162, Lawrence supported the young king. He was mentioned among the great barons in 1162. He was appointed Judge royal in 1164, replacing Gabriel. In 1172, when Lucas, Archbishop of Esztergom refused to perform the coronation of Béla III, who had returned from Constantinople, Lawrence and numerous other barons followed the archbishop and supported Prince Géza, the youngest surviving son of the late Géza II.

However Béla III was able to strengthen his power and was crowned by the Archbishop of Kalocsa who was authorized by Pope Alexander III in early 1173. According to a Bohemian chronicle (Continuatio Gerlaci abbatis Milovicensis), Béla imprisoned his younger brother, Géza, who however escaped from prison and fled to Austria in 1174, alongside Lawrence who also had fled the country and died in exile sometime later.

Lawrence and his wife Christina spent their years in exile in Austria around 1180, when received a letter from Stephen, the abbot of Abbey of St Genevieve in Paris, who informed them their son Bethlehem, who was sent to the abbey to get higher education, died of illness. The abbot assured them that their son died without leaving a debt, and Stephen thanked the donation sent earlier for the abbey (golds, chasubles, horses and banners).

== Sources ==
- Györffy, György (1994). "Jób esztergomi érsek kapcsolata III. Béla királlyal és szerepe a magyar egyházi művelődésben [The Franco-Hungarian Connections of Job, Archbishop of Esztergom (1185–1201)]". Aetas. 9 (1). AETAS Könyv- és Lapkiadó Egyesület: 58–63.
- Makk, Ferenc (1989). The Árpáds and the Comneni: Political Relations between Hungary and Byzantium in the 12th century (Translated by György Novák). Akadémiai Kiadó. ISBN 963-05-5268-X.
- Markó, László (2006). A magyar állam főméltóságai Szent Istvántól napjainkig: Életrajzi Lexikon [Great Officers of State in Hungary from King Saint Stephen to Our Days: A Biographical Encyclopedia] (in Hungarian). Helikon Kiadó. ISBN 963-547-085-1.
- Zsoldos, Attila (2011). Magyarország világi archontológiája, 1000–1301 [Secular Archontology of Hungary, 1000–1301] (in Hungarian). História, MTA Történettudományi Intézete. ISBN 978-963-9627-38-3.

Political offices
Preceded by Gabriel	Judge royal 1164–1172	Succeeded by Cumpurdinus
