= Ladislaus I Kán =

Hungarian baron

Ladislaus (I) Kán
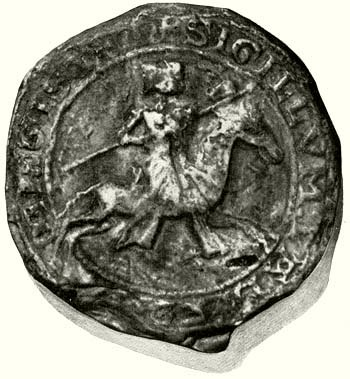
- Seal of Ladislaus I Kán (1236)

Palatine of Hungary
- Reign: 1242–1245
- Predecessor: Arnold Hahót
- Successor: Denis Türje
- Died: after 1247
- Noble family: gens Kán
- Spouse: unknown
- Issue: Ladislaus II; Julius III; Nicholas a daughter
- Father: Julius I
- Mother: Helena N

Ladislaus I from the kindred Kán (Hungarian: Kán nembeli (I.) László; fl. 1217–1247) was a powerful Hungarian baron, who held several secular positions during the reign of kings Andrew II and Béla IV.

== Family ==
Ladislaus was born into the prestigious gens Kán as the son of Julius I Kán, one of the most trusted noblemen of King Andrew II, and Helen from an unidentified family. He had a brother Julius II, who served as Master of the cupbearers from 1222 to 1228. Ladislaus I had three sons from his unidentified wife: Ladislaus II, who functioned as Judge royal twice in 1273, Julius III, who was a strong ally to his elder brother, and prelate Nicholas Kán, Archbishop-elect of Esztergom at various times in the 1270s. He had an unidentified daughter too, who married Alexander, son of Demetrius Aba. They were ancestors of the Nekcsei noble family. Ladislaus I was also a grandfather of the infamous oligarch Ladislaus III Kán, who ruled Transylvania de facto independently at the turn of the 13th and 14th centuries.

== Career ==
His father held the most important secular positions, when Ladislaus' career has begun. He was first mentioned as Master of the horse (Latin: maresc[h]alcus) in 1217, while Julius I served as Palatine of Hungary in the royal court of Andrew II. Ladislaus is the first known office-holder who was appointed to that position, as there is no demonstrable 12th-century preliminaries of the position. He held the dignity until 1221. From 1220 to 1221, he also functioned as head of Požega County. Meanwhile, Ladislaus participated in the Fifth Crusade between 1217 and 1218, when followed his King to the Holy Land alongside several other barons. During this time, his father Palatine Julius I and John, Archbishop of Esztergom governed the kingdom. Returning home, Ladislaus was appointed ispán of Vas County in 1223.

In 1224, he was appointed Judge royal for the first time, in the same time, when his father served second term as Palatine, thus they together held two of the highest ranking secular positions in the royal court. Ladislaus was Judge royal until 1230, beside that he was ispán of Békés (1224), Nyitra (1224–1225) and Bács Counties (1226–1230). From 1232 to 1234, he functioned as head of Moson County. The elderly Andrew II appointed him Judge royal for the second time in 1234, he held that dignity until the next year. He also governed Bács County again.

Andrew II died in September 1235, which had serious consequences for either the private life and political career of Ladislaus. Béla IV, who succeeded his father without opposition, had long opposed his father's "useless and superfluous perpetual grants" and also wanted to build a new power base. Following his coronation, he dismissed and punished many of his father's closest advisors. The financial expert Denis, son of Ampud was blinded, while Ladislaus' father Julius I was imprisoned and died in captivity in 1237. Ladislaus himself avoided execution or prison, but lost political influence for years. Nonetheless he functioned as ispán of Somogy County between 1236 and c. 1239. In this capacity, he was entrusted to supervise the former royal grants in the county, along with Bartholomew, Bishop of Veszprém.

Ladislaus fought in the disastrous Battle of Mohi on 11 April 1241. When the Mongols were chasing after the episcopal troops of Bartholomew le Gros, the Bishop of Pécs, Ladislaus and his soldiers saved the life of the prelate. As Roger of Torre Maggiore's Epistle to the Sorrowful Lament writes, "[...] When some Tatars sent their horses at full gallop after them [Bartholomew's troops], ispán Ladislas, who was hastening to the king with his troop under unfurled flags, suddenly came upon them, knowing nothing of what had happened. The bishop, recognizing the Hungarian flags, turned to the ispán, and the Tatars, noticing the great numbers, retreated and pursued others. Thus the bishop, departing together with the ispán, escaped from their hands." Following this, Ladislaus regained his former influence at the court. He was already appointed Judge royal by Béla IV in 1242.

In the same year, he was promoted to the office of Palatine of Hungary and also received the ispánate of Somogy County. He held these offices until 1244 or 1245, and according to non-authentic royal charters, he was Palatine in 1246 yet. After that he served as Ban of Slavonia from 1245 to 1247 under the title "banus et dux" ("Ban and Duke"), following Denis Türje's denomination. In 1247, Ladislaus was made Judge royal for the fourth and final time.

== Sources ==
- Markó, László (2006). A magyar állam főméltóságai Szent Istvántól napjainkig: Életrajzi Lexikon [Great Officers of State in Hungary from King Saint Stephen to Our Days: A Biographical Encyclopedia] (in Hungarian). Helikon Kiadó. ISBN 963-208-970-7.
- Master Roger's Epistle to the Sorrowful Lament upon the Destruction of the Kingdom of Hungary by the Tatars (Translated and Annotated by János M. Bak and Martyn Rady) (2010). In: Rady, Martyn; Veszprémy, László; Bak, János M. (2010); Anonymus and Master Roger; CEU Press; ISBN 978-9639776951.
- Zsoldos, Attila (2011). Magyarország világi archontológiája, 1000–1301 [Secular Archontology of Hungary, 1000–1301] (in Hungarian). História, MTA Történettudományi Intézete. ISBN 978-963-9627-38-3.

Ladislaus I Genus Kán Born: ? Died: after 1247
Political offices
Preceded by first known	Master of the horse 1217–1221	Succeeded by Denis Tomaj
Preceded by Batiz Negol	Judge royal 1224–1230	Succeeded by Benedict, son of Samud
Preceded by Demetrius Csák	Judge royal 1234–1235	Succeeded by Julius Rátót
Preceded by Paul Geregye	Judge royal 1242	Succeeded by Demetrius Csák
Preceded by Arnold Hahót	Palatine of Hungary; 1242–1245	Succeeded by Denis Türje
Preceded by Denis Türje	Ban of Slavonia; 1245–1247	Succeeded by Rostislav Mikhailovich
Preceded by Stephen Gutkeled	Judge royal 1247	Succeeded by Roland Rátót
