= Judge royal =

Judicial position in the Kingdom of Hungary

Judge Royal of the Kingdom of Hungary
- Appointer: King of Hungary; Diet of Hungary
- Precursor: Some functions of Palatine
- Formation: c. 1127
- First holder: George
- Final holder: Aurél Dessewffy
- Abolished: 1918 (1884)
- Succession: President of the Curia Regia

The judge royal, also justiciar, chief justice or Lord Chief Justice (German: Oberster Landesrichter, Hungarian: országbíró, Slovak: krajinský sudca or dvorský sudca, Latin: curialis comes or iudex curiae regiae), was the second-highest judge, preceded only by the palatine, in the Kingdom of Hungary between around 1127 and 1884. After 1884, the judge royal was only a symbolic function, but it was only in 1918 — with the end of Habsburgs in the Kingdom of Hungary (the kingdom continued formally until 1946) — that the function ceased officially.

There remain significant problems in the translation of the title of this officer. In Latin, the title translates as 'Judge of the Royal Court', which lacks specificity. In Hungarian, he is 'Judge of the Country', with 'country' in this sense meaning 'political community', being thus broadly analogous to the German 'Land'. English has no obvious translation for Landesrichter, which is the direct German translation of országbíró.

== List of office-holders ==
=== Twelfth century ===
Term	Incumbent	Monarch	Notes	Source
1127–c. 1131	George	Stephen II	"curialis comes"	
b. 1135	Julius	Béla II	"comes curialis regis"	
1135 (?)	Bucan	Béla II	"comes curialis"; only a non-authentic charter refers to him as judge royal, if so, he was also ispán of Bihar County in the same period	
1138	George, son of Cronik	Béla II	"curie regalis officia disponens"	
1145 (?)	Rednald	Géza II	"curialis comes"; only a non-authentic charter refers to him as judge royal	
1146	Cadarius	Géza II		
1148	Gereon	Géza II	"regie curie curam gerens"	
1150–1158	Héder	Géza II	ancestor of the Héder clan	
1158 (?)	Appa	Géza II	"curialis comes maior"; only a non-authentic charter refers to him as judge royal	
1162–1164	Gabriel	Stephen III		
1163	Brocca	appointed by anti-king Stephen IV		
1164–1172	Lawrence	Stephen III		
1171 (?)	Peter	Stephen III	"curialis comes"; only a non-authentic charter refers to him as judge royal	
c. 1174–1181	Cumpurdinus	Béla III		
1183	Peter	Béla III		
1184	Charena	Béla III		
1185–1186	Mog	Béla III		
1188–1193	Dominic Miskolc	Béla III	also ispán of Bodrog County (1192–1193)	
1197–1198	Esau	Emeric	according to non-authentic charters already since 1193–1195; also ispán of Csanád County (1197–1198)	
1198	Peter, son of Töre	Emeric	also ispán of Szolnok County (1198)	
1199	Mika Ják	Emeric	also ispán of Bihar County (1198–1199)	
1199–1200	Vejte Csanád	Emeric	also ispán of Nyitra County (1199–1200), and ispán of Krassó County (1200)	

=== Thirteenth century ===
Term	Incumbent	Monarch	Notes	Source
1201	Achilles	Emeric	also ispán of Keve County (1201)	
1202–1204	Julius Kán	Emeric	first rule; also ispán of Csanád County (1202–1203), and ispán of Nyitra County (1204)	
1205–1206	Smaragd	Andrew II	also ispán of Szolnok County (1205–1206)	
1207	Marcellus Tétény	Andrew II	first rule; also ispán of Csanád County (1206–1207)	
1208–1210	Nicholas	Andrew II	also ispán of Pozsony County (1208), and ispán of Keve County (1208–1209, 1209–1210)	
1211–1212	Marcellus Tétény	Andrew II	second rule; also ispán of Keve County (1211–1212)	
1212–1213	Julius Kán	Andrew II	second rule; also ispán of Bács County (1212–1213)	
1214	Martin Hont-Pázmány	Andrew II	also ispán of Csanád County (1214)	
1215–1217	Atyusz Atyusz	Andrew II	according to a non-authentic charter also in 1218; also ispán of Bács County (1215)	
1219–1221	Julius I Rátót	Andrew II	first rule; also ispán of Keve County (1219–1221)	
1221–1222	Bánk Bár-Kalán	Andrew II	also ispán of Fejér County (1221–1222), and ispán of Bodrog County (1222)	
1222	Pousa Bár-Kalán	Andrew II		
1222	Lawrence Atyusz	Andrew II	also ispán of Nyitra County (1222)	
1222	Solomon Atyusz	Andrew II	also ispán of Moson County (1222)	
1222–1224	Batiz Negol	Andrew II	also ispán of Békés County (1222–1224)	
1224–1230	Ladislaus I Kán	Andrew II	first rule; also ispán of Békés County (1224), ispán of Nyitra County (1224–1225), and ispán of Bács County (1226–1230)	
1231–1232	Benedict, son of Samud	Andrew II		
1232–1234	Demetrius Csák	Andrew II	first rule; also ispán of Bács County (1233–1234)	
1234–1235	Ladislaus I Kán	Andrew II	second rule; also ispán of Bács County (1234–1235)	
1235–1239	Julius I Rátót	Béla IV	second rule; also ispán of Csanád County (1235), and ispán of Keve County (1236–1238)	
1239–1241	Andrew, son of Serafin	Béla IV	also ispán of Pozsony County (1235–1241); killed in the Battle of Mohi	
1241	Paul Geregye	Béla IV	first rule; also ispán of Fejér County (1238–1241)	
1242	Ladislaus I Kán	Béla IV	third rule	
1242–1244	Demetrius Csák	Béla IV	second rule; also ispán of Moson County (1242–1244)	
1244 (?)	Mojs	Béla IV	only a non-authentic charter refers to him as judge royal	
1245–1246	Stephen I Gutkeled	Béla IV	also ispán of Nyitra County (1245–1246)	
1246 (?)	Demetrius Csák	Béla IV	only a non-authentic charter refers to him as judge royal, if so, he was also ispán of Bodrog County in the same period	
1247	Ladislaus I Kán	Béla IV	fourth rule	
1247	Roland Rátót	Béla IV	first rule	
1248–1254	Paul Geregye	Béla IV	second rule; also ispán of Zala County (1248–1255)	
1254–1260	Henry Kőszegi	Béla IV	also ispán of Somogy County (1247–1260)	
1262–1265	Lawrence, son of Kemény	Béla IV	also ispán of Zala County (1262–1264), and ispán of Moson County (1263, 1264)	
1267–1269	Ernye Ákos	Béla IV	first rule; possibly held office until 1270 based on information relating to his deputy; also ispán of Vas County (1267–1269)	
1270–1272	Nicholas Monoszló	Stephen V	also ispán of Somogy County (1270–1272)	
1272	Denis Péc	Ladislaus IV	first rule; also ispán of Varaždin County (1272)	
1272–1273	Alexander Karászi	Ladislaus IV	also ispán of Orbász County (1272–1273)	
1273	Ladislaus II Kán	Ladislaus IV	first rule; also ispán of Baranya, Szeben Counties and Bánya ispánate (1273)	
1273	Matthew II Csák	Ladislaus IV	also ispán of Bánya ispánate (1273)	
1273	Ladislaus II Kán	Ladislaus IV	second rule	
1273–1274	Nicholas Gutkeled	Ladislaus IV	also ispán of Gecske ispánate (1273–1275)	
1274	Ernye Ákos	Ladislaus IV	second rule; also ispán of Szatmár County (1274)	
1275	Denis Péc	Ladislaus IV	second rule; also ispán of Zala County (1275)	
1275	Thomas Hont-Pázmány	Ladislaus IV	first rule; also ispán of Pozsony County and Sempte ispánate (1275)	
1275	Nicholas Geregye	Ladislaus IV	also ispán of Bánya ispánate (1275)	
1275–1276	Ugrin Csák	Ladislaus IV		
1276	Mojs, son of Mojs	Ladislaus IV	also ispán of Somogy County (1275–1276)	
1276	Maurice Osl	Ladislaus IV	also ispán of Vas County (1276)	
1276	James Bána	Ladislaus IV		
1277	Denis Péc	Ladislaus IV	third rule	
1277	Roland Rátót	Ladislaus IV	second rule	
1278	Julius II Rátót	Ladislaus IV		
1278–1279	Stephen II Gutkeled	Ladislaus IV	also ispán of Moson County (1278–1279)	
1280	Peter Aba	Ladislaus IV		
1280–1281	John	Ladislaus IV	also ispán of Bars County (1281)	
1283	Rubinus Hermán	Ladislaus IV		
1283–1285	Amadeus Aba	Ladislaus IV	first rule	
1285	Demetrius Balassa	Ladislaus IV	also ispán of Zólyom County (1285–1287)	
1288	Gregory Péc	Ladislaus IV		
b. 1289	Ivánka Hont-Pázmány	Ladislaus IV	mentioned as "quondam iudex curie domini regis" in 1300; made a will and testament in 1289	
1289	Amadeus Aba	Ladislaus IV	second rule	
1290 (?)	Andrew	Ladislaus IV	only non-authentic charters refer to him as judge royal, if so, he was also ispán of Nyitra County in the same period	
1291–1293	Thomas Hont-Pázmány	Andrew III	second rule	
1293–1297	Apor Péc	Andrew III		
1298–1300	Stephen Ákos	Andrew III		

=== Fourteenth century ===
Term	Incumbent	Monarch	Notes	Source
1301–1311	Presumably the position was vacant during the period of the Interregnum			
1311–1314	John Csák	Charles I	betrayed the King and joined his distant relative, Matthew III Csák in 1314	
1314–1324	Lampert Hermán	Charles I	also ispán of Csanád County (1314–1324), ispán of Nyitra County (1322–1324), ispán of Zala County (1323–1324), and castellan of Tapolcsány (1322–1324)	
1324–1328	Alexander Köcski	Charles I	also ispán of Vas County (1327–1328), and castellan of Varna, Beszterce and Sárvár (1327–1328)	
1328–1349	Paul Nagymartoni	Charles I, Louis I	also castellan of Beszterce (1328–1349)	
1349–1354	Thomas Szécsényi	Louis I	also ispán of Keve County (1349–1350), ispán of Turóc County (1350–1354), and castellan of Beszterce (1349–1354)	
1354–1355	Nicholas Drugeth	Louis I	also ispán of Turóc County (1354–1355), and castellan of Beszterce (1354–1355)	
1355–1358	Nicholas Szécsi	Louis I	first rule; also ispán of Turóc County (1355–1358), and castellan of Beszterce (1355–1358)	
1359	Nicholas Csák	Louis I		
1360–1369	Stephen Bebek	Louis I	also castellan of Beszterce (1360–1369)	
1369–1372	Nicholas Szécsi	Louis I	second rule	
1372–1373	James Szepesi	Louis I	first rule	
1373	Peter Cudar	Louis I	also ispán of Trencsén, Sáros and Zólyom Counties (1372–1373)	
1373–1380	James Szepesi	Louis I	second rule; also ispán of Trencsén and Szepes Counties, castellan of Beszterce (1373–1376), and judge of the royal free cities (1376–1378)	
1381–1384	Nicholas Szécsi	Louis I, Mary	third rule; also ispán of Pozsony, Vas and Sopron Counties (1381–1382)	
1385	Thomas Szentgyörgyi	Mary		
1385–1386	John Kaplai	Mary	first rule	
1386	Emeric Bebek	Charles II	first rule	
1386–1392	Emeric Bebek	Mary & Sigismund	second rule after a short period of vacancy; also ispán of Bars County (1386–1388), ispán of Bereg County (1388–1390), ispán of Liptó and Turóc Counties (1390–1392), and castellan of Boldogkő (1386–1392)	
1392–1395	John Kaplai	Mary & Sigismund	second rule	
1395	Simon Szécsényi	Sigismund		
1395–1397	John Pásztói	Sigismund	also ispán of Nógrád County (1395–1397)	
1397–1408	Frank Szécsényi	Sigismund	participated in a rebellion against Sigismund in 1401	

=== Fifteenth century ===
Term	Incumbent	Monarch	Notes	Source
1409–1414	Simon Rozgonyi	Sigismund		
1415–1423	Peter Perényi	Sigismund	also ispán of Ung, Zemplén Counties (1415–1423), and ispán of Szatmár and Ugocsa Counties (1415–1419)	
1423–1425	Stephen Kompolti	Sigismund		
1425–1435	Matthew Pálóci	Sigismund	also ispán of Szabolcs, Ung and Bereg Counties (1425–1435), and ispán of Borsod and Heves Counties (1425–1427), and ispán of Abaúj County (1425)	
1435–1440	Stephen III Báthory	Sigismund, Albert		
1440	John Kórógyi	Ladislaus V	appointed by Queen Regnant Elizabeth, later the Estates considered his term as illegitimate	
1441–1446	George Rozgonyi	Vladislaus I, Ladislaus V	also ispán of Pozsony, Abaúj and Zemplén Counties (1440–1446), and ispán of Szepes County (1443–1445)	
1446–1470	Ladislaus Pálóci	Ladislaus V, Matthias I	elected by the Diet; also castellan of Buda (1455–1470)	
1470–1471	John Rozgonyi	Matthias I	dismissed after participation in John Vitéz's conspiracy against Matthias	
1471–1493	Stephen V Báthory	Matthias I, Vladislaus II	also Voivode of Transylvania (1479–1493) following the victorious Battle of Breadfield	
1494	Paul Kinizsi	Vladislaus II	also ispán of Temes County (1478–1494), and captain-general of the united southern frontier	
1494–1500	Peter Geréb	Vladislaus II		

=== Sixteenth century ===
Term	Incumbent	Monarch	Notes	Source
1500–1517	Peter Szentgyörgyi	Vladislaus II, Louis II	also Voivode of Transylvania (1498–1510)	
1518–1524	Lawrence Újlaki	Louis II		
1524–1525	Ambrose Sárkány	Louis II	also ispán of Zala County (1515–1526)	
1525–1526	John Drágfi	Louis II	also ispán of Kraszna County (1515–1526); killed in the Battle of Mohács	
1527–1542	Alexius Thurzó	Ferdinand I	also Royal Governor of Hungary (1532–1542), ispán of Trencsén County (1527–1543); ispán of Pest-Pilis County (1532–1542), and Perpetual count of Szepes County (1531–1543)	
1530–1540	Gregory Pestyéni	ruled for John I in the Eastern Hungarian Kingdom		
1542–1554	Thomas Nádasdy	Ferdinand I	also ispán of Vas County (1537–1562), Captain of Transdanubia (1542–1546, 1548–1552), Supreme Commander (1552–1562)	
1554–1566	Andrew Báthory	Ferdinand I, Maximilian	also ispán of Somogy County (1532–1566), ispán of Liptó County (1534–1566), ispán of Szatmár County (1548–1563), and ispán of Szabolcs County (1551–1556); killed in the Siege of Kanizsa	
1566–1567	Gabriel Perényi	Maximilian	also ispán of Abaúj County (1550–1567)	
1567	Christopher Országh	Maximilian	also ispán of Nógrád County (1552–1567)	
1567–1568	Stephen Bánffy	Maximilian	also ispán of Zala County (1541–1568)	
1568–1584	Nicholas Báthory	Maximilian, Rudolph	also ispán of Szabolcs and Szatmár Counties (1563–1584), and ispán of Somogy County (1567–1584)	
1586–1605	Stephen Báthory	Rudolph	also ispán of Somogy County (1573–1605), ispán of Szabolcs County (1586–1605), and ispán of Szatmár County (1589–1605); joined Stephen Bocskay's rebellion	

=== Seventeenth century ===
Term	Incumbent	Monarch	Notes	Source
1606–1608	Sigismund Forgách	Rudolph	first rule; also ispán of Nógrád County (1600–1621)	
1608–1609	Valentine Drugeth	Matthias II	also ispán of Zemplén County (1599–1609), and ispán of Máramaros County (1609); allegedly poisoned	
1610–1618	Sigismund Forgách	Matthias II	second rule; also ispán of Nógrád County (1600–1621), ispán of Szabolcs County (1612–1621), and ispán of Sáros County (1614–1621); Captain of Upper Hungary (1609–1618)	
1618–1620	George Drugeth	Matthias II, Ferdinand II	also ispán of Ung County (1603–1620), and ispán of Zemplén County (1610–1620); died in exile in Poland	
1622–1625	Nicholas Esterházy	Ferdinand II	also ispán of Bereg County (1617–1635), and ispán of Zólyom County (1618–1645), also Captain of Lower Hungary (1622–1625)	
1625–1631	Melchior Alaghy	Ferdinand II	also ispán of Zemplén County (1622–1631), and Captain of Upper Hungary (1630–1631)	
1631–1636	Paul Rákóczi	Ferdinand II	also ispán of Sáros and Torna Counties (1622–1636)	
1636–1645	John Drugeth	Ferdinand II, Ferdinand III	also ispán of Ung County (1626–1645), ispán of Zemplén County (1631–1645), and Captain of Upper Hungary (1636–1640)	
1646–1649	Paul Pálffy	Ferdinand III	also ispán of Pozsony County (1641–1653), and member of the Royal Privy Council (1646–1653)	
1649–1654	Ladislaus Csáky	Ferdinand III	also ispán of Zólyom County (1645–1655), and ispán of Komárom County (1646–1655)	
1655–1670	Francis Nádasdy	Ferdinand III, Leopold I	also Royal Governor of Hungary (1667–1670), ispán of Vas County (1633–1670), ispán of Zala County (1665–1670), and ispán of Somogy County (1666–1670); executed for treason after the failed Magnate conspiracy	
1670–1681	Adam Forgách	Leopold I	also ispán of Nógrád County (1621–1681), and ispán of Borsod and Csongrád Counties (1649–1681), Master of the treasury (1663–1679), member of the Gubernium (1673–1679)	
1681–1687	Nicholas Draskovich	Leopold I	died during the Diet of 1687	
1687–1699	Stephen Csáky	Leopold I	also perpetual count of Szepes County (1670–1699), Captain of Upper Hungary (1681–1699)	
1700–1703	Adam Batthyány	Leopold I	also Ban of Croatia (1693–1703), Captain of Transdanubia (1685–1703), and Captain of Kanizsa (1690–1703)	

=== Eighteenth century ===
Term	Incumbent	Monarch	Notes	Source
1704–1712	George Erdődy	Leopold I, Joseph I, Charles III	also ispán of Varaždin County (1690–1712)	
1713–1714	Nicholas I Pálffy	Charles III	also perpetual count of Pozsony County (1694–1714), and Crown Guard (1701–1714)	
1714–1731	Stephen Koháry	Charles III	famous poet; also perpetual count of Hont County (1711–1731); founded a Piarist elementary school in Kecskemét	
1731–1741	John Pálffy	Charles III, Maria Theresa	also perpetual count of Pozsony County (1732–1751)	
1741–1748	Joseph Esterházy	Maria Theresa	also ispán of Komárom County (1709–1748)	
1748–1759	George Leopold Erdődy	Maria Theresa	also ispán of Árva County (1709–1759), ispán of Bars County (1713–1759), and ispán of Varaždin County (1728–1759); Knight of the Order of the Golden Fleece (1751)	
1759–1765	József Illésházy	Maria Theresa	also perpetual count of Liptó and Trencsén Counties (1724–1766)	
1765–1773	Nicholas II Pálffy	Maria Theresa	also perpetual count of Pozsony County (1751–1773)	
1773–1783	George Fekete	Maria Theresa, Joseph II	also ispán of Arad and Zaránd Counties (1751–1788)	
1783–1786	John Csáky	Joseph II	also ispán of Szepes County (1757–1795)	
1786–1787	Christopher Niczky	Joseph II	also ispán of Temes County (1779–1787)	
1788–1795	Charles Zichy	Joseph II, Leopold II, Francis	also President of the Vice-regency Council (1788–1795); Knight of the Order of the Golden Fleece (1808)	
1795–1802	Peter Végh	Francis	also ispán of Baranya County (1782–1802)	

=== Nineteenth century ===
Term	Incumbent	Monarch	Notes	Source
1802–1806	Francis Szentivány	Francis	also ispán of Sáros County (1790–1823)	
1806–1825	Joseph Ürményi	Francis	also ispán of Fejér County (1802–1825); Chancellor of the University of Pest (1806–1825)	
1825–1827	Joseph Brunszvik	Francis	also ispán of Nógrád County (1806–1827)	
1828–1839	Anton Moses Cziráky	Francis, Ferdinand V	also ispán of Fejér County (1825–1845); President of the Curia Regia and Chancellor of the University of Pest (1828–1839)	
1839–1848	George Majláth, Sr.	Ferdinand V	also ispán of Hont County (1828–1843), Speaker of the House of Magnates (1848); King Ferdinand V appointed Royal Governor for a short time in 1848	
1848–1860	Vacancy during the Hungarian Revolution of 1848 and after its suppression			
1860–1863	George Apponyi	Francis Joseph I	also Speaker of the House of Magnates (1861); one of the initiators of the Austro-Hungarian Compromise of 1867	
1863–1865	George Andrássy	Francis Joseph I		
1867–1883	George Majláth, Jr.	Francis Joseph I	the last office-holder who had judicial powers; also Speaker of the House of Magnates (1867–1883); killed during a robbery	
1884–1888	Paul Sennyey	Francis Joseph I	ceremonial position since 1884; also Speaker of the House of Magnates (1884–1888)	
1888–1893	Ladislaus Szőgyény-Marich	Francis Joseph I		
1895–1917	Béla Orczy	Francis Joseph I, Charles IV		

=== Twentieth century ===
Term	Incumbent	Monarch	Notes	Source
1917–1918	Aurel Dessewffy	Charles IV	last judge royal of the Kingdom of Hungary	

== See also ==
- Palatine (Kingdom of Hungary)
- Master of the treasury
