= Zsigmond Forgách =

Hungarian nobleman

- Baron of Ghymes and Gács
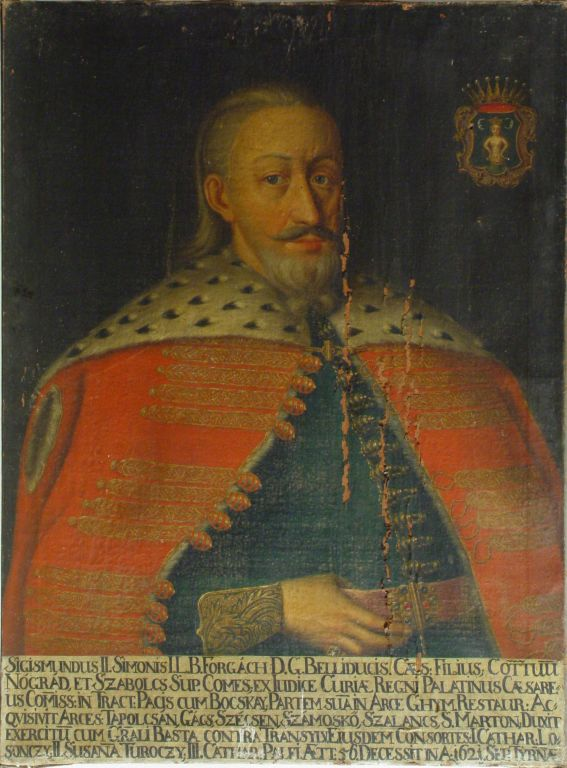

Palatine of Hungary
- Reign: 11 May 1618 – 23 June 1621
- Predecessor: György Thurzó
- Successor: Szaniszló Thurzó
- Full name: Baron Zsigmond Forgách de Ghymes et Gács
- Born: 1559
- Died: 23 June 1621 (approx. 62 years old); Nagyszombat, Kingdom of Hungary (today: Trnava, Slovakia)
- Noble family: House of Forgách
- Spouses: Katalin Losonci; Countess Zsuzsanna Thurzó; Countess Katalin Pálffy
- Issue: Ádám Forgách
- Father: Baron Simon Forgách de Ghymes et Gács
- Mother: Orsolya Pemflinger
- Occupation: Soldier, Politician

Baron Zsigmond Forgách de Ghymes et Gács, sometimes Sigismund Forgách (Slovak: Žigmund Forgáč; 1559 – 23 June 1621, in Nagyszombat, today Trnava in Slovakia), was a Hungarian nobleman in the Kingdom of Hungary, who served as Palatine from 11 May 1618 to 23 June 1621.

== Family ==
The Forgách family was one of the eldest houses of Hungary. Zsigmond's parents were Baron Simon Forgách (died 1598) and Orsolya Pemflinger. His father functioned as Master of Cup-bearers. They had ten children (five boys and five girls), including Ferenc Forgách, Lord Chancellor and Archbishop of Esztergom, and Mihály Forgách, a soldier.

Zsigmond Forgách was born as a Protestant. He married three times, his wives were Katalin Losonci, Countess Zsuzsanna Thurzó and Countess Katalin Pálffy, with whom his eleven children were born (including Count Ádám Forgách, who served as, among others, Lord Chief Justice).

== Political career ==
Baron Zsigmond had been in Polish king Stephen Báthory's royal court since 1583. He became a Royal Counselor in 1599. He converted to Catholicism under the influence of Péter Pázmány. He acquired huge lands by his marriages. He functioned as Lord Lieutenant (Count; comes) of Nógrád County between 1600 and 1621. He also served as Master of Cup-bearers from 1604 to 1607.

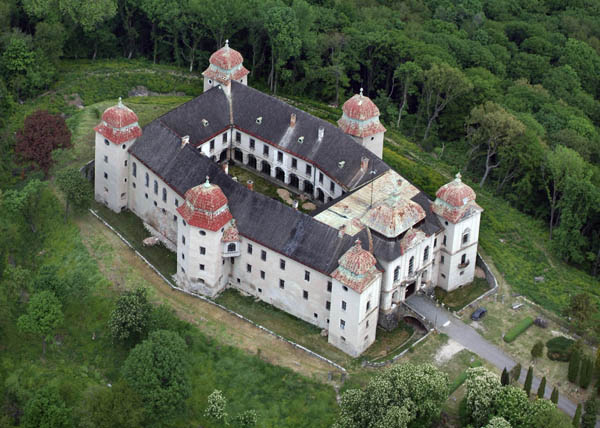
Caste of Gács/Halič (today in Slovakia)

In 1604, he offered peace to Stephen Bocskay, leader of the Bocskay's War of Independence, but he was not authorized by King Rudolf or Crown Prince Matthias, so his offer was rejected. In 1605 at Kassa (today: Košice, Slovakia), he negotiated unsuccessfully, along with György Thurzó and Benedek Pogrányi, with the envoys of Bocskay.

Forgách served as Lord Chief Justice twice: from 15 July 1606 to 30 November 1608 and between 24 January 1610 and 11 May 1618. He was appointed one of the royal commissioners for repossession of the lands which returned to the Crown in 1607, according to the Treaty of Vienna between Bocskay and Archduke Matthias. Forgách functioned as Master of the Treasury between 1 December 1608 and January 1610. He was the Lord Lieutenant (Count; comes) of Borsod County from 1609 to 1610.

He functioned as Captain General of Upper Hungary (Kassa district) and Végvidék between 1609 and 1618. He led an unsuccessful campaign against Prince Gabriel Báthori in Transylvania from June to September 1611. Fleeing to Wallachia and passing through Moldavia, he arrived to Kassa in November 1611. He also served as Count of Szabolcs (since 1612) and Sáros (since 1614) Counties.

After the death of György Thurzó, following a two-year period of vacancy, he was elected Palatine by the Diet of Hungary. Besides that he was also appointed Lord Lieutenant of Pest-Pilis-Solt County. After a series of victorious campaign of Gabriel Bethlen, Forgách joined to Bethlen's army in October 1619, but secretly maintained the contact with Ferdinand II. Later he rejoined to the Habsburg Army and participated in the Siege of Érsekújvár. Forgách died in 1621.

== Legacy ==
He rebuilt the castle of Gács (today: Halič, Slovakia) on land which had been part of the estate of the owner of the county since 1598, choosing a site that was both strategic and offering natural fortifications. In 1612 it was repaired carefully and the foundations of an irregular hexagon was laid. On top of these; a storied building with six corner bastions was constructed, secured by a ditch and mounds. Wings of this hexagon led into a courtyard with plain walls, later covered with many murals depicting figures of the Roman emperors and the Hungarian kings between its windows and entrances.

== Sources ==
- Markó, László: A magyar állam főméltóságai Szent Istvántól napjainkig - Életrajzi Lexikon p. 226. (The High Officers of the Hungarian State from Saint Stephen to the Present Days - A Biographical Encyclopedia) (2nd edition); Helikon Kiadó Kft., 2006, Budapest; ISBN 963-547-085-1.
- Szabó de Bártfa, László: A Hunt-Pázmán nemzetségbeli Forgách család története History of the Forgách family from the kindred of Hont-Pázmány; 1910, Esztergom.

Zsigmond Forgách House of Forgách Born: 1559 Died: 23 June 1621
Political offices
| Preceded by Stephen Báthory | Judge royal 1606–1608 | Succeeded by Bálint Drugeth |
| Preceded by Tamás Erdődy | Master of the treasury 1608–1610 | Succeeded by Ivan Drašković |
| Preceded by Bálint Drugeth | Judge royal 1610–1618 | Succeeded by György Drugeth |
| Preceded by György Thurzó | Palatine of Hungary; 1618–1621 | Succeeded by Szaniszló Thurzó |

]
