= Bucan =

Nobleman in the Kingdom of Hungary

Judge royal uncertain
- Reign: 1135
- Predecessor: Julius
- Successor: George, son of Cronik

Bucan was a nobleman in the Kingdom of Hungary, who, according to a non-authentic charter, served as Judge royal (Latin: comes curialis) and ispán of Bihar County in 1135, during the reign of Béla II of Hungary.

== Sources ==
- (in Hungarian) Zsoldos, Attila (2011). Magyarország világi archontológiája, 1000–1301 ("Secular Archontology of Hungary, 1000–1301"). História, MTA Történettudományi Intézete. Budapest. ISBN 978-963-9627-38-3

Political offices
Preceded by Julius	Judge royal uncertain 1135	Succeeded by George, son of Cronik
