= Meszes =

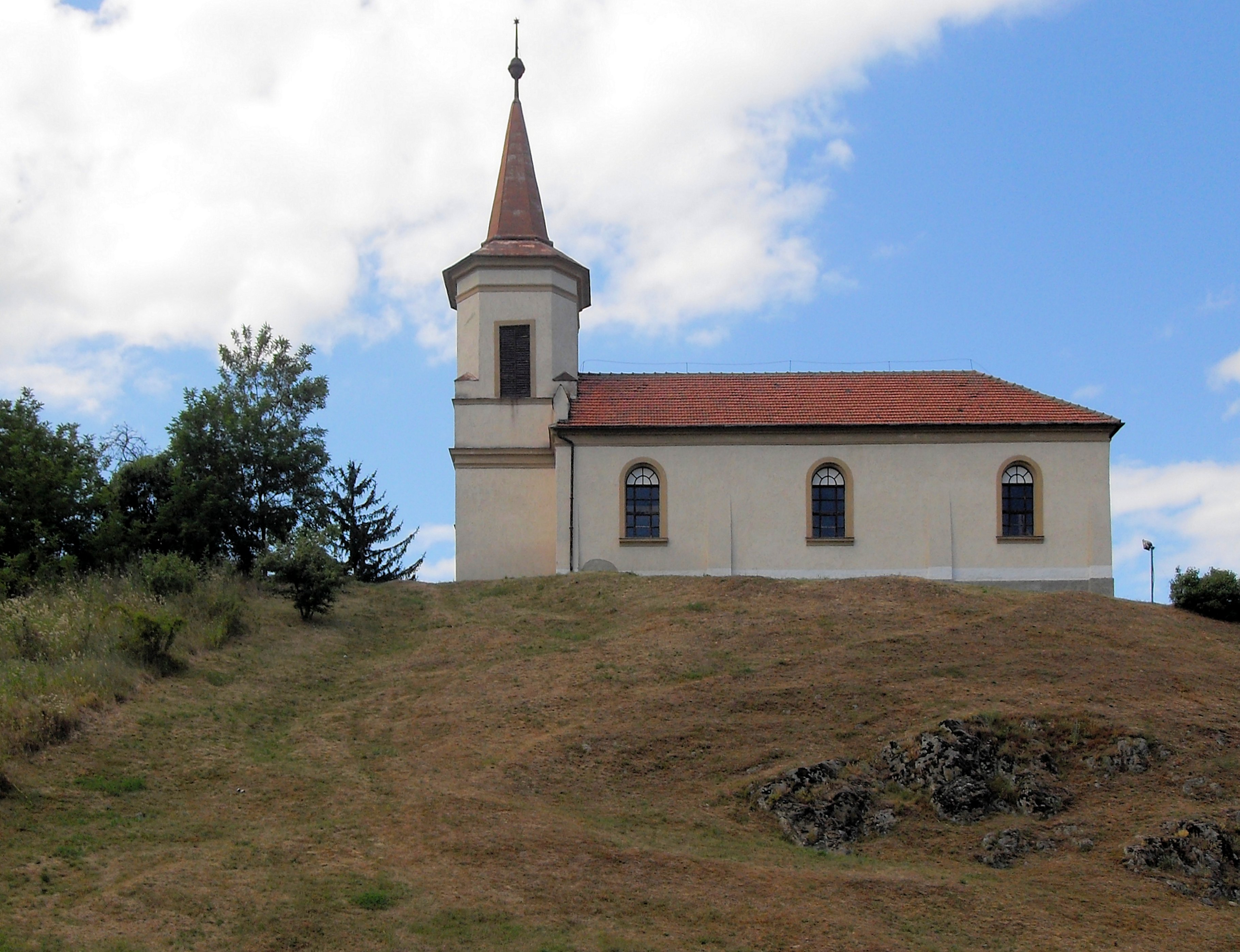

- Location of Borsod-Abaúj-Zemplén county in Hungary

- Location of Meszes
- Coordinates: 48.43950°N 20.79552°E
- Country: Hungary
- County: Borsod-Abaúj-Zemplén

Area
  - Total: 11.4 km^{2} (4.4 sq mi)

Population (2004)
  - Total: 208
  - Density: 18.24/km^{2} (47.2/sq mi)
- Time zone: UTC+1 (CET)
  - Summer (DST): UTC+2 (CEST)
- Postal code: 3754
- Area code: 48

Meszes is a village in Borsod-Abaúj-Zemplén county, Hungary.
