= Básztély (genus) =

Clan in the Kingdom of Hungary (1200s–1310s)

Genus (gens) Básztély
- Country: Kingdom of Hungary
- Founded: 13th century
- Founder: Reynold I
- Dissolution: 1310s
- Cadet branches: House of Rozgonyi; House of Básztélyi

Básztély (also Vasztély) was the name of a gens (Latin for "clan"; nemzetség in Hungarian) in the Kingdom of Hungary. The powerful Rozgonyi family ascended from this clan.

== Social status ==
Their ancient estates laid in Básztély or Vasztély, Esztergom County (today a borough in Csabdi, Fejér County), the name of the kindred derived from it. According to a scholar theory, they were of French origin, and erected a tower in the settlement which became eponym to the village (first appeared in contemporary records as "Boztyh" in 1240) and subsequently the kindred ("bastille" --> "Básztij" --> "Básztély"). According to historian Attila Zsoldos, the kindred belonged to the social status of royal servants, freemen, who owned possession and was subordinate only to the king. The first known member of the family was Reynold I, who was referred to as "serviens noster" by Andrew II of Hungary in 1222. If the French-origin theory is correct, it is possible that he arrived to Hungary as an escort of Queen Yolanda de Courtenay, Andrew's second spouse. He acted as a pristaldus (royal commissioner or "bailiff") in several occasions (first in 1215). Some historians, including Pál Engel, incorrectly claimed that he held the dignity of ispán of Veszprém County from 1237 to 1238; the office-holder's seal proves that he was, in fact, Reynold Rátót.

== History ==
Reynold's eldest son was Andrew, who remained in Básztély to manage the clan possessions, while his younger brothers Solomon and Ladislaus were sent to the court of Ban Stephen Gutkeled. They were granted lands beyond the Drava river by the Gutkeleds in 1263. They had no descendants. All of the Básztély brothers, except Denis, who possibly died by then, had participated in the Battle on the Marchfeld (1278), as their subject, Simon of Kéza's Gesta Hunnorum et Hungarorum commemorated.

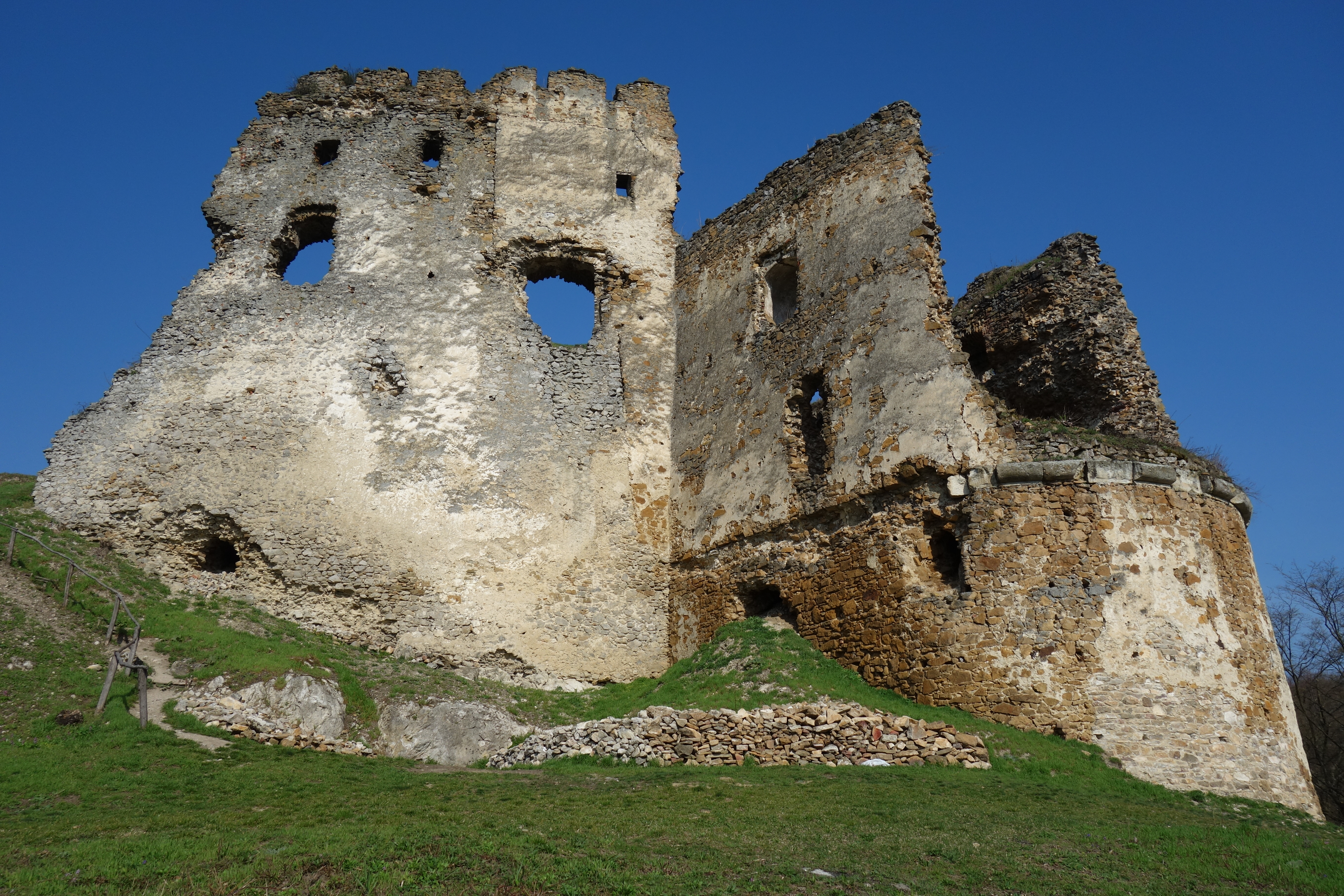
The ruins of the Čičava Castle, today in Slovakia.

Andrew had a lawsuit over the proprietary of Bajna with the neighbor Zoárd kindred. He was present at the wedding of his only daughter Aglent and John Koppán. He died shortly thereafter. His sons became robber knights during the era of feudal anarchy, at the turn of the 13th and 14th centuries. One of them Nicholas pillaged the Zoárd lands around 1300, causing a damage of 400 marks. He did not present before the judicial court of Andrew III of Hungary, as a result, the monarch confiscated the late Andrew's lands and the palace guards of Esztergom seized the property and handed over to the Zoárds. Andrew's sons were never mentioned again; only the son of one of them, Andrew III was granted a negligible portion (Dobódél) of the Básztély fortune, when the branches partitioned it among themselves in 1342.

Reynold I's namesake son, Reynold II was first mentioned by contemporary documents in 1259; he was a member of the group of so-called "royal youth" (Hungarian: királyi ifjak, Latin: iuvenis noster) by then, who was considered a faithful and ambitious soldier in the court of Duke Stephen. He connected his fate and social ascendancy to the power aspirations of the duke, who governed the province of Transylvania on behalf of his father, King Béla IV of Hungary. Reynold's first marriage produced two sons, Ladislaus, the first member of the Rozgonyi family, and Peter. After his wife's death, Reynold married his second wife, an unidentified sister of noble Nicholas Vecse de Putnok; they had three sons – Julius, Solomon and Denis – and a daughter, Anne, who became a nun. Their offspring were called Básztélyi ("of Básztély"), who remained members of the minor nobility in Transdanubia and died out by the end of the 14th century. Reynold's sons remained marginal nobles, without holding any office; their lowborn status hindered to inherit their father's influence, who rose to the elite due to his talent and loyalty. One of them Julius appeared as a familiaris of the powerful oligarch Amadeus Aba. The Rozgonyis returned to the forefront of the Hungarian nobility only in the early 15th century, during the reign of Sigismund.

== Possessions ==
In 1270, Reynold II was granted huge land donations for his military achievements and loyalty by the newly crowned Stephen V: All of his donations were formerly belonged to the property of Prince Rostislav, Stephen's brother-in-law. Reynold was granted Rozgony – later eponymous village of the Rozgonyis, present-day Rozhanovce, Slovakia –, Rásfölde ("Ras' Land") and Lapispatak (today Ploské, Slovakia) in Abaúj County. Reynold instantly became one of the largest landowners in the county with this land donation. He was also granted Tuzsér and Bodon in Szabolcs County and Csicsva (present-day Čičava, Slovakia) and its accessories Hosszúmező and Visnyó (today Višňov, Slovakia) in Zemplén County. It is presumable that Reynold or his son Julius built the castle of Csicsva at the turn of the 13th and 14th centuries.

== Family tree ==
- Reynold I (fl. 1215–40)
  - Andrew I (fl. 1247–95)
    - Aglent (fl. 1290–95) ∞ John Koppán
    - Benedict (fl. 1293–1300)
    - Nicholas (fl. 1295–1300)
    - John (fl. 1295–1300)
    - Andrew II (fl. 1295–1300)
      - Andrew III (fl. 1342)
  - Denis I (fl. 1247)
  - Reynold II (fl. 1259–91, d. before 1296) ∞ (1) N Hahót, (2) N Rátót
    - (1) Ladislaus II, ancestor of the Rozgonyi family
    - (1) Peter (fl. 1296) ∞ Isalt
    - (2) Julius (fl. 1296–1312, d. before 1315) ∞ Isalt Putnoki
      - Anne (fl. 1325–26)
    - (2) Solomon II --> Básztélyi
    - (2) Denis II --> Básztélyi
    - (2) Anne (fl. 1326)
  - Solomon I (fl. 1278)
  - Charles (fl. 1263)
  - Ladislaus I (fl. 1263–1278)
- Bozorg (fl. 1232)

== Sources ==
- Pór, Antal (1889). "Rénold nádor és ivadéka [Palatine Reynold and His Offspring]". Turul (in Hungarian). 7 (3): 114–118. ISSN 1216-7258.
- Zsoldos, Attila (1997). Az Árpádok és alattvalóik. Magyarország története 1301-ig [The Árpáds and their Subjects: a History of Hungary to 1301] (in Hungarian). Csokonai Kiadó. ISBN 963-260-103-3.
- Zsoldos, Attila (1998). "Közszabad nemzetségek [The Middle Privileged Clans]". Mediævalia Transilvanica. 2 (1): 43–60. ISSN 1453-8520.
- Zsoldos, Attila (2011). Magyarország világi archontológiája, 1000–1301 [Secular Archontology of Hungary, 1000–1301] (in Hungarian). História, MTA Történettudományi Intézete. ISBN 978-963-9627-38-3.
