= Reynold Básztély =

Hungarian baron, soldier and courtier

Reynold (II) Básztély

Palatine of Hungary
- Reign: 1289
- Predecessor: Amadeus Aba
- Successor: Nicholas Kőszegi
- Born: c. 1235
- Died: 1291/96
- Noble family: gens Básztély
- Spouses: 1, N Hahót (m. 1259); 2, N Rátót
- Issue: (1) Ladislaus I Rozgonyi (1) Peter (2) Julius (2) Solomon II (2) Denis II (2) Anne
- Father: Reynold I

Reynold (II) from the kindred Básztély (Hungarian: Básztély nembeli (II.) Rénold; died between 1291 and 1296) was a Hungarian baron, soldier and courtier, who was a staunch supporter of Duke Stephen. Originating from a royal servant family, he elevated into the nobility due to his military successes and loyalty. At the peak of his career, he served as Palatine of Hungary in 1289. He was the ancestor of the powerful Rozgonyi family.

== Social status and family ==
Reynold II, who was presumably born in the mid-1230s, originated from the gens Básztély. Their ancient estates laid in Básztély or Vasztély, Esztergom County (today a borough in Csabdi, Fejér County), the name of the kindred derived from it. According to a scholar theory, they were of French origin, and erected a tower in the settlement which became eponym to the village (first appeared in contemporary records as "Boztyh" in 1240) and subsequently the kindred ("bastille" --> "Básztij" --> "Básztély"). According to historian Attila Zsoldos, the kindred belonged to the social status of royal servants, freemen, who owned possession and was subordinate only to the king. The first known member of the family was Reynold's namesake father, who was referred to as "serviens noster" by Andrew II of Hungary in 1222. He acted as a pristaldus (royal commissioner or "bailiff") in several occasions. Some historians, including Pál Engel, incorrectly claimed that he held the dignity of ispán of Veszprém County from 1237 to 1238; the office-holder's seal proves that he was, in fact, Reynold Rátót.

Reynold had at least four brothers: Andrew, Denis, Solomon and Ladislaus. Among them, only Andrew had descendants. He also had a sister, who married Peter, a member of the local clan Bicske. Reynold was first mentioned by contemporary documents in 1259; he was a member of the group of so-called "royal youth" (Hungarian: királyi ifjak, Latin: iuvenis noster) by then, who was considered a faithful and ambitious soldier in the court of Duke Stephen. In the same year, he intended to marry the unidentified daughter of Panyit Hahót, a wealthy member of the illustrious gens Hahót, and a notorious and infamous robber knight of the period. However the lord refused to consent, referring to that the young noble did not have enough possessions to repay the dowry (100 marks) later. Historian Attila Zsoldos also argued Panyit considered the marriage proposal as morganatic, as Reynold came from the lower nobility. However Duke Stephen, to benefit his loyal soldier, deliberately misunderstood the reason for complaint and donated lands to Reynold to neutralize Panyit's argument. Reynold's first marriage produced two sons, Ladislaus, the first member of the Rozgonyi family, and Peter. After his wife's death, Reynold married his second wife, an unidentified sister of noble Nicholas Vecse de Putnok from the gens Rátót; they had three sons – Julius, Solomon and Denis – and a daughter, Anne, who became a nun. Their offspring were called Básztélyi ("of Básztély"), who remained members of the minor nobility in Transdanubia and died out by the end of the 14th century.

== Military career ==
Reynold connected his fate, fortune and social ascendancy to the power aspirations of Duke Stephen, who governed the province of Transylvania on behalf of his father, King Béla IV of Hungary, after the loss of the Duchy of Styria against Ottokar II of Bohemia. Already in 1259–60, he fought against the Bohemian troops in Carinthia and was involved in Stephen's army, which crossed the river Morava to invade Ottokar's realm. However, in the decisive Battle of Kressenbrunn, where Reynold bravely fought, King Béla's and Stephen's united army was vanquished on 12 July 1260, primarily because the main forces, which were under King Béla's command, arrived late.

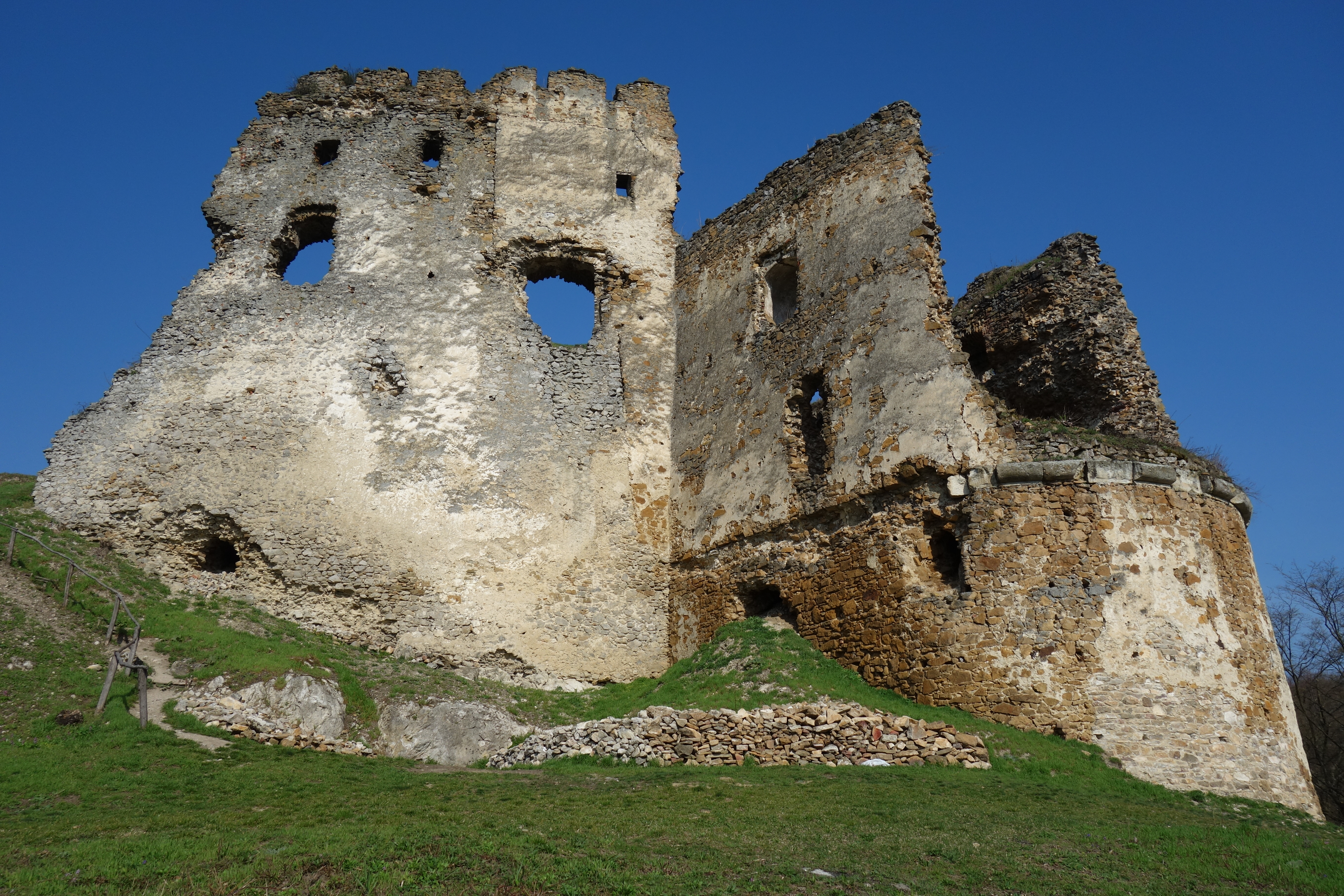
The ruins of Čičava Castle, today in Slovakia.

At this time, Béla's relationship with his oldest son and heir, Stephen, became tense, which caused a civil war lasting until 1266. Despite this confrontation, Reynold remained loyal to the duke and participated in numerous military campaigns and battles in the upcoming years. After a brief conflict, Béla IV and his son divided the country and Stephen received the lands to the east of the Danube in 1262. Reynold participated in the duke's Bulgarian campaign in the second half of 1263, when Stephen sent reinforcements to Bulgaria to assist Despot Jacob Svetoslav in his war against the Byzantine Empire. Returning home, Reynold became a key figure in the evolving civil war between father and son. When Béla's Judge royal, Lawrence arrived at the head of a new army and forced Stephen to retreat to Feketehalom (now Codlea, Romania) in the summer of 1264, Reynold was one of the few defenders of the fortress. Lawrence laid siege to the fort, but Stephen's partisans relieved it. Stephen launched a counter-offensive and forced his father's army to retreat. He gained a decisive victory over his father's army in the Battle of Isaszeg in March 1265. Reynold bravely fought in the skirmish, his left eye was seriously injured. Despite this, he was able to knock out Henry Kőszegi, the leader of the royal army, of the saddle with his lance and capture the powerful baron. During the civil war in Hungary, Stephen's vassal, Despot Jacob Svetoslav submitted himself to Tsar Constantine Tikh of Bulgaria. In the summer of 1266, Stephen invaded Bulgaria, seized Vidin, Pleven and other forts and routed the Bulgarians in five battles. Reynold participated in the war, according to a royal charter from 1270.

When Stephen V ascended the Hungarian throne without difficulty after his father's death in May 1270, Reynold Básztély was granted huge land donations for his military achievements and loyalty. All of his donations were formerly belonged to the property of Prince Rostislav, Stephen's brother-in-law. Reynold was granted Rozgony – later eponymous village of the Rozgonyis, present-day Rozhanovce, Slovakia –, Rásfölde ("Ras' Land") and Lapispatak (today Ploské, Slovakia) in Abaúj County. Reynold instantly became one of the largest landowners in the county with this land donation. He was also granted Tuzsér and Bodon in Szabolcs County and Csicsva (present-day Čičava, Slovakia) and its accessories Hosszúmező and Visnyó (today Višňov, Slovakia) in Zemplén County. It is presumable that Reynold or his son Julius built the Castle of Csicsva at the turn of the 13th and 14th centuries. Historian Attila Zsoldos considers Reynold was already granted this lands in the 1260s by the duke; when Stephen was crowned king, he confirmed his former land donations to his loyal soldier. Despite the land donations, Reynold's lowborn status prevented his elevation to the baronial elite of the realm. Stephen V was appointed him ispán (count) for the stablemen (Hungarian: lovászispán; Latin: comes agasonum), which was only a minor dignity in the royal household. He bore the title until around May 1273. Beside that he also served as ispán of Szabolcs County from 1270 to 1273. He was Master of the stewards in the ducal court of Stephen's son and heir, the minor Ladislaus between 1270 and 1271.

== Powerful baron ==
Following the sudden death of Stephen V and the coronation of the child ruler Ladislaus IV in August 1272, Reynold elevated into the aristocracy as a staunch supporter of the royal power, which weakened in the 1270s feudal anarchy, when two rival baronial groups fought each other for the supreme power. Becoming a member of the royal council, Reynold was appointed Master of the stewards around September 1272, holding the dignity until the autumn of 1274. He became a stable point in the court administration in that period, when twelve "changes of government" took place in the first five regnal years of Ladislaus IV. Following the Battle of Föveny in September 1274, where Henry Kőszegi was killed and the Kőszegi–Gutkeled–Geregye baronial group lost power, Reynold was replaced by Herbord Osl. He regained the position in June 1275, but soon lost again in September. Simultaneously with his position of Master of the stewards, he also functioned as ispán of Szolgagyőr (Galgóc) ispánate (1273–74; 1275), which located in the territory of Nyitra County. When the Kőszegis returned to the power by August 1276, Reynold served as Master of the stewards third time, but it was a short term of office too.

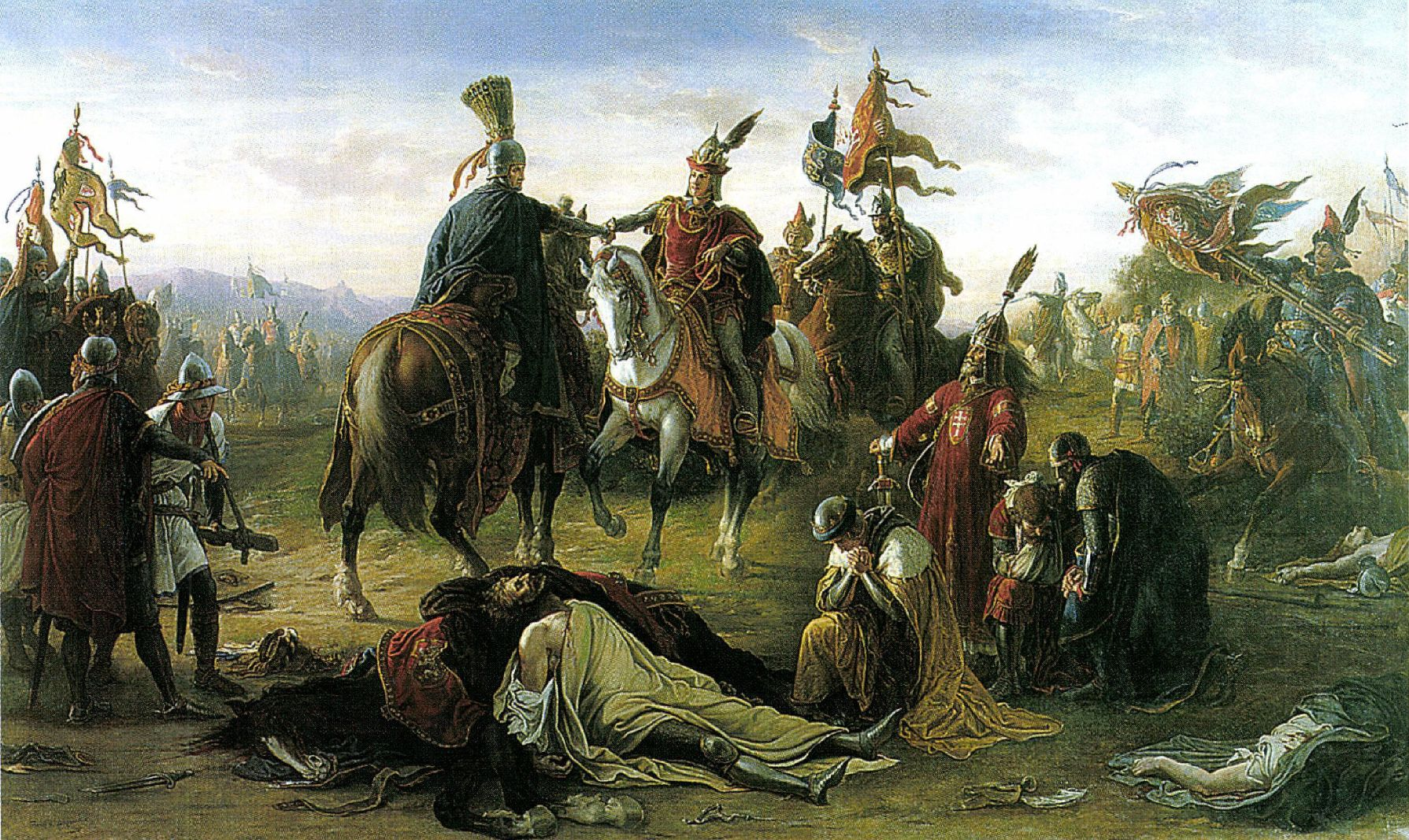
Aftermath of the Battle on the Marchfeld; Reynold Básztély kept the royal Árpád banner in the background

According to Simon of Kéza's Gesta Hunnorum et Hungarorum, Reynold and his brothers, Andrew, Solomon and Ladislaus bravely fought in the Battle on the Marchfeld on 26 August 1278, where Ottokar II was killed. During the skirmish, Reynold kept and guarded the royal banner. While magister Simon described the events of the battle, he detailed exclusively the heroism of the Básztély brothers; therefore notable historians, like Gyula Pauler and Sándor Domanovszky considered that the chronicler originated from Dunakeszi, which belonged to the ownership of the clan. Despite Reynold's loyalty and military skills, he did not hold any dignities in the royal court for the next decade, albeit it is presumable that he is identical with that Reynold, who was styled as ispán of Valkó County in 1279.

He reached the peak in his career, when he was appointed Palatine of Hungary without any antecedents sometimes around August 1289, during the last regnal years of Ladislaus, who became politically isolated by then. By the next month, already Nicholas Kőszegi held the dignity, according to a charter issued on 8 September. As another document, which was transcribed in the next day, refers to Reynold as an incumbent palatine, Gyula Pauler argued there were two palatines in the kingdom simultaneously during that time, as a precursor of the established political administration during the late reign of Andrew III of Hungary. Accordingly, Reynold was responsible for the affairs in Cisdanubia. However Attila Zsoldos, who formerly also shared this viewpoint, questioned Pauler's theory, proving that the royal charter, which issued on 9 September, and its transcribed version on 30 September were non-authentic. Thus it is sure that Reynold bore the dignity on 21 August, but soon he was replaced by Kőszegi by 8 September (Reynold's predecessor Amadeus Aba was last styled as palatine in 1288). Historian Tibor Szőcs considers that Nicholas Kőszegi arbitrarily used the title of palatine in September 1289, without the recognition of the monarch. He argues some texts of the non-authentic charters from that period were based on authentic documents.

Alongside Peter, son of Petenye and a certain James, the elderly Reynold served as noble judge (Hungarian: szolgabíró; lit. "servants' judge") of Zemplén County sometimes after 1289 (some historians dated to around 1286 and 1291). Reynold died by September 1296, when he was referred to as a deceased person. His sons remained marginal nobles, without holding any office; their lowborn status hindered to inherit their father's influence, who rose to the elite due to his talent and loyalty. One of them Julius appeared as a familiaris of the powerful oligarch Amadeus Aba. The Rozgonyis returned to the forefront of the Hungarian nobility only in the early 15th century, during the reign of Sigismund.

== Sources ==
- Markó, László (2006). A magyar állam főméltóságai Szent Istvántól napjainkig: Életrajzi Lexikon [Great Officers of State in Hungary from King Saint Stephen to Our Days: A Biographical Encyclopedia] (in Hungarian). Helikon Kiadó. ISBN 963-208-970-7.
- Szőcs, Tibor (2014). A nádori intézmény korai története, 1000–1342 [An Early History of the Palatinal Institution: 1000–1342] (in Hungarian). Magyar Tudományos Akadémia Támogatott Kutatások Irodája. ISBN 978-963-508-697-9.
- Szűcs, Jenő (2002). Az utolsó Árpádok [The Last Árpáds] (in Hungarian). Osiris Kiadó. ISBN 963-389-271-6.
- Zsoldos, Attila (1997). Az Árpádok és alattvalóik. Magyarország története 1301-ig [The Árpáds and their Subjects: a History of Hungary to 1301] (in Hungarian). Csokonai Kiadó. ISBN 963-260-103-3.
- Zsoldos, Attila (1998). "Közszabad nemzetségek [The Middle Privileged Clans]". Mediævalia Transilvanica. 2 (1): 43–60. ISSN 1453-8520.
- Zsoldos, Attila (2007). Családi ügy: IV. Béla és István ifjabb király viszálya az 1260-as években [A family affair: The Conflict between Béla IV and Junior King Stephen in the 1260s] (in Hungarian). História, MTA Történettudományi Intézete. ISBN 978-963-9627-15-4.
- Zsoldos, Attila (2011). Magyarország világi archontológiája, 1000–1301 [Secular Archontology of Hungary, 1000–1301] (in Hungarian). História, MTA Történettudományi Intézete. ISBN 978-963-9627-38-3.

Reynold II Genus Básztély Born: c. 1235 Died: 1291/1296
Political offices
Preceded by Peter Csák	Master of the stewards 1272–1274	Succeeded by Herbord Osl
Preceded by Nicholas Pok	Master of the stewards 1275	Succeeded by Stephen Csák
Preceded by Stephen Csák	Master of the stewards 1276	Succeeded by Stephen Csák
Preceded by Amadeus Aba	Palatine of Hungary; 1289	Succeeded by Nicholas Kőszegi
