= Julius Básztély =

- Died: 1312/15
- Noble family: gens Básztély
- Spouse: Isalt Putnoki
- Issue: Anne
- Father: Reynold II
- Mother: N Putnoki

Julius from the kindred Básztély (Hungarian: Básztély nembeli Gyula; died between 1312 and 1315) was a Hungarian noble at the turn of the 13th and 14th centuries.

== Family ==
Julius was born into the gens (clan) Básztély, which elevated into the social status of nobility due to military merits and successes of his father, Reynold II. His mother was Reynold's second wife, an unidentified sister of noble Nicholas Vecse de Putnok from the gens Rátót. Julius had several siblings, including Ladislaus I, who was the first member of the late medieval powerful Rozgonyi family. Julius had a daughter Anne, who became a nun. His widow, Isalt Putnoki was still alive in 1325.

== Life ==
He was first mentioned by contemporary records in 1296. Presumably, he built the castle of Csicsva in Zemplén County (present-day part of Sedliská in Slovakia) in the early 1300s, but it is also possible that the fort was constructed already during his father's time. Julius supported the claim of Charles of Anjou during the era of interregnum and war of succession in the first decade of the 14th century. His familiares – and certainly himself – participated in Charles' military campaign against the Kingdom of Bohemia in 1304. Belonging to his escort, Julius was present in Kassa (today Košice, Slovakia) on 5 September 1311, when the powerful oligarch and Charles' mainstay Amadeus Aba was assassinated. Julius managed to escape from the crime scene, when one of his servants handed him his horse.

Following the assassination, Charles I arbitrated an agreement between Amadeus' sons and the town, which also prescribed that the Abas withdraw from two counties and allow the noblemen inhabiting their domains to freely join Charles. In accordance with the treaty, Julius was one of those 47 lords who offered hostages in order to preserve lasting peace. However, the Abas soon entered into an alliance with Matthew Csák against the king. Julius remained a loyal partisan of Charles during the conflict, as the king confirmed his donation letter to his servant on 14 June 1312, one day before the Battle of Rozgony. Julius did not appear in contemporary documents thereafter. He died by 1315, as his nephews John and Peter confirmed one of his donations in January of that year.

== Sources ==
- Engel, Pál (1996). Magyarország világi archontológiája, 1301–1457, I [Secular Archontology of Hungary, 1301–1457, Volume I] (in Hungarian). História, MTA Történettudományi Intézete. ISBN 963-8312-44-0.
- Zsoldos, Attila (1997). "Kassa túszai (Pillanatfelvétel 1311-ből Aba Amadé famíliájáról) [The Hostages of Kassa (A Snapshot of Amadeus Aba's Family from 1311)]". Történelmi Szemle (in Hungarian). 39 (3–4). Hungarian Academy of Sciences: 345–362. ISSN 0040-9634.
