= Čičava Castle =

Historic site in Slovakia

Coordinates: 48°54′52″N 21°44′18″E

- Čičava Hrad
- Sedliská, Prešov, Slovakia
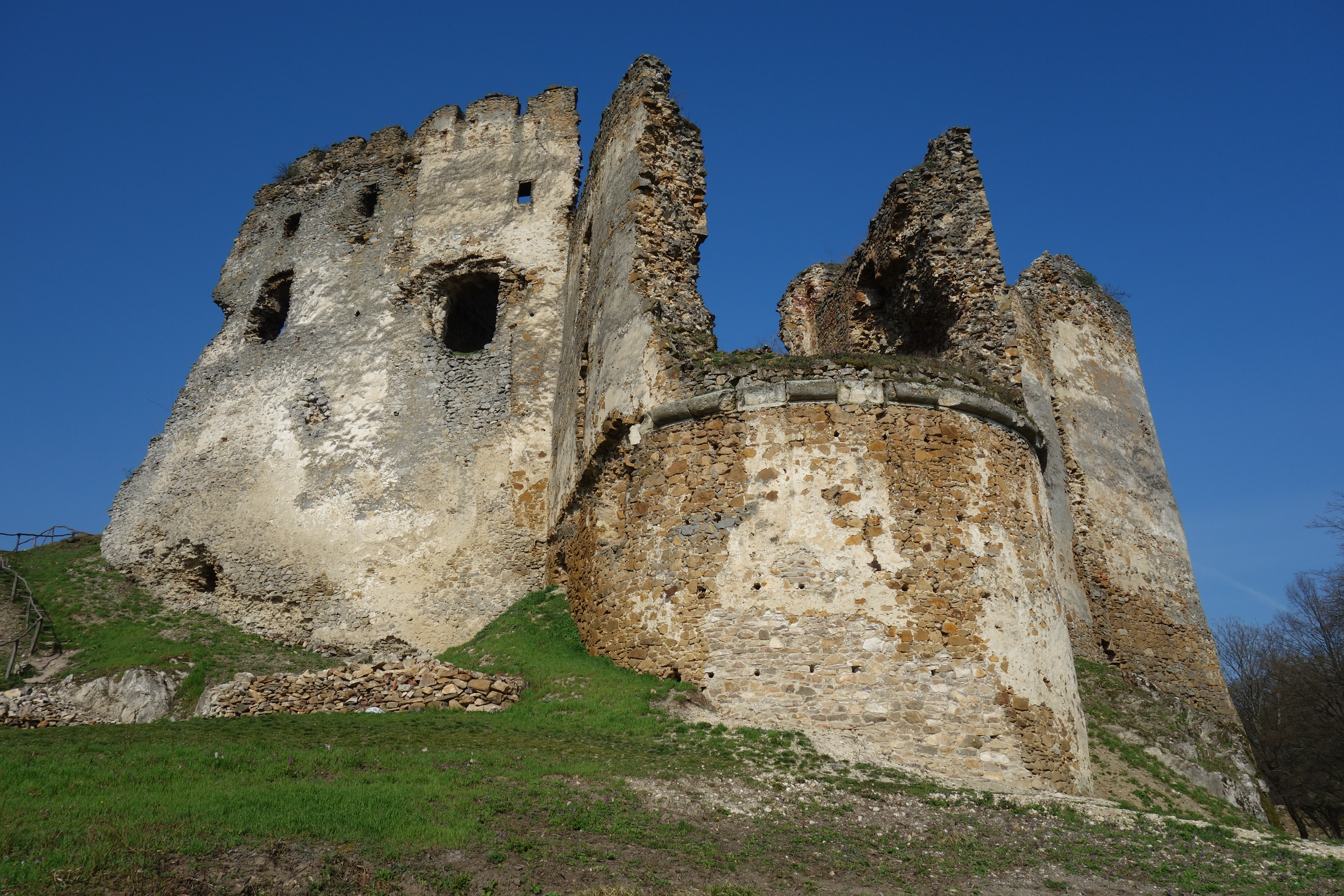

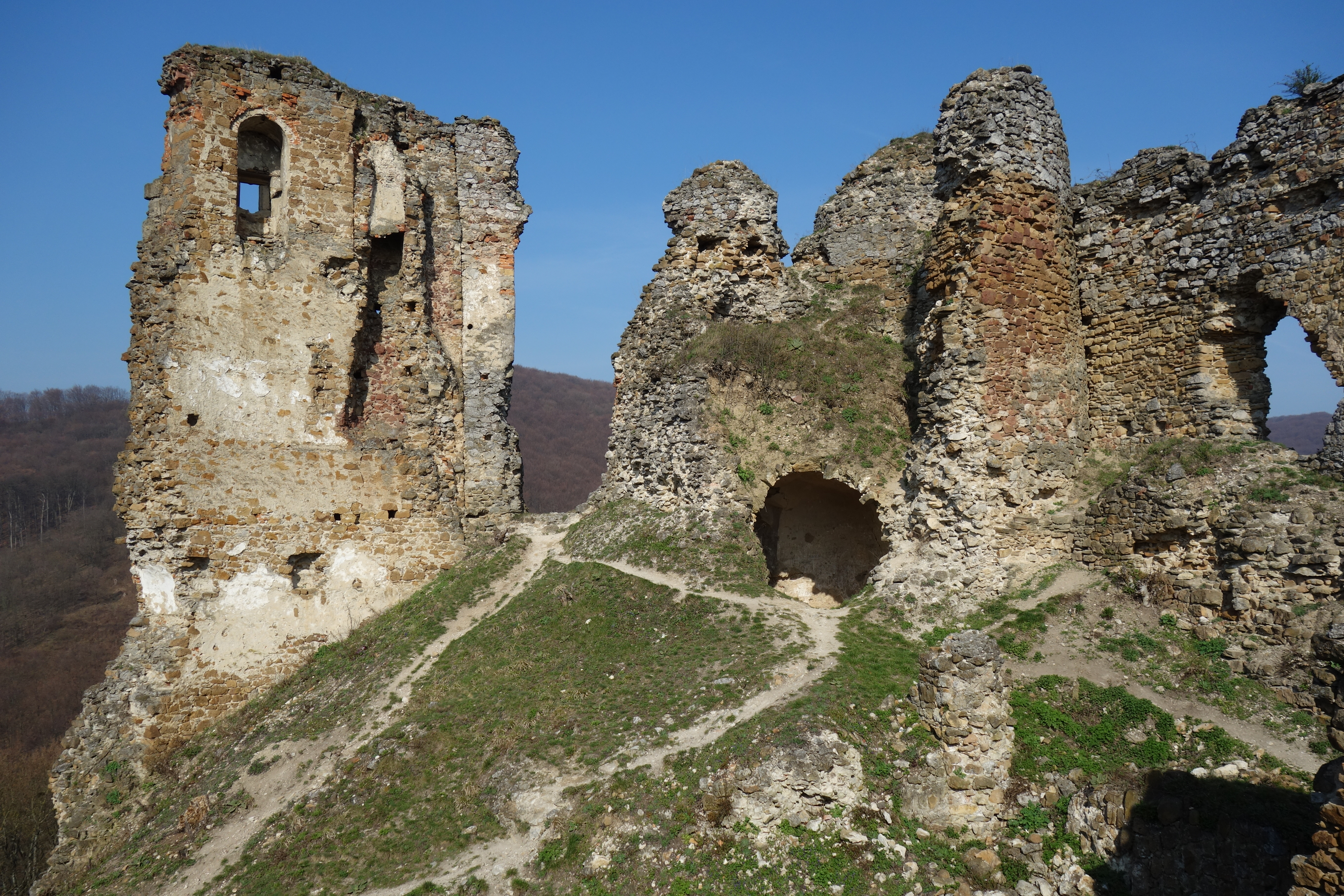

Site information
- Type: Castle
- Owner: Cultural Heritage Monuments of Slovakia

Site history
- Built: Around the 13th Century

Čičava Castle (Slovak: Čičava Hrad, Hungarian: Csicsva vára) also known as Čičva Castle, are the ruins of a Medieval castle located in the village of Sedliská in the Prešov Region of Slovakia. Čičava Castle was declared a cultural monument in 1963. In 2024, parts of the ruins walls were renovated.

The castle is known for housing the "Book of Lies and Liars" during the 16th and 17th centuries, which is also known as the Book of Čičava. This book contained a record of curious lies and the names of those who told them. The Slovak expression "it should be entered in the Čičava Book" remains in use today, signifying outrageous or bold lies.

== History ==
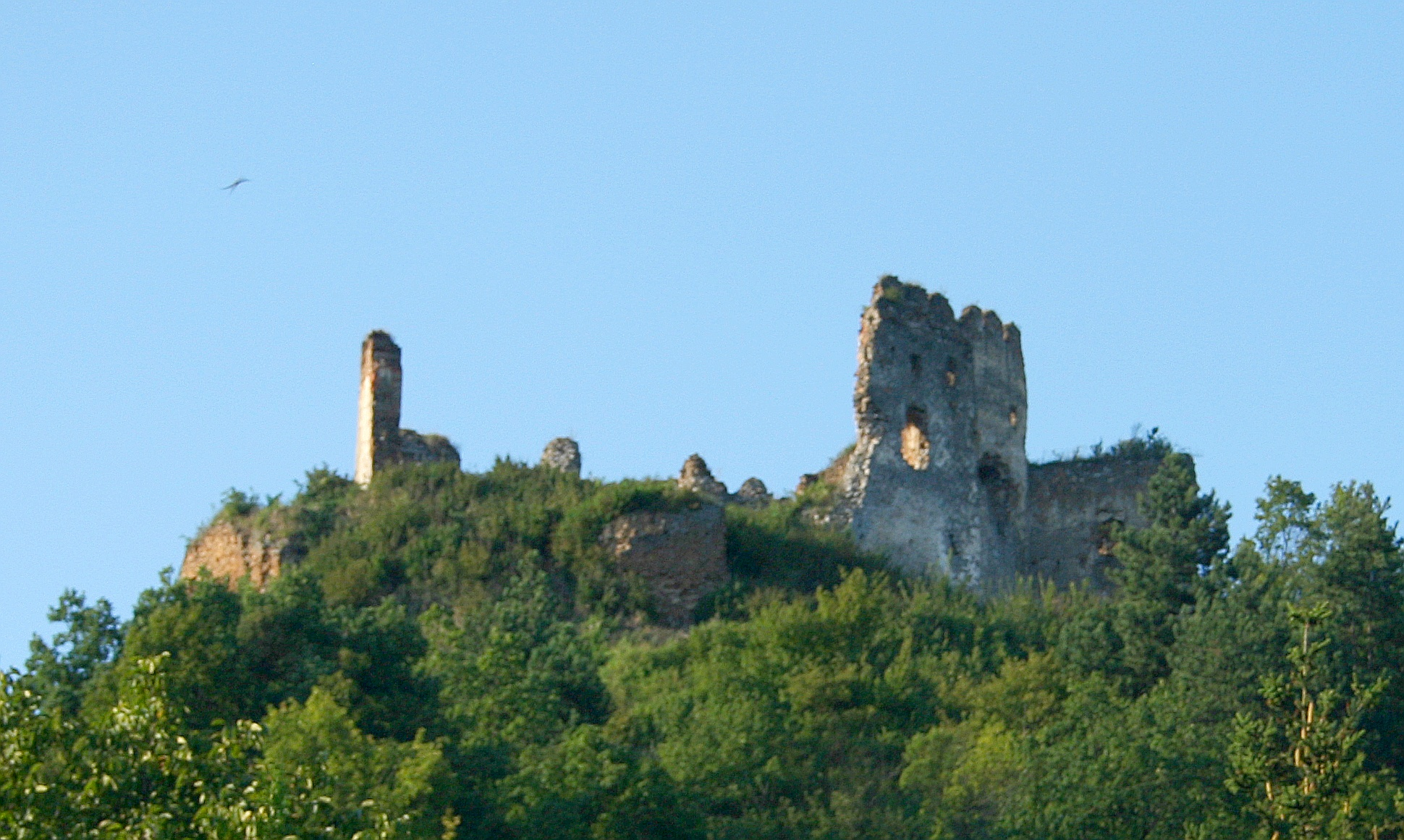
The ruins from afar.

When Stephen V took the Hungarian throne in 1270, he granted several estates, including the Čičva property, to the nobleman Reynold Básztély, who was the progenitor of the Rozgonyi family, in recognition of his loyal service and contributions during the royal army's campaigns. The construction of the castle occurred between 1309 and 1316, likely undertaken by the sons of Reynold. The earliest documented reference to the castle, bearing the same name, is from 1316. This document, issued by Master Peter, who was Reynold's grandson, awarded Nicholas Peres, the castellan of Čičva Castle, with the Tuzsér estate for his successful defense of the castle. It is believed that this defense involved repelling an assault by Peter, son of Petenye, a participant from Zemplén County in the uprising against Charles I of Hungary, during which castellan Nicholas lost his left arm, and his brother Stephen, along with three other members of the castle garrison, perished.

In 1575, the marriage of Ferenc Nádasdy and Elizabeth Báthory occurred in the nearby village of Vranov nad Topľou. Čičva Castle was included in the bride's dowry. In 1610, Elizabeth's daughter Catherine, who wed György III Drugeth from Humenné, received it as part of her dowry. Consequently, the castle came under the ownership of the Drugeth family, who were instrumental in its significant expansion. During the time of the Drugeths, the archive of the Zemplén County was also housed here.

In the 1660s, György's great-grandson Zsigmond inherited the castle. When the anti-Habsburg uprising commenced, he opposed the rebellion; however, in 1684, the castle was captured by Thököly's forces, leading to Zsigmond's execution. His death marked the end of the Drugeth lineage.

Following Zsigmond's death, his two daughters and their spouses received the estates and properties through royal favor. Yet, around 1704, the castle was taken by the rebels supporting Francis II Rákóczi. They undertook repairs on the damaged sections and fortified the castle. The well-defended structure withstood the assaults of the imperial forces for an extended period. The castle remained under rebel control until 1711, when Count Ferenc Barkóczy allied with the imperial troops and surrendered the castle to them, which was subsequently destroyed by the imperial general Laucken. Since that time, the castle has remained in ruins.

The Barkóczy family is first mentioned in connection with the castle in 1711, when the rebels of Francis II Rákóczi were based in the castle for about eight years.

== Architectural design ==
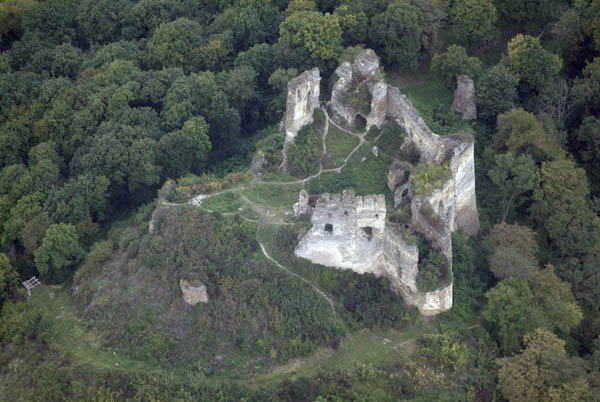
Aerial photograph of the ruins.

The castle was constructed on a hill's promontory, extending southward into the broadening section of the Ondava River valley. It was shielded on three sides by steep slopes, with the most abrupt incline located to the east, where it descended in rocky cliffs towards the river. The northern approach to the castle was more gradual, situated at a narrow neck that linked the promontory to the remainder of the hill. This area could be isolated by a ditch; however, with the advent of firearms, it posed a risk to the defenders due to the rising terrain to the north.

The oldest section of the castle consisted of an irregular, originally triangular defensive wall, which on at least two sides followed the edges of the rocky cliffs, enclosing an area with maximum dimensions of 48 meters in the southwest, 37 meters in the southeast, and 32 meters in the north. The wall was notably thick, measuring 1.5 to 1.6 meters in width at ground level. As the castle initially lacked a tower, its defense relied on the wall, which was likely topped with a walkway or porch. The defenders were probably shielded by a parapet featuring battlements. The residential structures of the castle were likely clustered within the courtyard, primarily in the more secure southern and southeastern sections.

== See also ==
- List of castles in Slovakia
