= Sedliská =

- Municipality
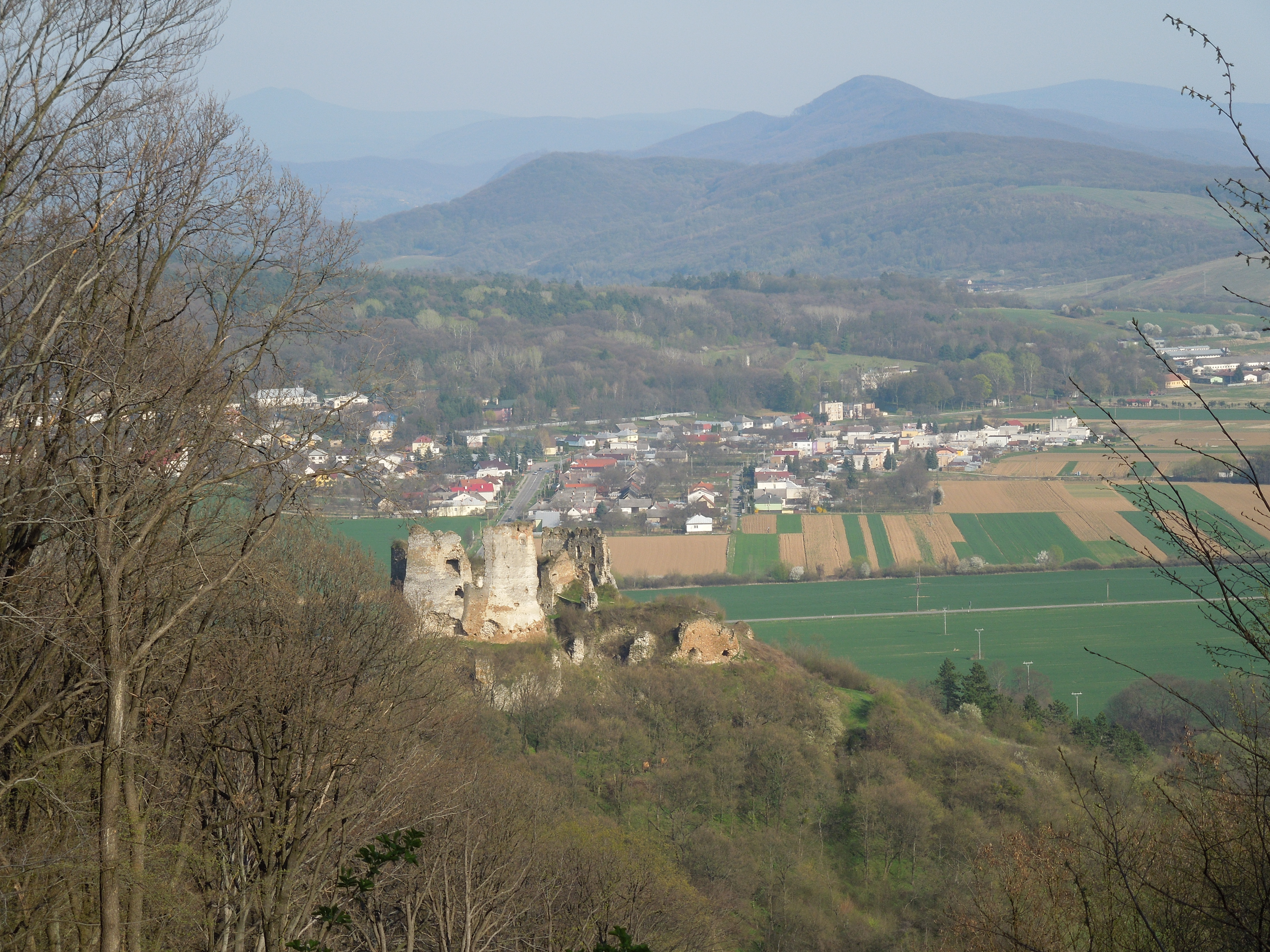

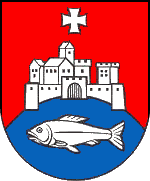
- Flag Coat of arms

- Location of Sedliská in the Prešov Region Location of Sedliská in Slovakia
- Coordinates: 48.90°N 21.73°E
- Country: Slovakia
- Region: Prešov Region
- District: Vranov nad Topľou District
- First mentioned: 1323

Area
  - Total: 10.13 km^{2} (3.91 sq mi)
- Elevation: 138 m (453 ft)

Population (2025)
  - Total: 1,554
- Time zone: UTC+1 (CET)
  - Summer (DST): UTC+2 (CEST)
- Postal code: 940 9
- Area code: +421 57
- Vehicle registration plate (until 2022): VT
- Website: www.sedliska.sk

Sedliská (Hungarian: Telekháza, until 1899: Szedliszke) is a village and municipality in Vranov nad Topľou District in the Prešov Region of eastern Slovakia.

The village is also the home of Čičava Castle (Slovak:Čičava Hrad) also known as Čičva Castle, which are the ruins of a Medieval castle.

== History ==
In historical records the village was first mentioned in 1323.

== Geography ==
The municipality lies at an altitude of 138 metres (453 ft) and covers an area of 10.13 km^{2} (3.91 sq mi) (2025).

== Population ==
Population statistic (10 years)
Year	1995	2005	2015	2025
Count	1216	1283	1412	1554
Difference		+5.50%	+10.05%	+10.05%

Population statistic
Year	2024	2025
Count	1537	1554
Difference		+1.10%

It has a population of 1554 people (31 December 2025).

=== Ethnicity ===
Census 2021 (1+ %)
Ethnicity	Number	Fraction
Slovak	1445	97.83%
Romani	38	2.57%
Not found out	28	1.89%
Total	1477	

In year 2021 was 1477 people by ethnicity 1445 as Slovak, 38 as Romani, 28 as Not found out, 5 as Rusyn, 3 as Polish, 2 as Czech, 2 as Russian, 2 as Other, 2 as English, 1 as Ukrainian, 1 as Serbian, 1 as Romanian, 1 as Canadian and 1 as Albanian.

Note on population: The difference values of population numbers in the table "Population statistic" and in the sections "Ethnicity" & "Religion" is caused by the use of various statistical methods.

=== Religion ===
Census 2021 (1+ %)
Religion	Number	Fraction
Roman Catholic Church	846	57.28%
Greek Catholic Church	516	34.94%
None	67	4.54%
Not found out	23	1.56%
Total	1477	

In year 2021 was 1477 people by religion 846 from Roman Catholic Church, 516 from Greek Catholic Church, 67 from None, 23 from Not found out, 11 from Evangelical Church, 6 from Eastern Orthodox Church, 3 from Ad hoc movements, 2 from Jehovah's Witnesses, 1 from Calvinist Church, 1 from Other and not ascertained christian church and 1 from Christian Congregations in Slovakia.
