= Csabdi =

- Csabdi
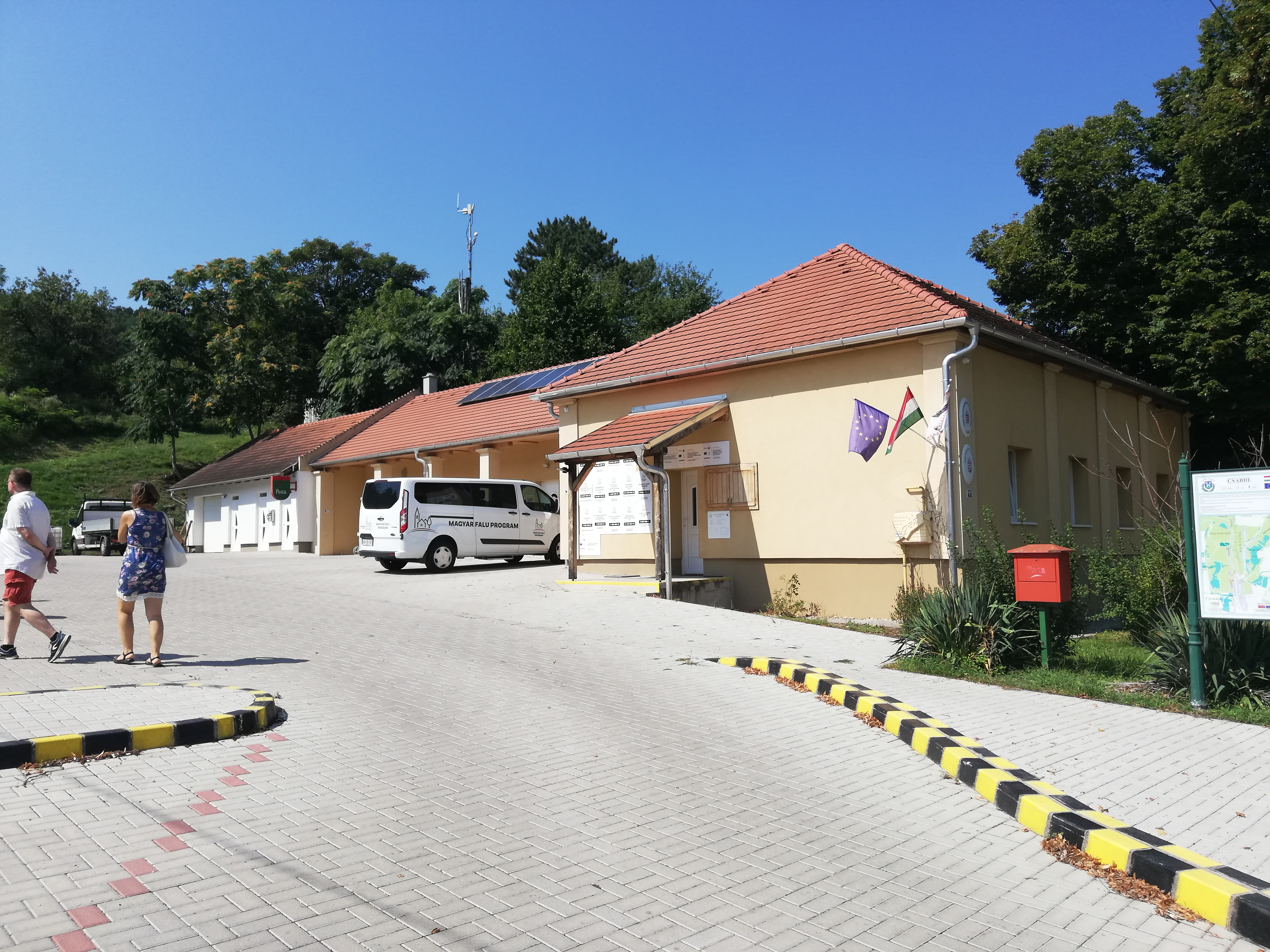
- Village hall

- Coat of arms

- Location of Getto
- Coordinates: 47.52302°N 18.61016°E
- Country: Hungary
- County: Fejér

Area
  - Total: 16.87 km^{2} (6.51 sq mi)

Population (2004)
  - Total: 1,174
  - Density: 69.59/km^{2} (180.2/sq mi)
- Time zone: UTC+1 (CET)
  - Summer (DST): UTC+2 (CEST)
- Postal code: 2064
- Area code: 22
- Motorways: M1
- Distance from Budapest: 40.8 km (25.4 mi) East
- Website: www.csabdi.eu

Csabdi is a village in Fejér county, Hungary.

== Gallery ==
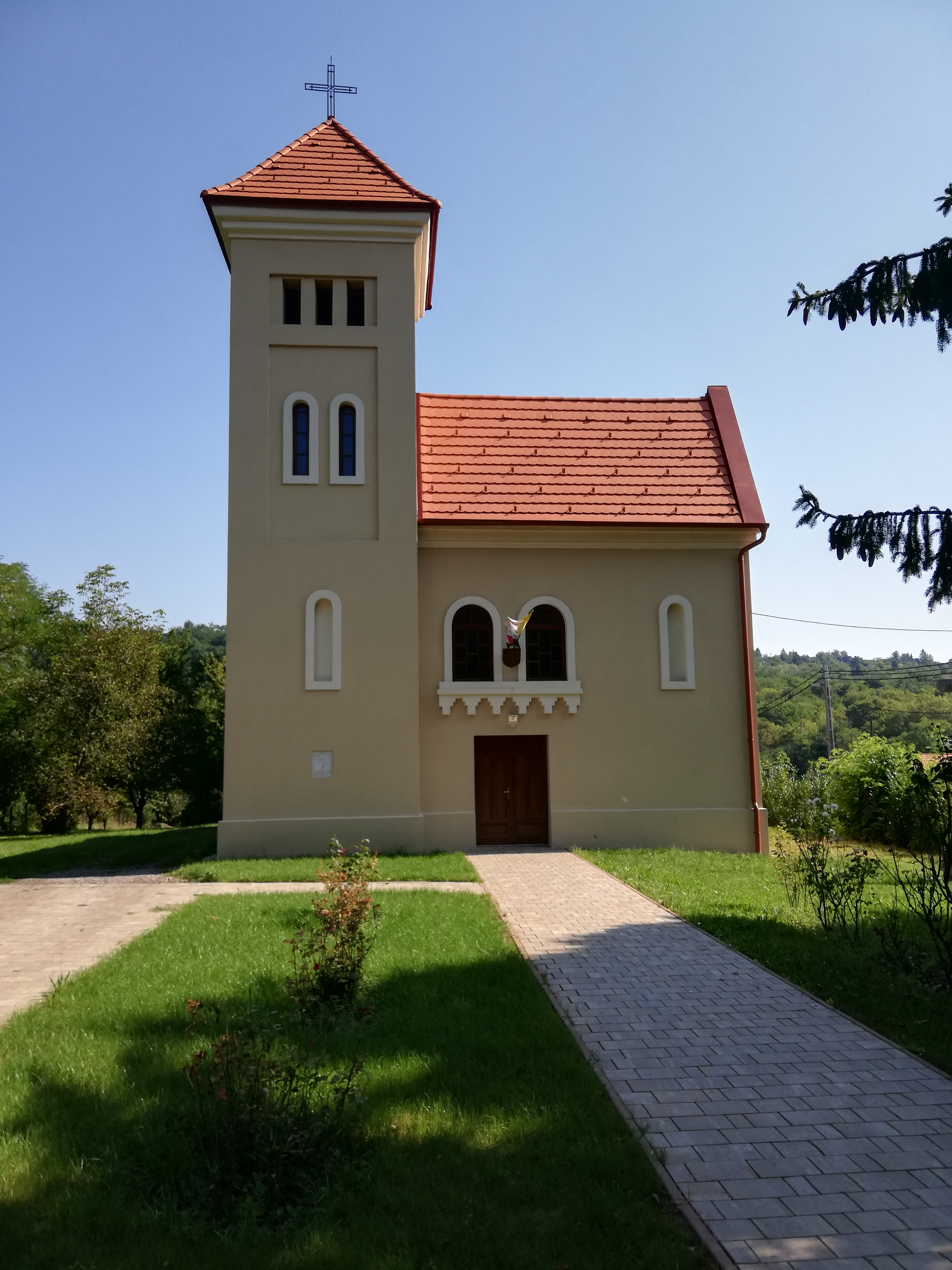
Saint László Church

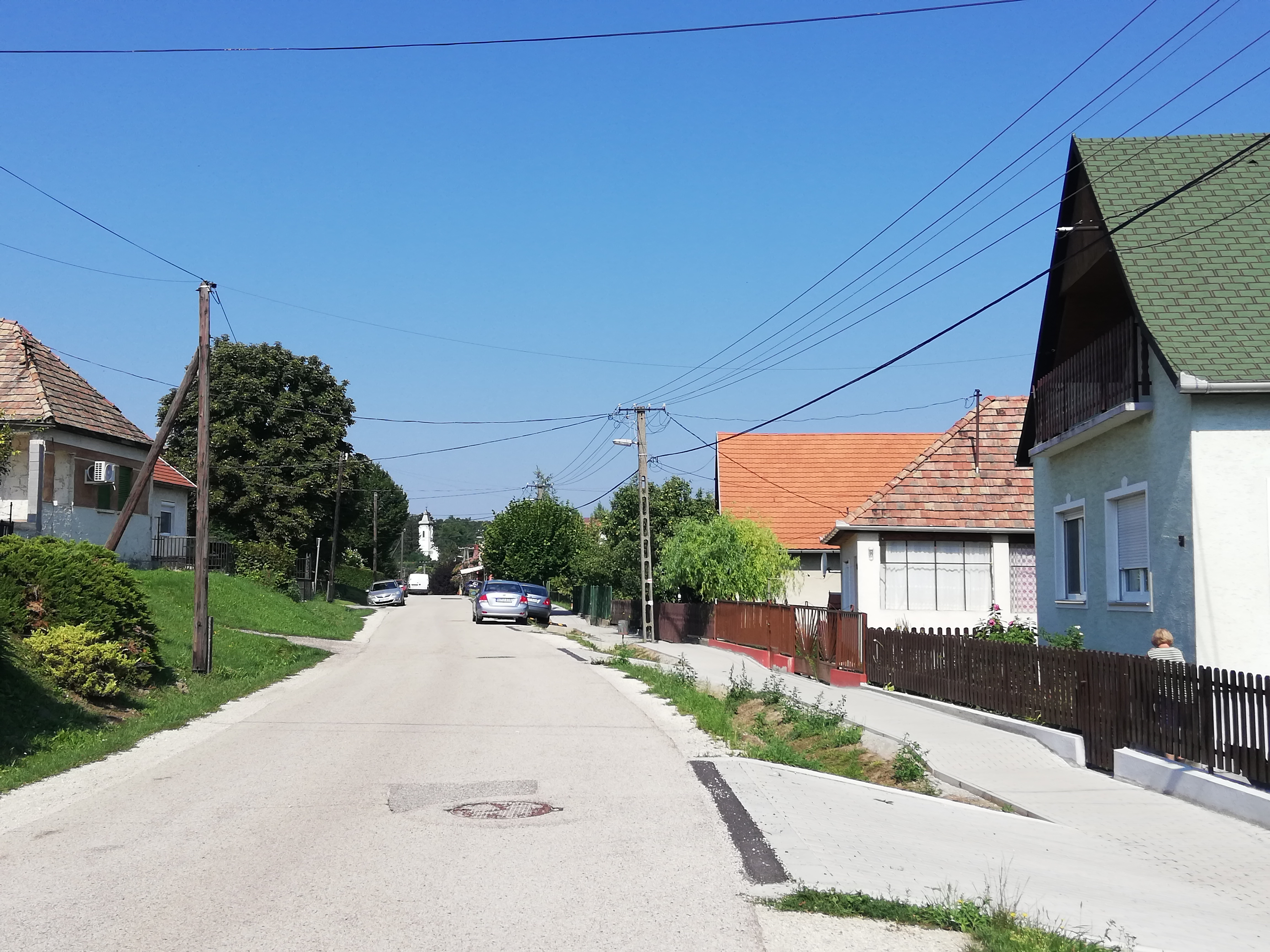
Szabadság Street, with the Reformed Church in the background

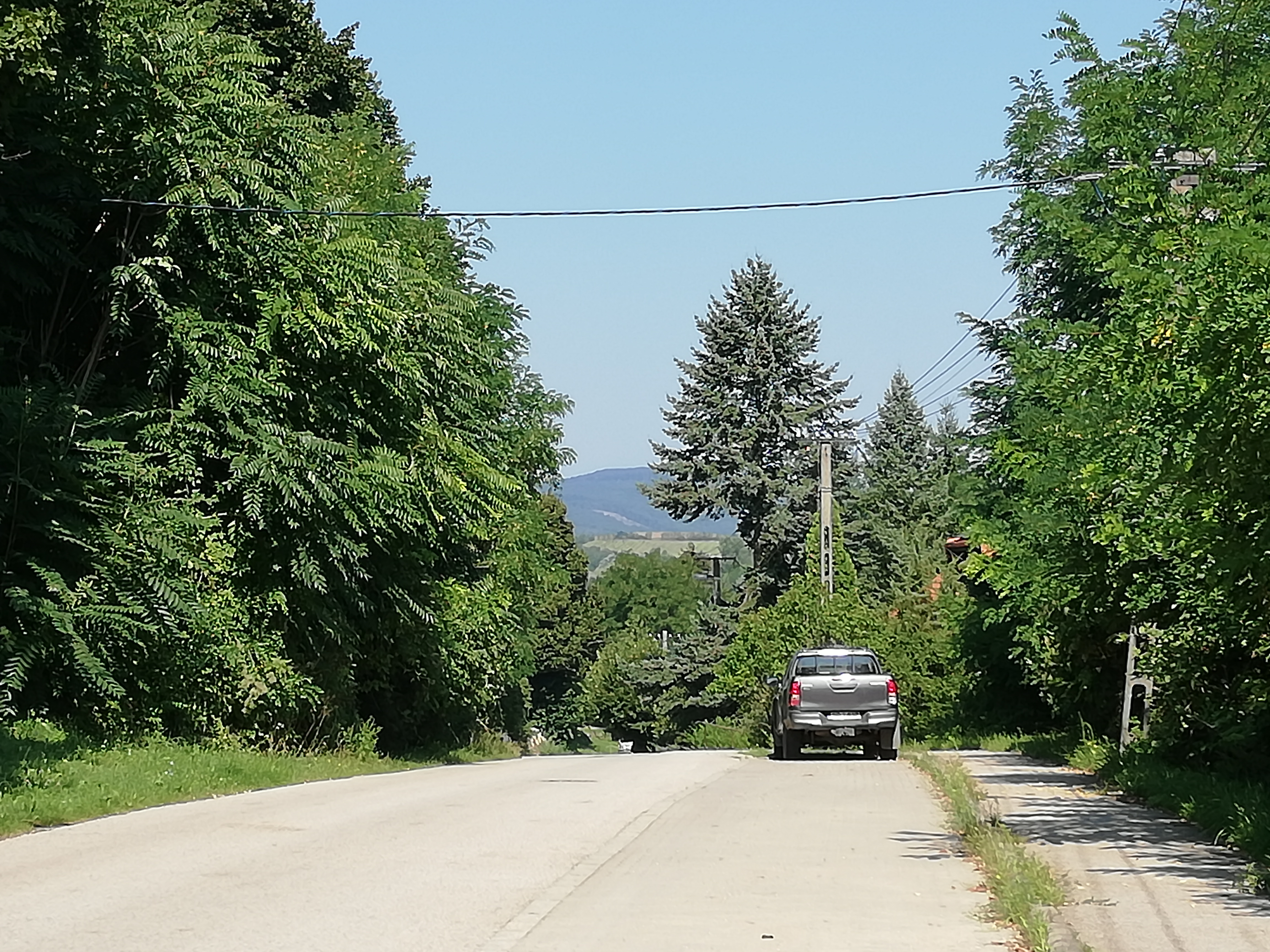
Szabadság street after the cemetery, looking towards Nagyegyháza

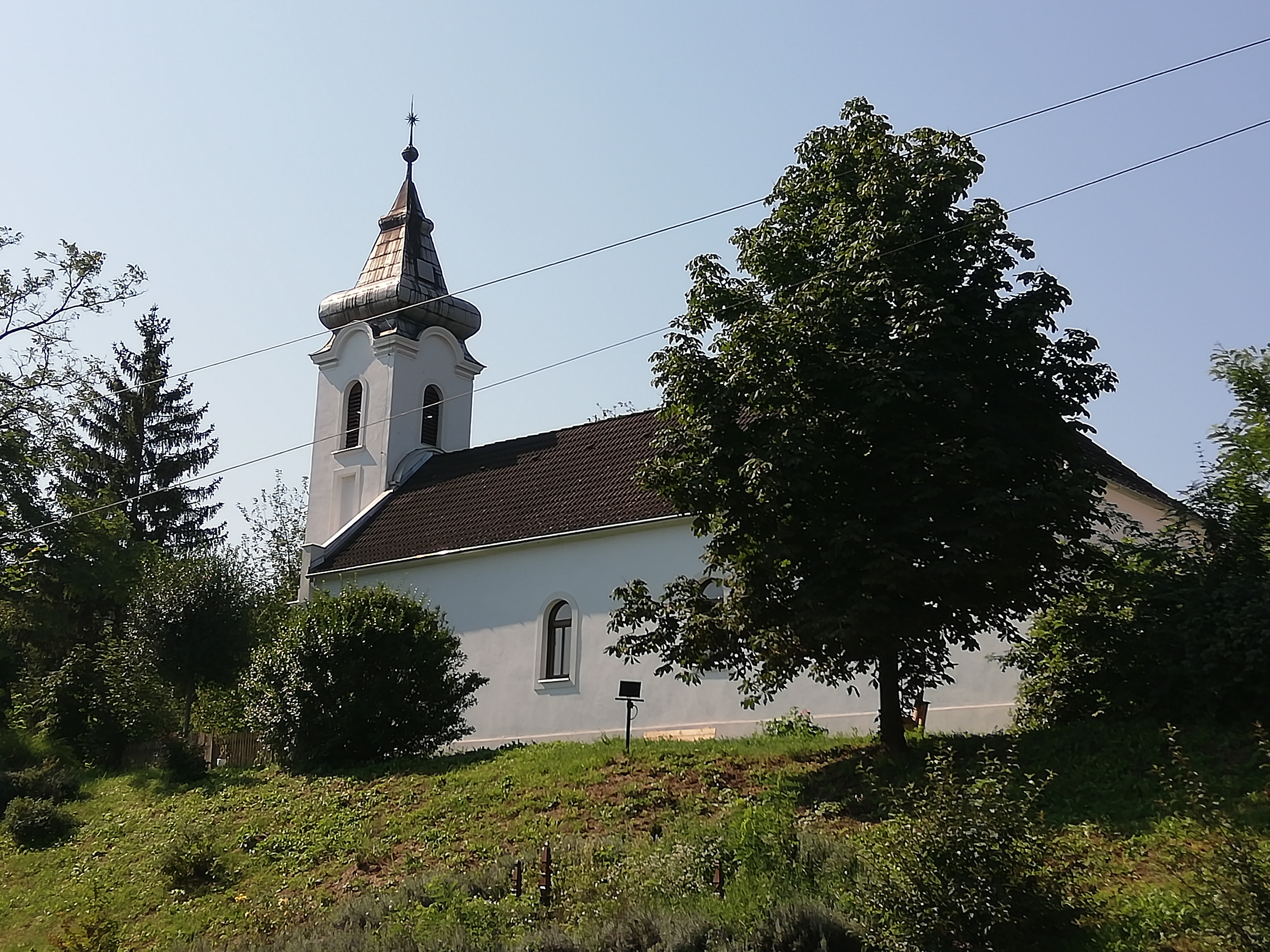
Csabdi Reformed Church

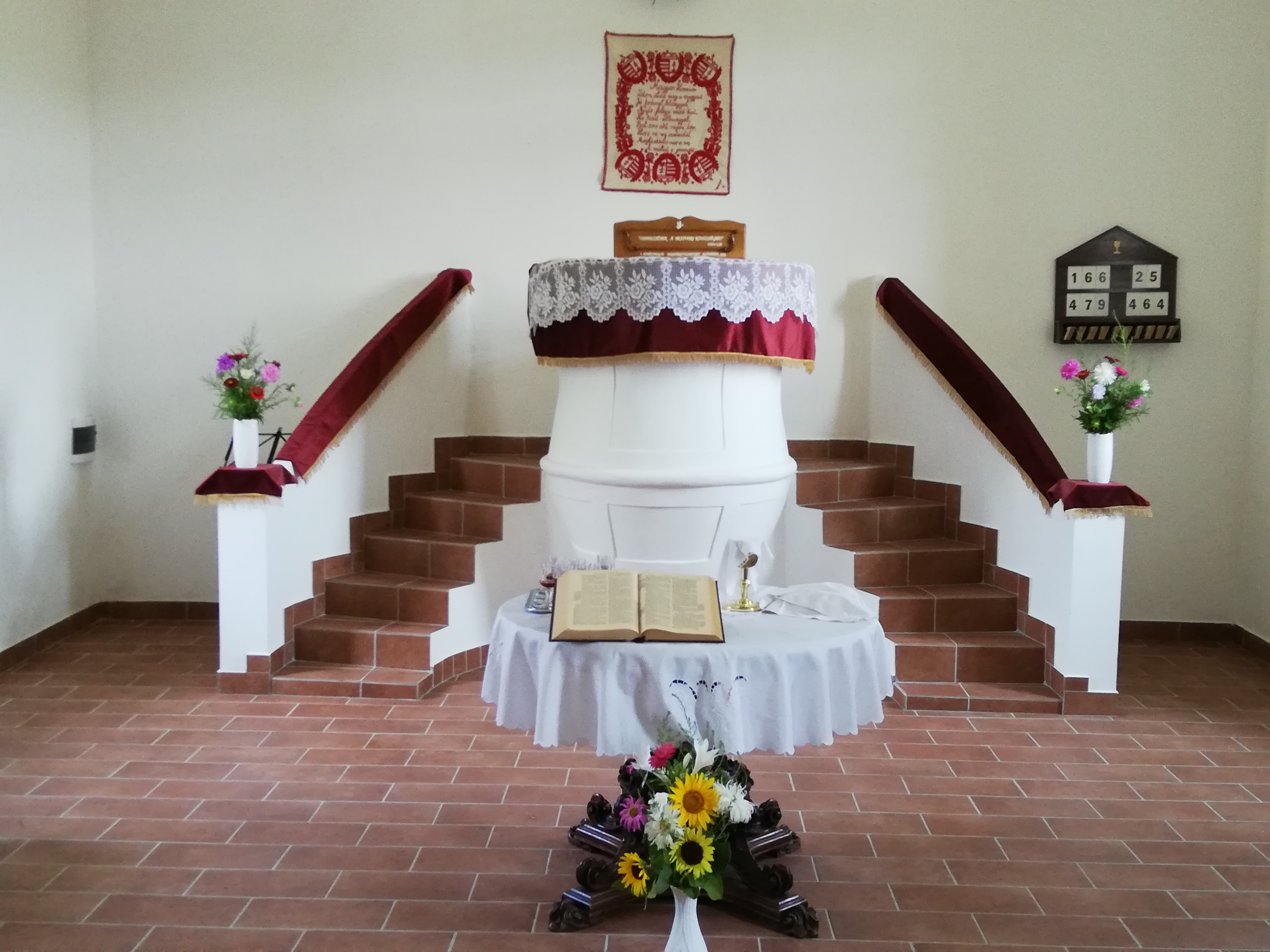
After the festive service inside the Reformed church

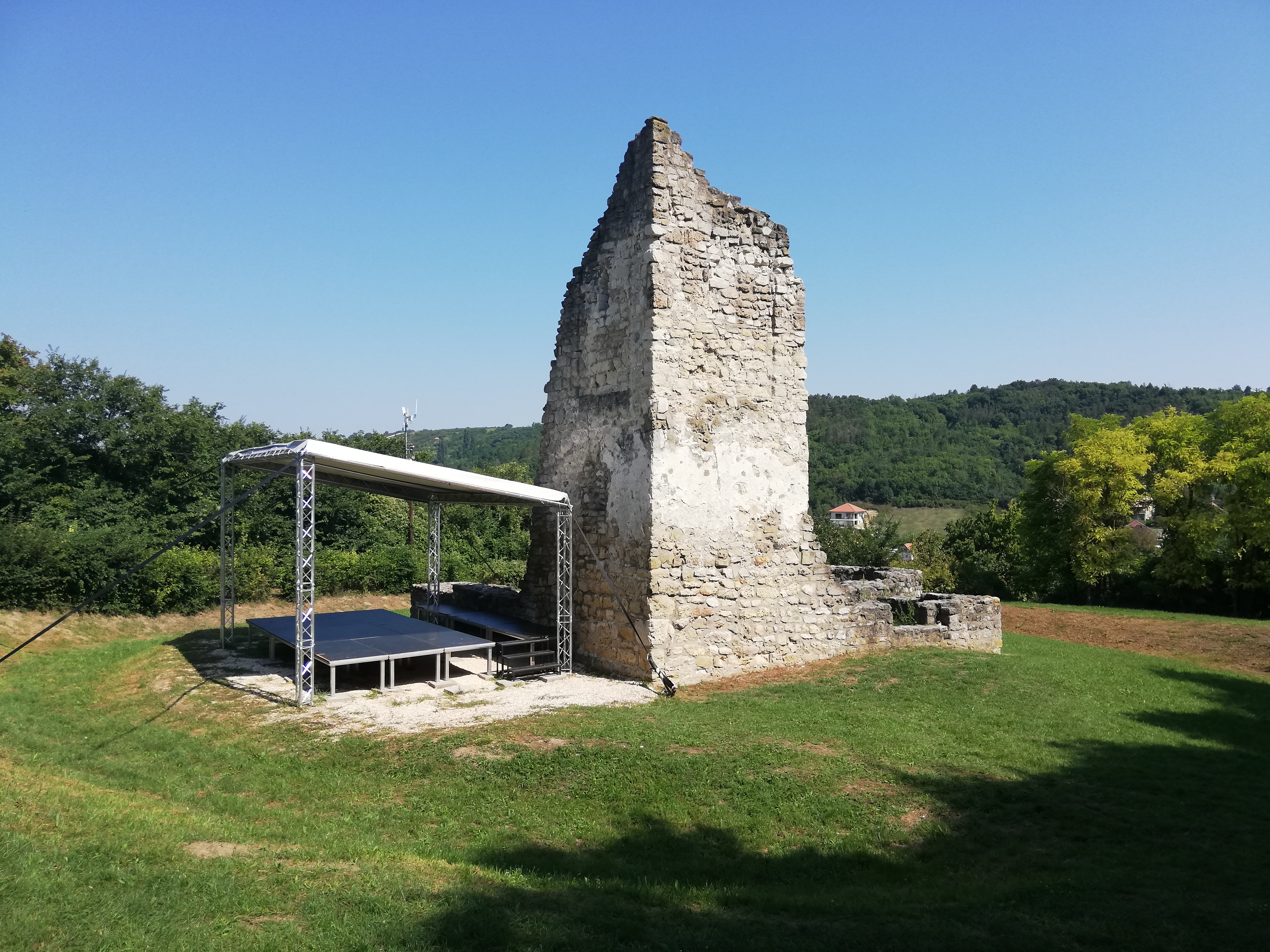
Temple ruin with stage

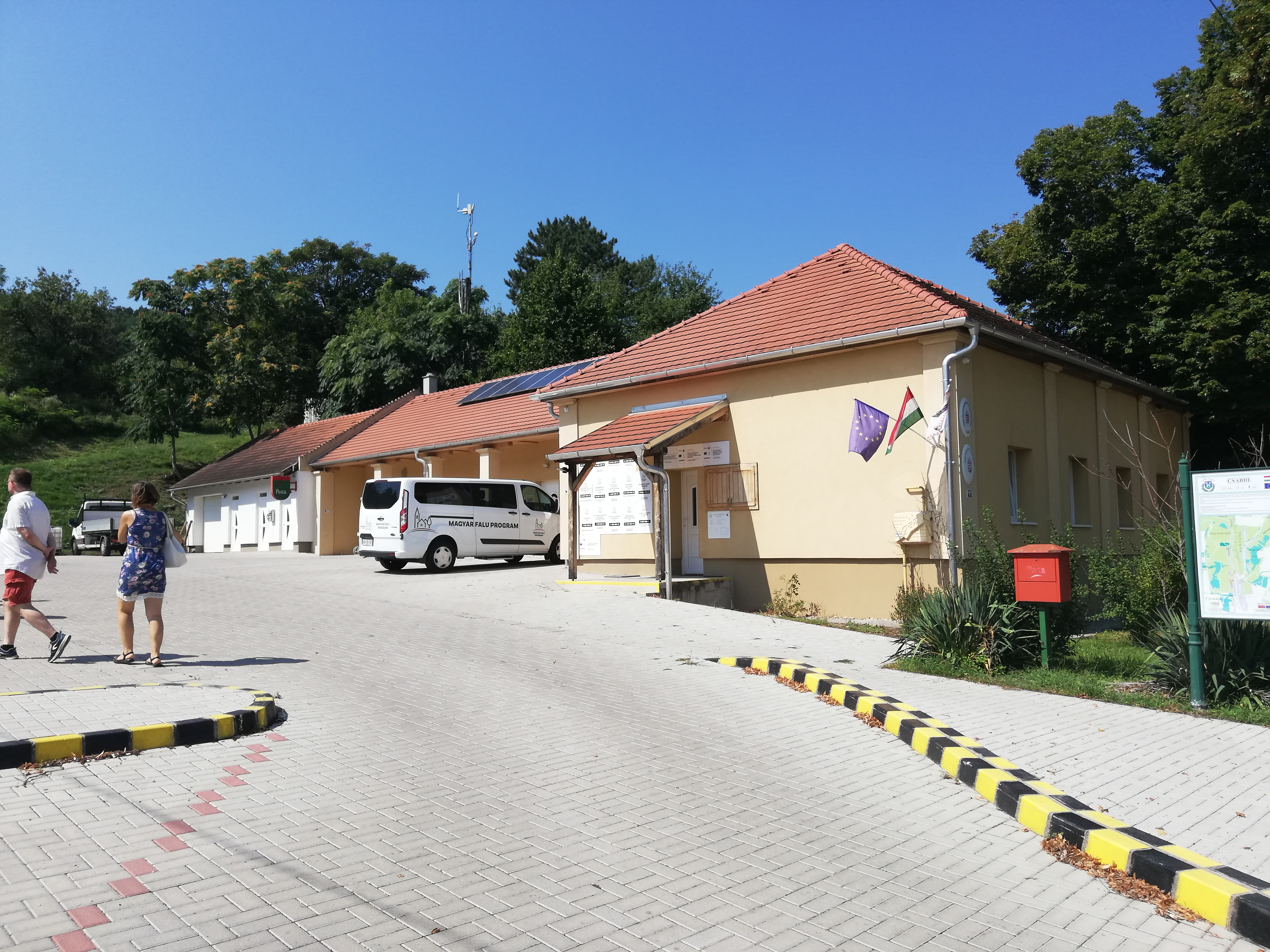
The courtyard of the village hall
