= Čičava =

- Municipality
- Flag

- Location of Čičava in the Prešov Region Location of Čičava in Slovakia
- Coordinates: 48.92°N 21.67°E
- Country: Slovakia
- Region: Prešov Region
- District: Vranov nad Topľou District
- First mentioned: 1270

Area
  - Total: 5.27 km^{2} (2.03 sq mi)
- Elevation: 156 m (512 ft)

Population (2025)
  - Total: 1,395
- Time zone: UTC+1 (CET)
  - Summer (DST): UTC+2 (CEST)
- Postal code: 930 1
- Area code: +421 57
- Vehicle registration plate (until 2022): VT
- Website: cicava.sk

Čičava (Hungarian: Csicsóka) is a village and municipality in Vranov nad Topľou District in the Prešov Region of eastern Slovakia.

== History ==
In historical records the village was first mentioned in 1270.

== Geography ==
The municipality lies at an altitude of 156 metres (512 ft) and covers an area of 5.27 km^{2} (2.03 sq mi) (2025).

== Population ==
Population statistic (10 years)
Year	1995	2005	2015	2025
Count	753	1020	1260	1395
Difference		+35.45%	+23.52%	+10.71%

Population statistic
Year	2024	2025
Count	1379	1395
Difference		+1.16%

It has a population of 1395 people (31 December 2025).

=== Ethnicity ===
Census 2021 (1+ %)
Ethnicity	Number	Fraction
Slovak	1176	91.3%
Romani	603	46.81%
Not found out	59	4.58%
Total	1288	

In year 2021 was 1288 people by ethnicity 1176 as Slovak, 603 as Romani, 59 as Not found out, 6 as Rusyn, 2 as Czech, 2 as Hungarian, 1 as Polish and 1 as Croatian.

Note on population: The difference values of population numbers in the table "Population statistic" and in the sections "Ethnicity" & "Religion" is caused by the use of various statistical methods.

=== Religion ===
Census 2021 (1+ %)
Religion	Number	Fraction
Greek Catholic Church	814	63.2%
Roman Catholic Church	270	20.96%
None	124	9.63%
Not found out	58	4.5%
Evangelical Church	13	1.01%
Total	1288	

In year 2021 was 1288 people by religion 814 from Greek Catholic Church, 270 from Roman Catholic Church, 124 from None, 58 from Not found out, 13 from Evangelical Church, 2 from Jehovah's Witnesses, 2 from United Methodist Church, 2 from Ad hoc movements, 1 from Eastern Orthodox Church, 1 from Church of Jesus Christ of Latter-day Saints and 1 from Bahá'i Community.

== See also ==
- List of municipalities and towns in Slovakia

== Genealogical resources ==
The records for genealogical research are available at the state archive "Statny Archiv in Presov, Slovakia"

- Roman Catholic church records (births/marriages/deaths): 1687-1895 (parish B)
- Greek Catholic church records (births/marriages/deaths): 1787-1901 (parish A)
