= Ploské, Košice-okolie District =

Ploské Lapispatak
- Municipality
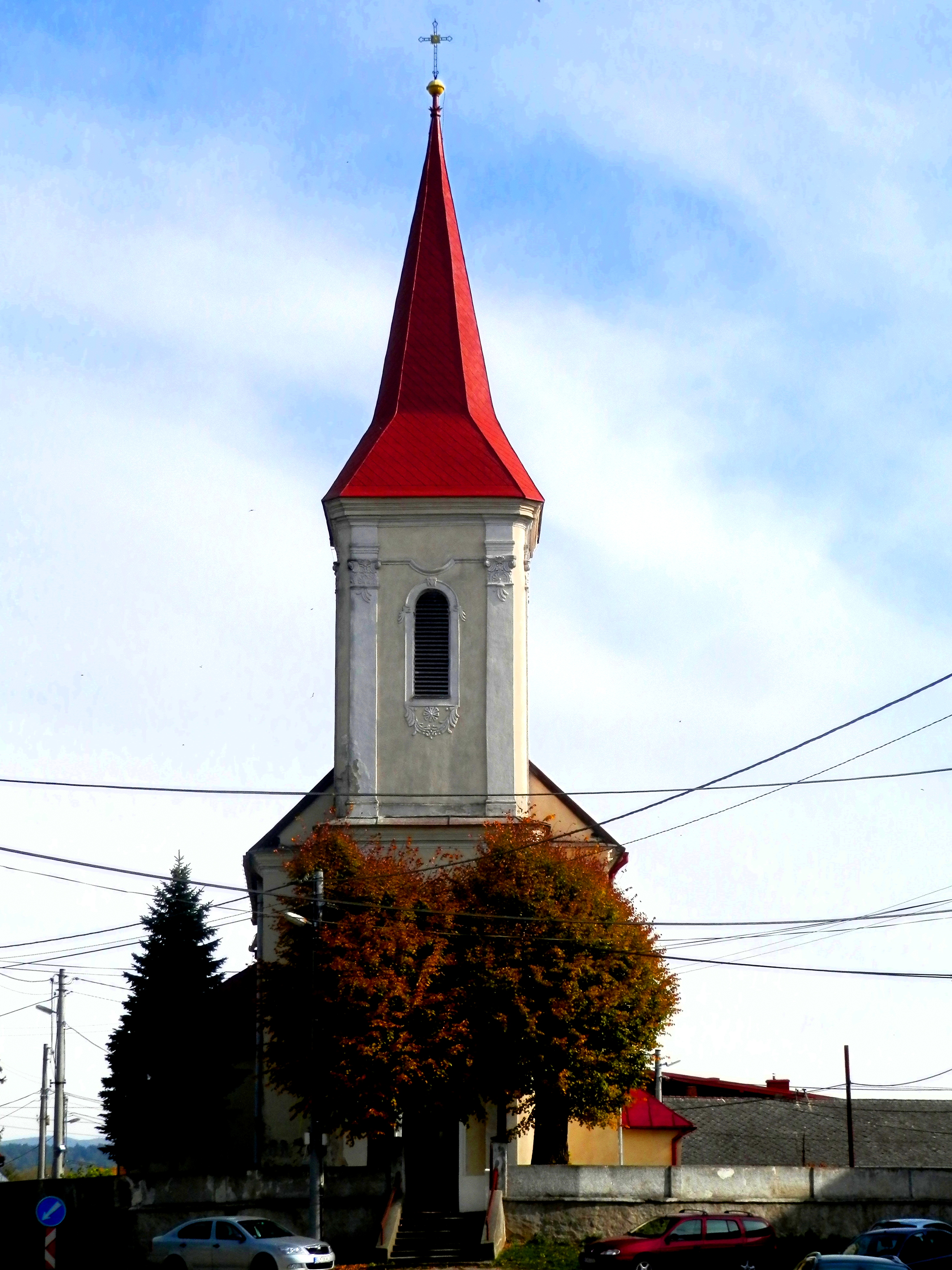

- Flag

- Location of Ploské in the Košice Region Location of Ploské in Slovakia
- Coordinates: 48.75°N 21.52°E
- Country: Slovakia
- Region: Košice Region
- District: Košice-okolie District
- First mentioned: 1270

Area
  - Total: 10.00 km^{2} (3.86 sq mi)
- Elevation: 277 m (909 ft)

Population (2025)
  - Total: 1,048
- Time zone: UTC+1 (CET)
  - Summer (DST): UTC+2 (CEST)
- Postal code: 444 4
- Area code: +421 55
- Vehicle registration plate (until 2022): KS
- Website: www.ploske.sk

Ploské (Hungarian: Lapispatak) is a village and municipality in Košice-okolie District in the Kosice Region of eastern Slovakia.

== Population ==
Population statistic (10 years)
Year	1995	2005	2015	2025
Count	680	803	886	1048
Difference		+18.08%	+10.33%	+18.28%

Population statistic
Year	2024	2025
Count	1032	1048
Difference		+1.55%

It has a population of 1048 people (31 December 2025).

=== Ethnicity ===
Census 2021 (1+ %)
Ethnicity	Number	Fraction
Slovak	903	94.85%
Not found out	56	5.88%
Romani	13	1.36%
Total	952	

In year 2021 was 952 people by ethnicity 903 as Slovak, 56 as Not found out, 13 as Romani, 6 as Czech, 6 as Ukrainian, 5 as Rusyn, 5 as Russian, 2 as Hungarian and 2 as Other.

Note on population: The difference values of population numbers in the table "Population statistic" and in the sections "Ethnicity" & "Religion" is caused by the use of various statistical methods.

=== Religion ===
Census 2021 (1+ %)
Religion	Number	Fraction
Roman Catholic Church	557	58.51%
Greek Catholic Church	169	17.75%
None	131	13.76%
Not found out	35	3.68%
Evangelical Church	31	3.26%
Eastern Orthodox Church	15	1.58%
Total	952	

In year 2021 was 952 people by religion 557 from Roman Catholic Church, 169 from Greek Catholic Church, 131 from None, 35 from Not found out, 31 from Evangelical Church, 15 from Eastern Orthodox Church, 5 from Calvinist Church, 2 from Ad hoc movements, 1 from Jehovah's Witnesses, 1 from Christian Congregations in Slovakia, 1 from Other, 1 from United Methodist Church, 1 from Czechoslovak Hussite Church, 1 from Seventh-day Adventist Church and 1 from Apostolic Church.
