= Rozhanovce =

Rozhanovce Rozhanovce Rozgony
- Municipality
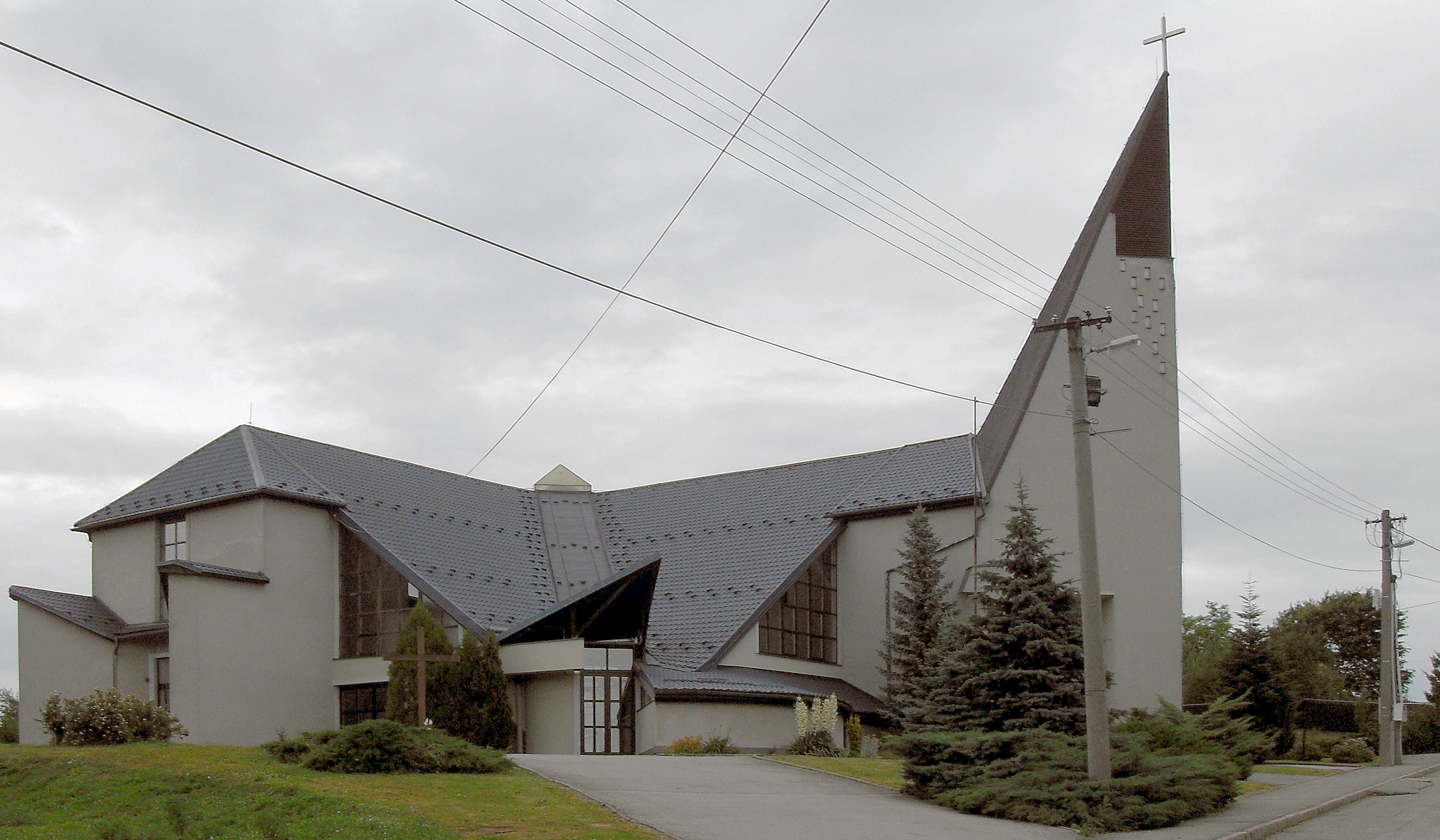

- Flag Coat of arms

- Location of Rozhanovce in the Košice Region Location of Rozhanovce in Slovakia
- Coordinates: 48.75°N 21.35°E
- Country: Slovakia
- Region: Košice Region
- District: Košice-okolie District
- First mentioned: 1270

Government
  - Mayor: Ing. Matúš Adamčík

Area
  - Total: 22.20 km^{2} (8.57 sq mi)
- Elevation: 218 m (715 ft)

Population (2025)
  - Total: 2,671
- Time zone: UTC+1 (CET)
  - Summer (DST): UTC+2 (CEST)
- Postal code: 444 2
- Area code: +421 55
- Vehicle registration plate (until 2022): KS
- Website: rozhanovce.com

Rozhanovce (Slovak pronunciation: [ˈrɔzɦanɔwtse]; Hungarian: Rozgony) is a village in Košice-okolie District of eastern Slovakia. It is situated about 20 kilometres (12 mi) far from the city of Košice.

== Geography ==
The municipality lies at an altitude of 218 metres (715 ft) and covers an area of 22.20 km^{2} (8.57 sq mi) (2025).

== Names ==
1773 Rozgony, Roscho[no]wetz, Rozhonow, 1786 Rozgony, Roszonowecz, 1808 Rozgony, Rozgoňowce, Rozhanowce, 1863–1913 Rozgony, 1920– Rozhanovce.

A smaller part of Rozhanovce is located on flat land and a larger part in a hilly area rising from the west to the east. The center of the village lies at an altitude of 215 metres (705 ft). The area of the municipality is 22.2 square kilometres (8.6 sq mi). The best view of this village is from the west.

In historical records, the village was first mentioned in 1270. Rozhanovce is best known for the Battle of Rozgony (June 15, 1312), in which King Charles I of Hungary decisively defeated the Amadé Aba family (Slovak: Omodejovci), who were supported by the troops of Matthew III Csák (Slovak: Matúš Čák). Both Aba and Csák were de facto rulers in Upper Hungary (today parts of Hungary, Slovakia and Ukraine).

In 2004, Rozhanovce had a population of about 2,160 people. 96.9% of them were Slovaks, 1.6% Romani. 79.4% of inhabitants were Roman Catholics, 7.7% Greek Catholics, and 3.9% atheists.

The festival called "Abov celebrations" takes place every year in Rozhanovce.

== Population ==
Population statistic (10 years)
Year	1995	2005	2015	2025
Count	2052	2141	2401	2671
Difference		+4.33%	+12.14%	+11.24%

Population statistic
Year	2024	2025
Count	2632	2671
Difference		+1.48%

It has a population of 2671 people (31 December 2025).

=== Ethnicity ===
Census 2021 (1+ %)
Ethnicity	Number	Fraction
Slovak	2407	92.89%
Not found out	145	5.59%
Romani	79	3.04%
Rusyn	40	1.54%
Total	2591	

In year 2021 was 2591 people by ethnicity 2407 as Slovak, 145 as Not found out, 79 as Romani, 40 as Rusyn, 24 as Hungarian, 14 as Czech, 7 as German, 5 as Other, 4 as Russian, 3 as Polish, 2 as Jewish, 2 as Ukrainian, 1 as Serbian, 1 as Austrian, 1 as Moravian and 1 as Albanian.

Note on population: The difference values of population numbers in the table "Population statistic" and in the sections "Ethnicity" & "Religion" is caused by the use of various statistical methods.

=== Religion ===
Census 2021 (1+ %)
Religion	Number	Fraction
Roman Catholic Church	1611	62.18%
None	384	14.82%
Greek Catholic Church	213	8.22%
Not found out	162	6.25%
Evangelical Church	84	3.24%
Calvinist Church	63	2.43%
Total	2591	

In year 2021 was 2591 people by religion 1611 from Roman Catholic Church, 384 from None, 213 from Greek Catholic Church, 162 from Not found out, 84 from Evangelical Church, 63 from Calvinist Church, 14 from Eastern Orthodox Church, 13 from Apostolic Church, 11 from Other, 10 from Ad hoc movements, 7 from Christian Congregations in Slovakia, 7 from Baptists Church, 4 from Old Catholic Church, 2 from Other and not ascertained christian church, 2 from Buddhism, 1 from Paganism and natural spirituality, 1 from Jehovah's Witnesses, 1 from Islam and 1 from Seventh-day Adventist Church.
