= Višňov =

Village and municipality in Slovakia

Višňov Visnyó
- Municipality
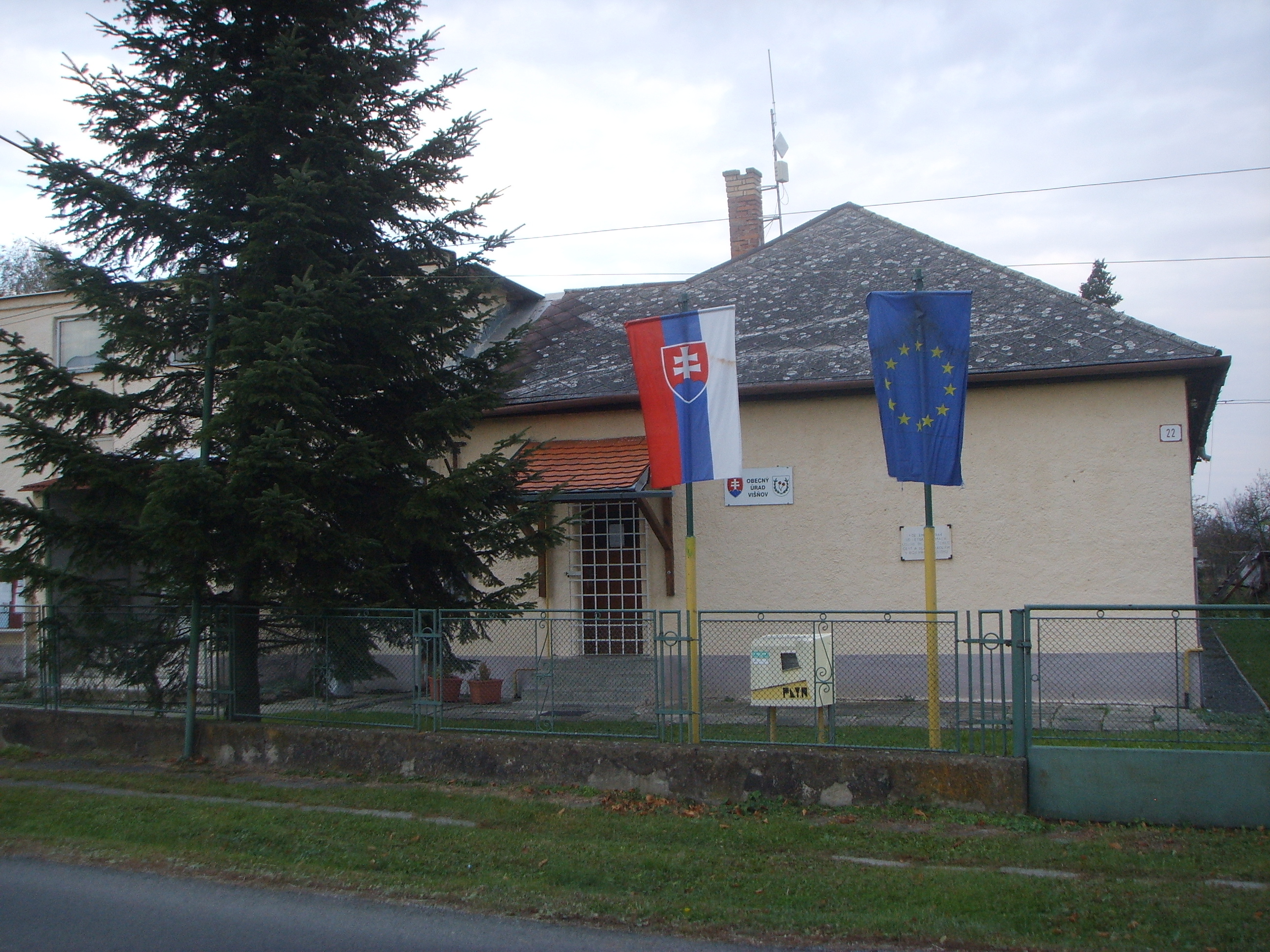

- Flag

- Location of Višňov in the Košice Region Location of Višňov in Slovakia
- Coordinates: 48.75°N 21.67°E
- Country: Slovakia
- Region: Košice Region
- District: Trebišov District
- First mentioned: 1270

Area
  - Total: 4.77 km^{2} (1.84 sq mi)
- Elevation: 131 m (430 ft)

Population (2025)
  - Total: 249
- Time zone: UTC+1 (CET)
  - Summer (DST): UTC+2 (CEST)
- Postal code: 766 1
- Area code: +421 56
- Vehicle registration plate (until 2022): TV
- Website: www.visnov.sk

Višňov (Slovak pronunciation: [ˈʋiʂɲɔw]; Hungarian: Visnyó) is a village and municipality in the Trebišov District in the Košice Region of south-eastern Slovakia.

== History ==
In historical records the village was first mentioned in 1270.

== Geography ==
The municipality lies at an altitude of 131 metres (430 ft) and covers an area of 4.77 km^{2} (1.84 sq mi) (2025).

== Population ==
Population statistic (10 years)
Year	1995	2005	2015	2025
Count	241	218	221	249
Difference		−9.54%	+1.37%	+12.66%

Population statistic
Year	2024	2025
Count	246	249
Difference		+1.21%

It has a population of 249 people (31 December 2025).

=== Ethnicity ===
Census 2021 (1+ %)
Ethnicity	Number	Fraction
Slovak	245	98%
Rusyn	7	2.8%
Other	3	1.2%
Total	250	

In year 2021 was 250 people by ethnicity 245 as Slovak, 7 as Rusyn, 3 as Other, 2 as Czech, 2 as Not found out, 1 as Ukrainian and 1 as Hungarian.

Note on population: The difference values of population numbers in the table "Population statistic" and in the sections "Ethnicity" & "Religion" is caused by the use of various statistical methods.

=== Religion ===
Census 2021 (1+ %)
Religion	Number	Fraction
Roman Catholic Church	156	62.4%
Greek Catholic Church	49	19.6%
None	24	9.6%
Jehovah's Witnesses	8	3.2%
Not found out	8	3.2%
Evangelical Church	4	1.6%
Total	250	

In year 2021 was 250 people by religion 156 from Roman Catholic Church, 49 from Greek Catholic Church, 24 from None, 8 from Jehovah's Witnesses, 8 from Not found out, 4 from Evangelical Church and 1 from Calvinist Church.

== Facilities ==
The village has a public library.
