= John Kőszegi =

Hungarian lord

Master of the horse
- Reign: 1311–1314
- Predecessor: John Aba
- Successor: Peter Csák
- Born: 1280s
- Died: after 1327
- Noble family: House of Kőszegi
- Issue: Nicholas I Tamási; Peter I Tamási; Henry I Tamási
- Father: Henry II
- Mother: N Dárói

John Kőszegi (Hungarian: Kőszegi János; died after 1327) was a Hungarian influential lord in the early 14th century, who served as Master of the horse from 1311 until 1314. He inherited large-scale domains in Slavonia and Transdanubia in 1310. After 1314 or 1315, he became an ardent enemy of Charles I of Hungary, who defeated him in 1316 and 1317, resulting in the collapse of his province within months. He was the ancestor of the Tamási family.

== Family ==
John was born into the powerful Kőszegi family around 1280 as the son of Henry II Kőszegi and his unidentified wife, the daughter of Palatine Mojs II. He had two siblings, Peter the "Duke", the ancestor of the Herceg de Szekcső family, and a sister, who married into the Venetian patriarch Morosini family. His three sons – Nicholas, Peter and Henry – bore the Tamási surname since 1339, when they first appeared in contemporary records. The Tamási family descended from Henry and provided influential barons during the reign of King Sigismund; the kinship became extinct in 1444.

== Powerful lord ==
After the death of his father in the spring of 1310, John inherited his large-scale and contiguous domains in Upper Slavonia – e.g. Krapina (Korpona), Belec, Kostel, Vrbovec (Orbolc), Oštrc (Oszterc), Đurđevac, Koprivnica (Kapronca) – and Southern Transdanubia – e.g. Somogyvár, Döbrököz, Dombóvár and Kőszeg (Batina) –, becoming one of the most powerful lords in the Kingdom of Hungary, who administered his province independently of the monarch. John inherited Henry's political positions too; he functioned as ispán of Bodrog, Somogy and Tolna counties from 1310 until his defeat in 1316. Initially, John continued his father's latest policy and nominally supported the efforts of Charles I, who became the incontestable King of Hungary after years of civil war fought for the throne. He was made Master of the horse in late 1311 and held the dignity until the second half of 1314. On 23 January 1312, Nicholas III Kőszegi confirmed his previously concluded alliance with the House of Habsburg in Fürstenfeld (Hungarian: Fölöstöm), beyond his own person, on behalf of his brother Andrew, his uncle Bishop Nicholas of Győr and the sons of the late Henry, John and Peter "the Duke".

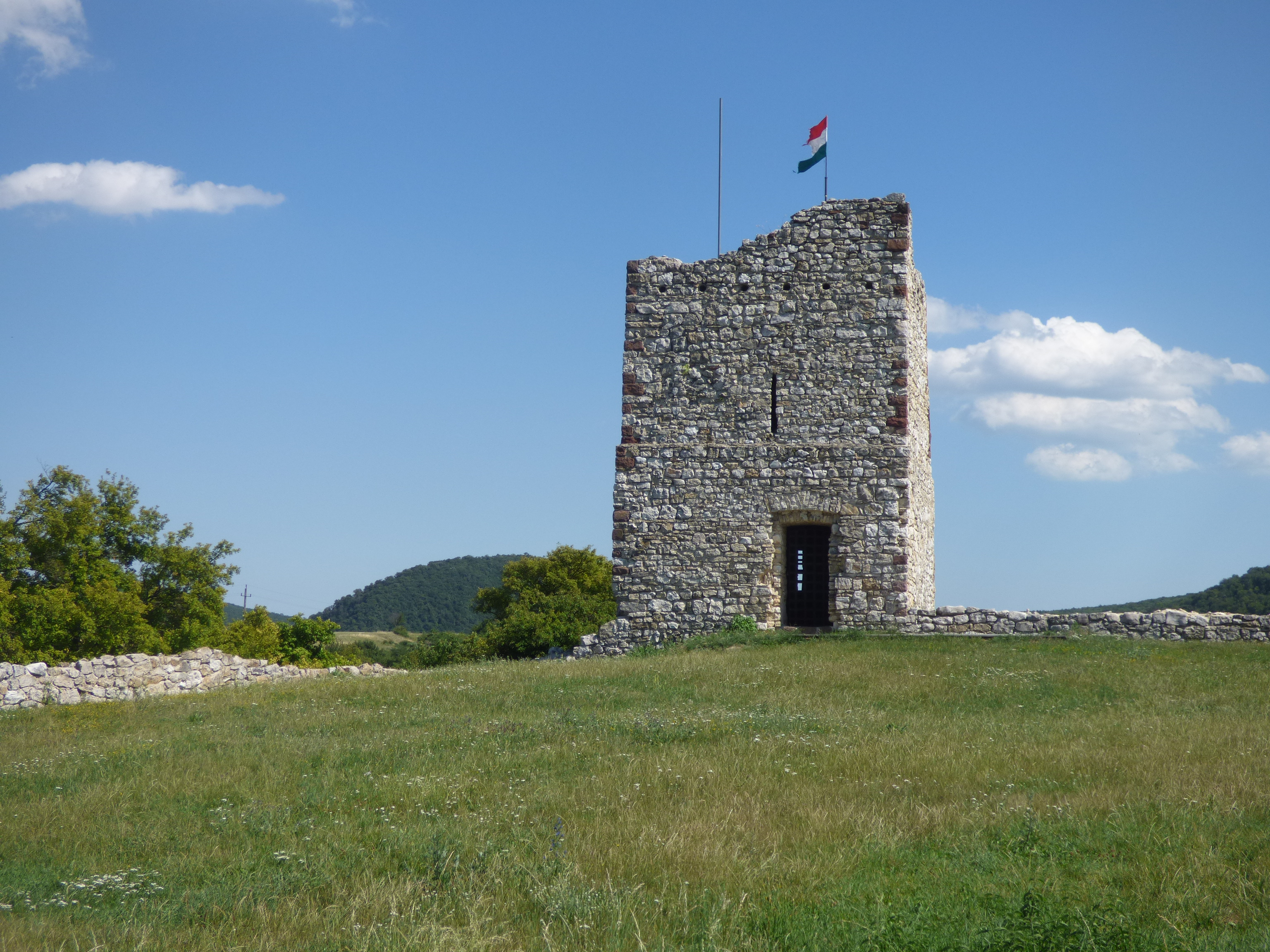
The ruins of Essegvár, seized by John Kőszegi

Despite his court position, John administered his province without the king's intervention. In the following years, there are several reports of his committed crimes and dominations against his neighbors, when aimed to further spread his influence over the remaining portions of Slavonia and the eastern counties of Southern Transdanubia. For instance, he seized the forts of Kéménd from James Győr around 1313 and Harsány from the Matucsinai family in Baranya County. There, he also owned Orahovica (Raholca), a possible heritage from his father. After his successful expansions, he was also styled as ispán of the county since 1315. In addition, John also owned the castles of Nyék, Tamási and Tolnavár in Tolna County at least since 1315. John also had interests in the southeastern part of Veszprém County, after he besieged and acquired Essegvár (today ruins near Bánd) from Lőrinte II Lőrinte around 1314.

Simultaneously, he also made plundering raids and invasions from his territory of Upper Slavonia. He acquired the fort of Ludbreg from the Péc kindred in Bjelovar-Križevci County and Béla Castle from the Priory of Vrana (Order of Saint John) and Lobor in Varaždin County. Around 1314, John also besieged and occupied Alsólendva in southern Zala County (today Lendava, Slovenia) from Stephen Hahót or his son Nicholas (formerly historians János Karácsonyi and Erik Fügedi incorrectly identified Ivan Kőszegi as belligerent and set 1292 for the date of the siege). Egidius Monoszló made his last will and testament in March 1313, not long before his death; according to his intention, his widow and minor orphan daughters were supposed to inherit the whole Atyina lordship (today Voćin in Croatia). However, as Charles I narrated in his document issued on 22 May 1317, John Kőszegi demanded Atyina for his family in accordance with the right of escheatage. Nevertheless, Egidius' son-in-law Nicholas Aba and his brothers acquired Atyina Castle. John Kőszegi captured and imprisoned Nicholas and Peter Aba (or Atyinai) shortly thereafter. In the first half of 1314, Nicholas was taken tied up before the Atyina Castle and dragged along the walls at the heels of a horse to persuade the defenders to surrender the fort. Despite this, John Kőszegi was unable to capture Atyina and took Nicholas back to prison, who languished in captivity in the subsequent three years. Sometimes before 1316, John also occupied the fort of Korođ (Kórógy) in Valkó County from its owners, the Kórógyi family.

== Downfall ==
According to historian Pál Engel, John Kőszegi's behavior regarding the heirdom of Atyina, among others, contributed to the open confrontation between Charles I and the oligarchic powers, which reached its peak at the general diet in the autumn of 1314. In Engel's hypothesis, Charles launched a military campaign against the Kőszegis beyond the river Drava in the summer. There were some clashes, where numerous familiares of John Kőszegi were captured. Accordingly, Charles summoned the diet thereafter and broke the alliance with the provincial lords and intended to defeat them one after another. In contrast, historian Gyula Kristó questioned Engel's analysis: there is no information that the diet has been held in 1314, which proved to be a peaceful year without serious military campaigns. Kristó said there are no proofs that a confrontation between John and the royal armies took place in that year, and it was only a local war against the Atyinai (or Nyéki) family.

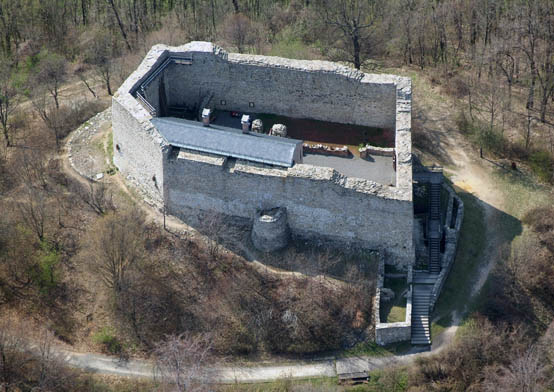
Máré Castle, owned by John Kőszegi until 1316

In the autumn of 1315, Charles I launched his first large-scale campaign against John and Peter Kőszegi and their territory. Charles personally led his troops into Tolna County. He besieged and captured the fort of Nyék in November. However John sought assistance from his relatives, Andrew, who administered Western Transdanubia and Nicholas II; they represented the other two branches of the Kőszegi family. According to Pál Engel, the united Kőszegi troops managed to expel the royal army from the region, while successfully recovered the castle of Nyék. Gyula Kristó doubted Charles' personal presence and considered the royal troops failed to take Nyék. After a few months of ceasefire, Charles launched his second campaign against the Kőszegis' province in Southern Transdanubia in the spring of 1316. John's relatives, were unable to provide help, including Andrew, because his several familiares pledged allegiance to the king and left his army in the same time. The royal army stormed into John's territory across the port of Báta along the Danube in May, in order to eliminate the Kőszegis' hinterland. They besieged and destroyed Somogyvár in Somogy County, then captured the forts of Tolnavár, Nyék and Tamási in Tolna County within weeks in June. Subsequently, Charles' army occupied Harsány and Kéménd in Baranya County before their ultimate successful siege at Kőszeg (Batina) in July. John's other castles in Transdanubia – for instance, Dombóvár, Szekcső, Döbrököz and Máré – surrendered without combat. Pál Engel argued several familiares of John Kőszegi, including Nicholas Felsőlendvai, Alexander Ozorai and Stephen Máréi, had departed from his allegiance before the war due to Charles' successful persuasion and bribery, which resulted the monarch's decisive victory. In the upcoming months, Charles handed over a significant part of the occupied lands and castles to their original rightful owners. The king returned to Temesvár (present-day Timișoara, Romania) by August. After the loss of Southern Transdanubia, John and Peter Kőszegi withdrew to Upper Slavonia beyond the Drava. Kristó argued the aforementioned minor clashes there occurred in the second half of 1316 (and not in 1314, as Engel proposed), when Mikcs Ákos captured seventeen servants of the Kőszegis, who tried to destroy the village of Križevci.

John and Peter Kőszegi entered alliance with the sons of the late Stephen Babonić, who ruled Lower Slavonia, at the end of 1316. Their anti-Charles league, which directed against the newly appointed Ban John Babonić, was also supported by a local powerful lord, Peter Monoszló. Charles I, who managed three other campaigns against the oligarchs – including Andrew Kőszegi – at the same time, sent his army, led by Demetrius Nekcsei, Paul Garai and Stephen Máréi, against the insurgents in June 1317. John Babonić launched a counterattack too; he defeated the Kőszegis in two battles and also captured several castles, including Orahovica, Monoszló (today Podravska Moslavina, Croatia), Plošćica (Polosnica), Međurača (Megyericse) and Zdenci (Izdenc) by the end of the year. Withdrawing to the northwestern portions of Slavonia, John Kőszegi was able to retain his lands and forts only in Varaždin County and Zagorje, where from his father, Henry II extended his power over the decades. There were some border conflicts in the following years, and John retook Međurača; Charles' general Paul Szécsi was killed, when attempted to recapture the fort in late 1318. John and Peter fought in the army of their relative Andrew, whose province was ultimately crushed by the royal troops in the first half of 1319. Nicholas Ludbregi recaptured Béla Castle for the Priory of Vrana by the end of the year, and finally retook his seat Ludbreg from the Kőszegi brothers in early 1320. John surrendered by the spring of 1320, only some castles remained in his possession, including Krapina and Koprivnica. On 18 March 1322, Charles I referred to John and Peter as "former rebels, now Our adherents".

When his namesake cousin, John the "Wolf" rose up in open rebellion against Charles I in 1327, John and Peter joined to him. However royal generals Mikcs Ákos and Alexander Köcski defeated them within months. During the military campaign, John Kőszegi lost his fortress of Koprivnica, which was captured by Mikcs Ákos. John died sometime after 1327, but presumably before 1336; when the Kőszegis made an alliance with the Habsburgs in that year, only Peter's name was listed among the traitors by Charles I. His three sons pledged allegiance to the king in May 1339; in exchange for Vrbovec, they were granted (back) Tamási, following that they were referred to with the surname "Tamási".

== Sources ==
- Engel, Pál (1988). "Az ország újraegyesítése. I. Károly küzdelmei az oligarchák ellen (1310–1323) [Reunification of the Realm. The Struggles of Charles I Against the Oligarchs (1310–1323)]". Századok (in Hungarian). 122 (1–2). Magyar Történelmi Társulat: 89–146. ISSN 0039-8098.
- Engel, Pál (1996). Magyarország világi archontológiája, 1301–1457, I [Secular Archontology of Hungary, 1301–1457, Volume I] (in Hungarian). História, MTA Történettudományi Intézete. ISBN 963-8312-44-0.
- Kristó, Gyula (2003). "I. Károly király harcai a tartományurak ellen (1310–1323) [The Struggles of Charles I Against the Oligarchs (1310–1323)]". Századok (in Hungarian). 137 (2). Magyar Történelmi Társulat: 297–347. ISSN 0039-8098.
- Zsoldos, Attila (2010). "A Henrik-fiak: A Héder nembéli Kőszegiek "családi története" [The Henry Sons: The "Family History" of the Kőszegis from the Kindred Héder]". Vasi Szemle (in Hungarian). 64 (6): 651–661. ISSN 0505-0332.

John House of Kőszegi Born: 1280s Died: after 1327
Political offices
Preceded by John Aba	Master of the horse 1311–1314	Succeeded by Peter Csák
