= Nicholas Kőszegi =

Nicholas Kőszegi may refer to one of several members of the Kőszegi family:

- Nicholas I Kőszegi (fl. 1266–1299), Palatine of Hungary
- Nicholas II Kőszegi (fl. 1314–1332), Master of the Horse and ancestor of the Rohonci family
- Nicholas III Kőszegi (fl. 1308–1313), Master of the Treasury of Hungary
- Nicholas Kőszegi (bishop) (fl. 1308–1336), bishop of Győr
