= Henry II Kőszegi =

Hungarian lord

Henry (II) Kőszegi

Master of the treasury
- Reign: 1302–1305
- Predecessor: Dominic Rátót
- Successor: Nicholas Kőszegi
- Born: c. 1255
- Died: March/May 1310
- Noble family: House of Kőszegi
- Spouse: N Dárói
- Issue: John; Peter Herceg a daughter
- Father: Henry I
- Mother: Henry's second wife

Henry (II) Kőszegi (Hungarian: Kőszegi (II.) Henrik, Croatian: Henrik III. Gisingovac, German: Heinrich III. von Güns; died between March and May 1310) was a Hungarian influential lord at the turn of the 13th and 14th centuries. He was a member of the powerful Kőszegi family. He extended his influence over Upper Slavonia since the 1280s, becoming one of the so-called "oligarchs", who ruled their dominion de facto independently of the monarch. After the extinction of the House of Árpád, he participated in the dynastic struggles. He drew Southern Transdanubia under his suzerainty by then.

He served as Ban of Slavonia three times (1290–1291, 1293, 1301–1310) and Master of the treasury (1302–1305). After his death, Charles I of Hungary defeated his sons and eliminated their province in 1316. Through his two sons, Henry Kőszegi was the progenitor of the Tamási and Herceg de Szekcső noble families.

== Family ==
Henry II was born into the powerful and wealthy Kőszegi family, originating from the gens (clan) Héder, as the youngest son of the powerful lord Henry I Kőszegi. His elder (half-)brothers were Nicholas I, Ivan – who were also elevated into high dignities during the age of the late Árpáds – and Peter, the Bishop of Veszprém from 1275 till his murder in 1289. Historian Attila Zsoldos argues Henry II was much more younger than his brothers (thus born possibly in the second half of the 1250s); he first appeared in contemporary records only in 1278, more than a decade after the first mention of his brothers, who exerted active political and military activity by then. In addition, he was also called "Herke", a kind of diminutive form, in the earliest documents, where his name was mentioned. Zsoldos considers Henry II was born from a potential second marriage of his father.

Prior to 1280, Henry married to an unidentified daughter of a prominent lord, Mojs (II) Dárói, Palatine of Hungary between 1270 and 1272. It is a widely accepted academic standpoint that the wife of Palatine Mojs II (Henry's mother-in-law) had family relationship with the Árpád dynasty, the royal house of Hungary through Queen Elizabeth the Cuman, thus Henry became a member of the Árpáds' distant kinship due to his marriage. Furthermore, his sister-in-law Elizabeth was the spouse of Nicholas Pok. Mojs died around late 1280. In his last will and testament, he donated the castle of Gordova (Grdjevac) and its surrounding lands in Slavonia to Henry. His matrimony produced three children; the elder son and heir John was the progenitor of the influential 15th-century Tamási family, while Peter the "Duke" was the first member of the Herceg de Szekcső family. His daughter was engaged to Turcho (Turchus), a member of King Andrew III of Hungary's Venetian kinship. In addition, historian Pál Engel claimed that Nicholas Kőszegi, Bishop of Győr was the illegitimate son of Henry, however, instead of him, it is more plausible, the prelate was the bastard of Henry's brother Ivan.

== Rebellions against the monarchs ==
Henry I Kőszegi, a significant figure of the era of so-called "feudal anarchy", was killed in the Battle of Föveny in September 1274. His power and wealth in Western Transdanubia were largely inherited by his two elder sons, Nicholas and Ivan, who divided their heirdom and the most valuable domains among themselves in 1279. Henry was excluded from the contract, only his wine growers were mentioned, to whom they were assigned certain vineyards in Moson and Pozsony counties. Historians János Karácsonyi and Attila Zsoldos considered Henry was granted lands in Slavonia from his brothers sometime before 1279, during an unequal sharing; his first lands laid in Varaždin County, the northwestern part of the province. There, it is presumable, he owned the castles of the late "Farkas of Zagorje" from the beginning, including Krapina (Korpona). Subsequently, the forts of Belec, Kostel, Vrbovec (Orbolc) and Oštrc (Oszterc) also belonged to his branch's property, but the time and circumstances of their acquisition are unknown. From these lands and castles on the southwestern corner of the kingdom, Henry expanded his influence over the territory, which was ruled by Joachim Gutkeled prior to that, between the rivers Drava and Sava (called Slavonia superior, "Upper Slavonia"), in the upcoming decades, and was considered the most powerful lord in the region by the extinction of the Árpád dynasty in 1301. For instance, he acquired the castles of Susica (later Szentgyörgy, present-day Đurđevac in Croatia) and Koprivnica (Kapronca) in Križevci County. During their family contract, Nicholas and Ivan did not renounce the possibility of their expansion into Slavonia, they both possessed landholdings and castles in the province too (for instance, Plošćica was owned by Ivan, which was later, however, acquired by Henry). In their agreement at Dubica on 20 April 1278, the Kőszegis and the Babonići divided the spheres of interest in Slavonia between each other. Henry and his brothers renounced territorial claims from all areas south of the river Sava (Slavonia inferior, "Lower Slavonia") in favor of Stephen Babonić and his clan, who acknowledged the Kőszegis' power north of the river at the same time. Henry Kőszegi exercised complete control over the region, where even foreign merchants were not safe. In 1279, Jacopo Contarini, Doge of Venice demanded compensation from Palatine Matthew II Csák for the confiscation of the goods of certain merchant Blandius Roger by Henry's soldiers.

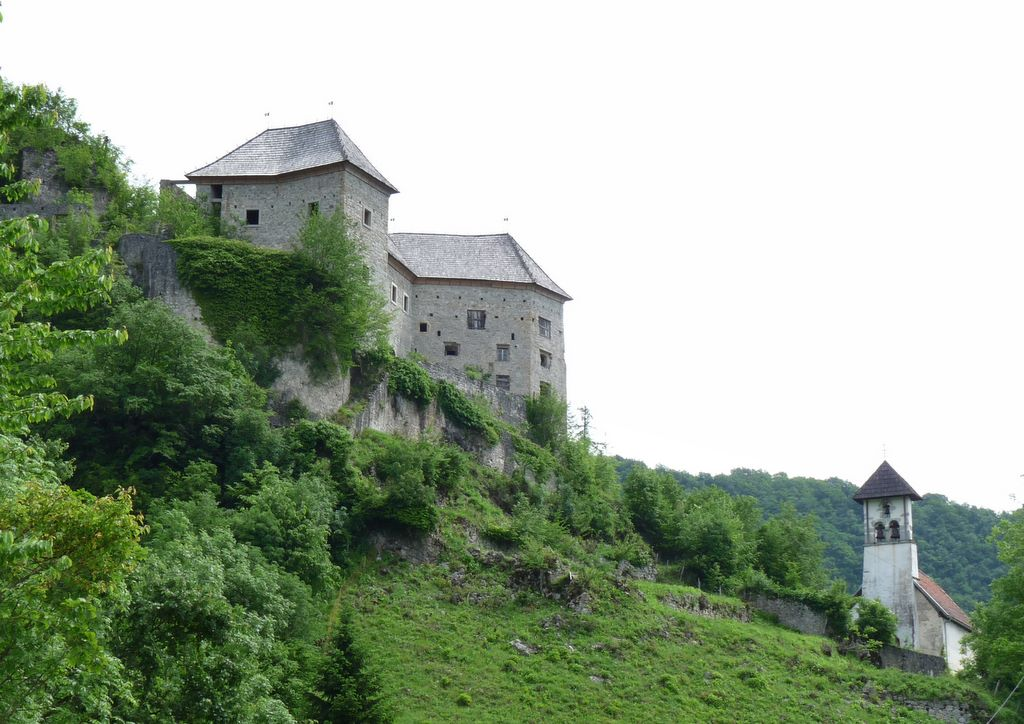
Kostel Castle, owned by Henry Kőszegi and his descendants until 1339

Since the 1280s, Henry assisted his elder brothers' political orientation and goals, in order to establish a coherent territorial province in Western Hungary, independently of the monarch, the young Ladislaus IV of Hungary. Taking advantage of the chaotic situation, which characterized Ladislaus' reign, the three Kőszegi brothers plundered the estates of the Diocese of Zagreb at various times in early 1281. As a result, Timothy, Bishop of Zagreb excommunicated them in March 1281. During the royal campaign against Ivan Kőszegi at the turn of 1283 and 1284, Henry provided help to his brother. Having Ladislaus failed, Nicholas, Henry and Bishop Peter stormed into Southern Transdanubia and jointly invaded and besieged the episcopal town of Pécs in March 1284. In the next year, when Albert I, Duke of Austria led his forces against Ivan's province after his series of looting and pillaging raids, and intended to besiege Borostyánkő Castle (today Bernstein, Austria), Ivan sought assistance from Nicholas, Peter and Henry, who recruited an army of 1,000 people.

The coat-of-arms of Slavonia

After the assassination of Ladislaus IV in July 1290, the Kőszegi brothers initially supported the new monarch, Andrew III in his external efforts due to their short-term interests in order to recover those castles and estates, which had lost following Duke Albert's war against the family in 1289 (the so-called "Güssing Feud"; German: Güssinger Fehde). But the Kőszegis acknowledged Andrew as their king only nominally. When the diet in the autumn of 1290 ordered the restoration of estates that had been unlawfully seized to their rightful owners, Andrew urged Henry to return some certain lands to local nobles in Slavonia, but he refused to do that. Replacing his brother Ivan, Henry was made Ban of Slavonia around July/October 1290. He held the dignity until the next year, when the Kőszegis participated in the king's military campaign against Austria in the summer of 1291, forcing Duke Albert to withdraw his garrisons from the towns and fortresses that he had captured two years before, many of which were held by the Kőszegis before their conquest. Henry, along with his brothers, was present during the peace neagotiations near Pressburg (today Bratislava, Slovakia). However, after the conclusion of the Peace of Hainburg in August 1291, which prescribed the destruction of the fortresses that Albert had seized from the Kőszegis, Henry's family turned against the king and he lost his position in the royal court sometime after October 1291, along with his brothers. After the suppression of their open rebellion against Andrew in 1292, Nicholas and Henry were cautiously willing to reconcile with the monarch, while Ivan remained a hard-line and unscrupulous rebellious oligarch. Henry was again referred to as Ban of Slavonia in February 1293.

Andrew III married Agnes, the daughter of Duke Albert of Austria in February 1296. Afterwards, with his father-in-law's support, Andrew launched another war against the Kőszegis in August 1296. While the Austrian troops besieged Ivan Kőszegi's some castles, Archbishop Lodomer excommunicated the brothers. Henry's position in the following years is unknown, he withdrew to his province and did not participate in Ivan's anti-royal activity, who remained a (nominal) supporter of the claim of the House of Anjou. Henry made plundering raids frequently against the Diocese of Zagreb and its place of authentication, the chapter of Čazma (Csázma) in the 1290s. Therefore, Bishop Michael Bő has applied for protection and accepted the suzerainty of the Babonići over his diocese. Henry Kőszegi concluded a peace with the bishop by the end of 1297 and handed over the forts of Gerzence and Garics (present-day Garešnica and Podgaric, respectively) to the diocese, which suffered from the endless warfare. Henry's attacks took place around the same time (in 1296), when Andrew III launched another royal campaign against Ivan Kőszegi, suggesting that Henry supported his brother's political orientation during that time.

After his election, the pro-Angevin Archbishop Gregory Bicskei absolved Ivan and Henry from the excommunication in March 1299. However, Nicholas and Henry pledged allegiance to Andrew III and attended the diet in the summer of 1299. Thereafter the delegates entrusted Henry to mediate between Archbishop Gregory Bicskei, who found shelter in Ivan's castle, and his pro-Andrew suffragans. Unlike them, Ivan was among the group of those powerful lords, who urged Charles II of Naples to send his grandson, the 12-year-old Charles Robert, to Hungary in order to become king. However, by the young pretender's arrival in the summer of 1300, both Ivan Kőszegi and Matthew III Csák were shortly reconciled with Andrew, preventing Charles' success. Attila Zsoldos argued Andrew III entered into a feudal contract with the barons in the summer of 1300: Matthew Csák and Ivan Kőszegi (who was the most senior member of the family after Nicholas' death) became "perpetual" Palatines and Andrew accepted their suzerainty over their provinces, while the king's two most powerful partisans, Amadeus Aba and Stephen Ákos were also granted this privilege. Simultaneously, Henry Kőszegi and Ladislaus Kán were created perpetual Ban of Slavonia and Voivode of Transylvania, respectively, acknowledging their dominance over the assigned territories. In order to sanctify the settlement, Henry's "very nice" daughter was engaged to Turcho, the grandson of Albertino Morosini, King Andrew's maternal uncle, as Italian envoy and merchant Petrus de Bonzano wrote in his letter in September 1300.

== During the Interregnum ==
Andrew III died on 14 January 1301. With his death, the Árpád dynasty became extinct. His death resulted a period of interregnum, which lasted for seven years and various claimants – Charles of Anjou, Wenceslaus of Bohemia, and Otto of Bavaria – fought for the Hungarian throne. Hungary had disintegrated into about a dozen independent provinces, each ruled by a powerful lord, or oligarch. Among them, Matthew Csák dominated the northwestern parts of Hungary (which now form the western territories of present-day Slovakia), Amadeus Aba controlled the northeastern lands, Ivan and Henry Kőszegi ruled Transdanubia and the northern parts of Slavonia, James Borsa dominated Tiszántúl, and Ladislaus Kán governed Transylvania. From the province of Slavonia, Henry Kőszegi gradually extended his influence over southeastern Transdanubia (his wife originated from there) and thus avoided the sphere of interests with the other two branches of his family; for instance, he acquired the castles of Somogyvár, Döbrököz, Dombóvár and Kőszeg (Batina) in the region. In addition to his dignity of Ban of Slavonia (1301–10), Henry served as ispán of Somogy and Tolna counties from 1301, and Baranya and Bodrog counties from 1304 until his death. Previously the Muslim-born Eyza held these offices. Henry was styled as "dux" and "princeps" by both Pope Clement V and Boso, the Prior General of the Carthusians in their letters in 1307 and 1308, respectively, which reflected Henry's ambitious and sovereign power in the province of Slavonia. As ban, Henry minted his own marten-adorned silver in the mintage of Virovitica (Verőce), called "denarius Herricy bani" or "banalis Verocensis".

The oligarchic provinces in the early 14th century

Immediately after Andrew's death, Charles of Anjou hurried to Esztergom where he was crowned king irregularly. Being Pope Boniface VIII's candidate for the Hungarian throne, Charles had always been unpopular, because the Hungarian lords feared that they would "lose their freedom by accepting a king appointed by the Church", as the Illuminated Chronicle narrates. Henry Kőszegi, who assisted and shared his brother Ivan's political intrigues and standpoint, was among those lords, who supported the claim of Wenceslaus. He was a prominent member of that delegation, which visited the court of Wenceslaus II of Bohemia in Prague and offered the Hungarian throne to the king's young son in the summer of 1301. Thereafter, Ivan and Henry, alongside many other barons, moved to Brno in order to welcome the young Wenceslaus, who arrived to Hungary with his father's army. Wenceslaus was crowned king on 27 August 1301. The Kőszegi brothers became the most powerful partisans of his brief and nominal rule. Henry was made Master of the treasury by Wenceslaus in the autumn of 1302, replacing Dominic Rátót. He held the dignity until 1305, but Prior General Boso still referred to his name with that title in his letter dated July 1308. As Wenceslaus' position in Hungary had dramatically weakened in the previous years, his father decided to take him back to Bohemia in the summer of 1304. Prior to that, both Ivan and Henry Kőszegi urged the king to intervene, who marched to Hungary with an army, but in the end serious fighting did not take place, seeing the hopeless situation of the young Wenceslaus. He even took the Holy Crown of Hungary with himself to Prague. After his arrival to Hungary in late 1305, Ivan and Henry Kőszegi took an oath of allegiance to Otto of Bavaria, but their support was only nominal and did not participate in the royal council. Because of his affiliation, Eyza, Charles' confidant commanded his troops to plunder and devastate the regions around the castles of Međurača (Megyericse) and Rača (Racsa) in Križevci County in Slavonia, both were the forts of Henry Kőszegi, in the winter of 1305.

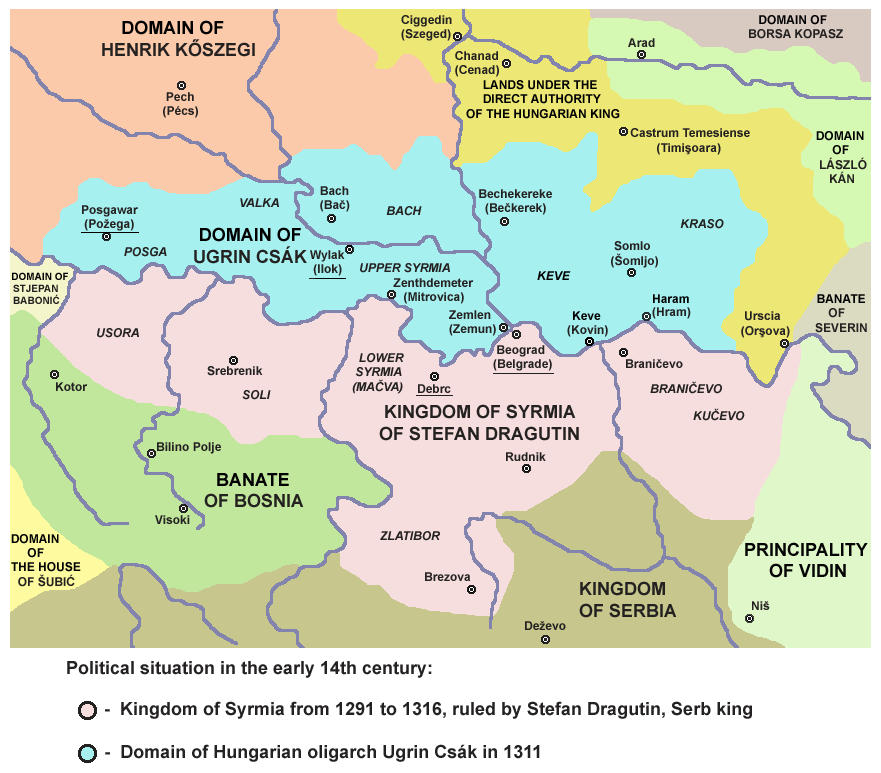
The eastern domain of Henry Kőszegi (orange) in Southern Transdanubia

There are several reports of dominations and military actions that Henry had committed during the era of Interregnum. He intended to expand his influence over the wealthy region of Syrmia. At the turn of 1304 and 1305, allied with local noblemen, the sons of Bágyon Csák, his army invaded the province of the powerful lord Ugrin Csák, the most ardent partisan of Charles of Anjou. Firstly, his troops ravaged Požega County, then Valkó County; Henry issued his charter in Valkószentgyörgy on 23 January 1305. They also pillaged and devastated the town of Eng, which then was liberated by Paul Garai, a renowned military leader, who belonged to Ugrin's household. Thereafter, Garai gradually ousted the invaders from Ugrin's territory. Simultaneously, the Kőszegi troops continuously looted and plundered the surrounding region with their raids from the occupied fort of Esztergom. Therefore, residing in Székesfehérvár, Archbishop Thomas excommunicated Ivan and Henry Kőszegi for their crimes against the burghers of Esztergom in July 1305. He also placed their provinces under interdict. Henry Kőszegi attempted to put the town of Pécs (Baranya County) under his suzerainty in the 1300s. Shortly after the sudden death of Bishop Manfred, his successor Peter was appointed by the pro-Charles prelate, Archbishop Thomas at the end of 1306 after the canons of the cathedral chapter of Pécs did not reach a consensus. However Henry's protege cantor Nicholas contested the appointment. In order to promote his movement, Henry Kőszegi captured castellan James and seized the fortress at Pécs, then handed it over to Nicholas who thus succeeded in prevent Bishop Peter from entering his see and collecting revenues from his bishopric. Thomas excommunicated the cantor from the church in 1307. The conflict has been brought to court of papal legate Gentile Portino da Montefiore in 1309. As Franciscan friar John testimoned, Henry ordered the canons to "designate someone to guard the church and the castle according to my will, and I will give you a bearded man who will steer you well". In August 1309, the legate excommunicated Nicholas, who fled Pécs and moved to Henry Kőszegi's territory. The conflict has been solved after the death of Henry, when cantor Nicholas acknowledged Peter as bishop, who could enter his see by the middle of 1310.

During these years, Henry also had the strength to play a role in foreign policy. Following the assassination of Albert I of Germany (1 May 1308), Henry of Carinthia and Otto III, Duke of Bavaria (the former Hungarian claimant) planned to invade the duchies of Austria and Styria. They convinced Otto III, Duke of Carinthia to marry his daughter to Henry Kőszegi's son in exchange for the Hungarian baron to attack Styria. Otto of Carinthia sent ministerialis Conrad of Aufenstein who convinced Henry to attack, emphasizing the defenselessness of Styria due to the absence of Frederick the Fair, who prepared a war against Bohemia. Furthermore, Otto promised him the Styrian and Austrian territories that were once owned by the Kőszegis. As a result, Henry's army entered the Styrian border and began to plunder the region in June 1308. However, Ulrich of Walsee gathered his army of 300 men at Marburg (today Maribor, Slovenia), thus Henry Kőszegi decided to withdraw to Hungary. Thereafter, Henry, indicating his influence over the region, took part in the mediation of peace between Frederick the Fair and Otto of Carinthia.

After the imprisonment and ultimate failure of Otto in Transylvania, an assembly of Charles' partisans confirmed his claim to the throne on 10 October 1307, but the most powerful lords, including Matthew Csák, Ladislaus Kán, Paul Šubić and the Kőszegi brothers were absent from the meeting. Henry became head of the Kőszegi family after Ivan's death on 5 April 1308. Pope Clement V sent a new papal legate, Gentile da Montefiore, who arrived to Hungary in the summer of 1308. In the next few months, he persuaded the most powerful lords one by one to accept Charles' rule. Henry and his grandnephew Nicholas (Ivan's grandson and heir) attended the Diet on 27 November 1308, where Charles was unanimously proclaimed king. Both of them appeared as leading participants of the national assembly in the subsequently issued document, representing their political influence and the great significance of their support for the Angevin pretender. In preparation for Charles' second coronation, Henry Kőszegi met papal legate Gentile, archbishops Thomas and Vincent, and other bishops and nobles in his manor at Tétény (present-day part of Budapest) on 4 June 1309, where he confirmed his oath of allegiance to Charles on behalf of himself, his grandnephew Nicholas and their familiares. Henry emphasized, he maintains his position too, in that case, if he is unable to attend the ceremony. Henry received guarantees in exchange for a written oath of loyalty; according to historian Ádám Vajk, for instance, he requested the confirmation of the election of Ivan's natural son, Nicholas as Bishop of Győr, in addition to the recognition of his rule over Upper Slavonia and the aforementioned four ispánates in Southern and Eastern Transdanubia. Eleven days later, Charles I was crowned king with a temporary crown in the Church of Our Lady in Buda on 15 June 1309. Henry and Nicholas did not attend the ceremony, but they were represented by their relative Bishop Nicholas. Benedict Geszti, Ugrin Csák's envoy at the coronation was captured by Henry Kőszegi's supporters on his way back to home. Henry Kőszegi died in the period between 20 March and 5 May 1310. His wealth and power was inherited by his elder son John, whose rebellion was crushed by Charles in 1316, ending the Kőszegis' rule in Slavonia and Southern Transdanubia.

== Sources ==
- Engel, Pál (1996). Magyarország világi archontológiája, 1301–1457, I [Secular Archontology of Hungary, 1301–1457, Volume I] (in Hungarian). História, MTA Történettudományi Intézete. ISBN 963-8312-44-0.
- Fedeles, Tamás (2017). ""A tűzvész tombolása következtében minden összeomlott". A középkori Pécs pusztulásai ["Everything Collapsed as a Result of the Raging of the Fire". Destructions of the Medieval Pécs]". In Varga, Szabolcs (ed.). Vészterhes idők a Mecsekalján. Háborúk, ostromok, járványok Pécsett az ókortól a második világháborúig (in Hungarian). Kronosz Kiadó. pp. 87–103. ISBN 978-615-549-79-71.
- Kádár, Tamás (2015). "Harcban a koronáért. I. Károly (Róbert) király uralkodásának első évei 1305 végéig [Fight for the Crown. The First Regnal Years of Charles I (Robert) until the End of 1305]". Történeti Tanulmányok. Acta Universitatis Debreceniensis (in Hungarian). 23: 42–111. ISSN 1217-4602.
- Kádár, Tamás (2017). "Harcban a koronáért. (II.) I. Károly (Róbert) király uralkodásának 1306–1310 közötti szakasza [Fight for the Crown. The Reign of Charles I (Robert) from 1306 to 1310]". Történeti Tanulmányok. Acta Universitatis Debreceniensis (in Hungarian). 25: 126–192. ISSN 1217-4602.
- Kristó, Gyula (1979). A feudális széttagolódás Magyarországon [Feudal Anarchy in Hungary] (in Hungarian). Akadémiai Kiadó. ISBN 963-05-1595-4.
- Kristó, Gyula (1999). "I. Károly király főúri elitje (1301–1309) [The Aristocratic Elite of King Charles I, 1301–1309]". Századok (in Hungarian). 133 (1). Magyar Történelmi Társulat: 41–62. ISSN 0039-8098.
- Rudolf, Veronika (2023). Közép-Európa a hosszú 13. században [Central Europe in the Long 13th Century] (in Hungarian). Arpadiana XV., Research Centre for the Humanities. ISBN 978-963-416-406-7.
- Szűcs, Jenő (2002). Az utolsó Árpádok [The Last Árpáds] (in Hungarian). Osiris Kiadó. ISBN 963-389-271-6.
- Zsoldos, Attila (2003). "III. András". In Szovák, Kornél; Szentpéteri, József; Szakács, Margit (eds.). Szent István és III. András [Saint Stephen and Andrew III] (in Hungarian). Kossuth Kiadó. pp. 119–227. ISBN 963-09-4461-8.
- Zsoldos, Attila (2010). "A Henrik-fiak: A Héder nembéli Kőszegiek "családi története" [The Henry Sons: The "Family History" of the Kőszegis from the Kindred Héder]". Vasi Szemle (in Hungarian). 64 (6): 651–661. ISSN 0505-0332.
- Zsoldos, Attila (2011). Magyarország világi archontológiája, 1000–1301 [Secular Archontology of Hungary, 1000–1301] (in Hungarian). História, MTA Történettudományi Intézete. ISBN 978-963-9627-38-3.

Henry II House of Kőszegi Born: c. 1255 Died: March/May 1310
Political offices
Preceded by Ivan Kőszegi	Ban of Slavonia; 1290–1291	Succeeded by Radoslav Babonić
Preceded by Radoslav Babonić	Ban of Slavonia; 1293	Succeeded by Radoslav Babonić
Preceded by Ladislaus Rátót	Ban of Slavonia; 1301–1310	Succeeded by Stephen Babonić
Preceded by Dominic Rátót	Master of the treasury 1302–1305	Succeeded by Nicholas Kőszegi
