= Peter Herceg =

Peter (I) Herceg

Ispán of Bodrog
- Reign: 1339–1353
- Predecessor: Nicholas Ostfi
- Successor: Andrew Lackfi
- Born: c. 1285
- Died: between 1353 and 1358
- Noble family: House of Kőszegi cadet branch: House of Herceg
- Spouse: N Babonić
- Issue: Peter II
- Father: Henry II Kőszegi
- Mother: N Dárói

Peter Herceg de Szekcső (Hungarian: szekcsői Herceg Péter; born Peter Kőszegi, also known as Peter the Duke; Hungarian: Kőszegi "Herceg" Péter; died between 1353 and 1358) was a Hungarian lord in the first half of the 14th century. He was born into the powerful and rebellious Kőszegi family, whose members were considered the ardent enemies of Charles I of Hungary. After years of wars and failed revolts, Peter pledged allegiance to the king in 1339. He became the progenitor of the Herceg de Szekcső noble family.

== Family ==
Peter was born around 1285 as the younger son of the powerful oligarch Henry II Kőszegi and his unidentified wife, the daughter of Mojs II, Palatine of Hungary. He had an elder brother, John and an unnamed sister.

He married an unidentified daughter of John Babonić, Ban of Slavonia. She was still alive in 1366. They had a son, Peter II, who was born after 1351, when Peter was already in advanced age. Throughout his life, Peter was referred with the nickname "the Duke" (Latin: Petrum Ducem). After 1339, it became his family name (Hungarian: "Herceg"). His kinship flourished until the 17th century.

== Career ==
Following the death of their father in 1310, John and Peter jointly ruled the inherited large-scale domains in Upper Slavonia and Southern Transdanubia, owning dozens of castles and landholdings. Initially, they nominally supported the efforts of Charles I, but later turned against the monarch by the mid-1310s. At the course of two brief royal military campaigns in 1315 and 1316, Charles defeated them and crushed their power and province in Southern Transdanubia. The brothers withdrew to Upper Slavonia beyond the river Drava. There, they were defeated by John Babonić, Peter's future father-in-law in 1317. Following that, John and Peter were able to retain their castles only in the region of Zagorje, where their father had started to expand his territory decades earlier. The brothers also fought in the army of their relative Andrew, whose province in Western Transdanubia was ultimately crushed by the royal troops in the first half of 1319. John and Peter surrendered by the spring of 1320, Charles I referred to them as "former rebels, now Our adherents". However, when their cousin John the "Wolf" rose up in open rebellion against Charles I in 1327, John and Peter joined to him. The king defeated them within months, the brothers lost another forts, further decreasing their number of castles.

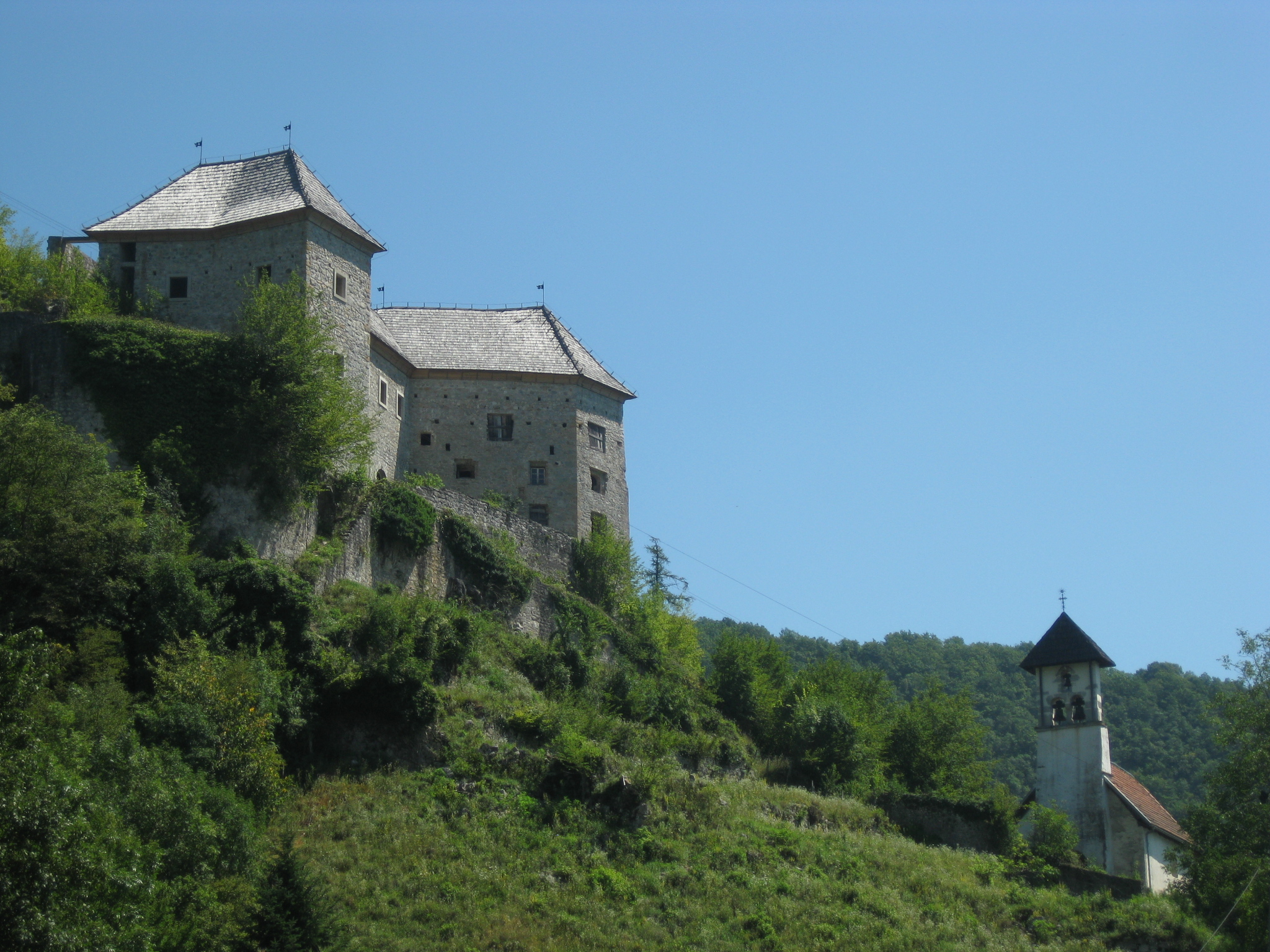
Kostel Castle, today in Slovenia

John died sometime after 1327. Peter and the three sons of his late brother was among those members of the Kőszegi family, who made an alliance with the House of Habsburg against Charles I in January 1336, alongside the Babonić family. When Charles signed a truce with his enemies on 13 December after a brief war, he called the members of the two families as the "traitors of the Holy Crown". The document put Peter's name in the first place among the traitors, before his nephews, his cousin John the "Wolf" and the Babonići. According to Charles' narration, Peter invited the Austrian army to Slavonia in order to try to acquire the province for the Dukes of Austria. For the sake of success, he even handed over his two castles, Vrbovec (Orbolc) and Štrigova (Sztrigó) to the dukes.

The war between Hungary and Austria continued until 1339. Charles obliged the Kőszegis to renounce their last fortresses along the western borders of the kingdom in 1339. While John the "Wolf" pledged allegiance to Albert II, Duke of Austria in June 1339, gradually integrating into the Austrian nobility, Peter and his nephews chose a different path: they returned to the loyalty of Charles. In exchange for his last fortresses in Zagorje – including Belec, Kostel, Krapina (Korpona), Vrbovec, and Oštrc (Oszterc), Charles donated Szekcső and Kőszeg (Batina) in Baranya County to Peter, both which he once co-owned with his brother before their rebellion. This effectively marked the end of the Kőszegis' rule and domination in Western Hungary after seventy years. Thereafter, he adopted the Herceg family name with the suffix "de Szekcső". Simultaneously with the royal grant of landholdings, Peter was made ispán of Bodrog County (which position was omitted as accessory to the dignity of Ban of Macsó since then). In contemporary records, he was styled as ispán in the period between 1342 and 1347, but it is plausible that he held the office throughout from 1339 to 1353. Peter retained his position during the reign of Louis I of Hungary too. In March 1351, his late brother's three sons, Nicholas, Peter and Henry (ancestors of the Tamásis) persuaded by lawsuit the then-childless Peter Herceg to adopt them and make them the heirs of his wealth, if he dies without children. However, his only son, Peter was born soon, which made the contract null and void. Peter Herceg died before 1358.

== Sources ==
- Engel, Pál (1996). Magyarország világi archontológiája, 1301–1457, I [Secular Archontology of Hungary, 1301–1457, Volume I] (in Hungarian). História, MTA Történettudományi Intézete. ISBN 963-8312-44-0.
- Skorka, Renáta (2017). "A "mohó farkas" utóda. Egy Kőszegi Habsburg-szolgálatban [The Heir of the "Greedy Wolf". A Kőszegi in the Service of the Habsburg Dukes]". Világtörténet (in Hungarian). 39 (1): 93–124. ISSN 0083-6265.
- Zsoldos, Attila (2010). "A Henrik-fiak: A Héder nembéli Kőszegiek "családi története" [The Henry Sons: The "Family History" of the Kőszegis from the Kindred Héder]". Vasi Szemle (in Hungarian). 64 (6): 651–661. ISSN 0505-0332.

Peter I House of Herceg Cadet branch of the House of Kőszegi Born: c. 1285 Died: 1353/58
Political offices
Preceded by Nicholas Ostfi	Ispán of Bodrog; 1339–1353	Succeeded by Andrew Lackfi
