= Lucas III Péc =

Hungarian noble

Lucas (III) Péc

Ispán of Zala
- Reign: 1289–1291; 1298
- Predecessor: Denis Péc (1st term); Gregory Kőszegi (2nd term)
- Successor: Gregory Kőszegi (1st term); Amadeus Aba (2nd term)
- Died: after 1298
- Noble family: gens Péc
- Issue: Desiderius; Apor Szentgyörgyi; Stephen II; Egidius; Nicholas
- Father: Mark I

Lucas (III) from the kindred Péc (Hungarian: Péc nembeli (III.) Lukács; died after 1298) was a Hungarian noble, who served as ispán of Zala County from 1289 to 1291 and in 1298. He was also known as Lucas of Tátika.

== Life ==
Lucas III originated from the Zala branch of the extended gens (clan) Péc, which had large-scale possessions in several counties of Transdanubia, in addition to other parts of the Kingdom of Hungary. He was a son of Mark I, who appeared in contemporary documents in the period between 1240 and 1245. Lucas had four brothers, Gregory, Mark II, Stephen I and Apor. Lucas had five sons. One of them Apor was called with the surname "Szentgyörgyi", but his family became extinct after two or three generations sometimes before 1431. His other four sons (Desiderius, Stephen II, Egidius and Nicholas) had no known descendants.

Lucas is first mentioned by contemporary records in 1289, when he already served as ispán of Zala County. He held the dignity until mid-1291, when he was replaced by Gregory Kőszegi. Sometimes before 1291, shortly after the death of Bishop Peter Kőszegi, Lucas and his brother Apor successfully besieged and captured Tátika Castle (located near Zalaszántó), which belonged to the property of the Diocese of Veszprém. The bishop, Benedict Rád vainly objected at the royal court, but without success. Thereafter, Lucas and his offspring were sometimes called with the title "of Tátika". However the castle was lost to the Kőszegi family by 1314, when Andrew Kőszegi owned the fort.

As a supporter of Andrew III of Hungary in his efforts against the oligarchic powers, including the Kőszegis, Lucas functioned as Master of the treasury in the court of Queen Fenenna of Kuyavia in 1291. He participated in the Austrian–Hungarian war in that year. He was present when the envoys of the two realm met near Pressburg (today Bratislava, Slovakia) to conclude the war in August 1291. He was again made ispán of Zala County by 1298, but it is possible he held the dignity without interruption since 1289, as Gregory Kőszegi could usurp the title in his documents.

== Sources ==
- Engel, Pál (1996). Magyarország világi archontológiája, 1301–1457, I. [Secular Archontology of Hungary, 1301–1457, Volume I] (in Hungarian). História, MTA Történettudományi Intézete. ISBN 963-8312-44-0.
- Zsoldos, Attila (2011). Magyarország világi archontológiája, 1000–1301 [Secular Archontology of Hungary, 1000–1301] (in Hungarian). História, MTA Történettudományi Intézete. ISBN 978-963-9627-38-3.

Lucas III Genus Péc Born: ? Died: after 1298
Political offices
Preceded by Denis Péc	Ispán of Zala; 1289–1291	Succeeded by Gregory Kőszegi
Preceded by Gregory Kőszegi	Ispán of Zala; 1298	Succeeded by Amadeus Aba
