= Makján Aba =

Hungarian nobleman

Makján (II) Aba
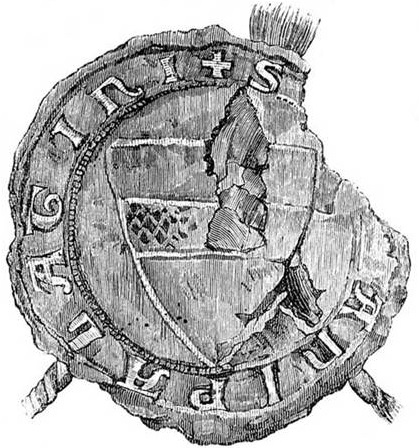
- Seal of Makján Aba, 1286

Palatine of Hungary
- Reign: 1286–1287
- Predecessor: Nicholas Kőszegi
- Successor: Ivan Kőszegi
- Died: after 1288
- Noble family: gens Aba
- Father: Bökény I

Makján (II) from the kindred Aba (Hungarian: Aba nembeli (II.) Makján; died after 1288) was a Hungarian nobleman who served as Palatine of Hungary from 1286 to 1287. He was a staunch supporter of Ladislaus IV of Hungary.

== Ancestry ==
Makján (or Mokyanus) was born into the minor and less significant Debrő branch of the powerful and extended gens (clan) Aba. His father was Bökény I, the owner of Tállya and its castle in Zemplén County. Formerly, historian Pál Engel incorrectly identified him as the son of Becse II, Bökény's brother. In fact, Makján III, the ancestor of the Debrői family and builder of the Makján Castle (today ruins near Egerszalók, Heves County) was his cousin. Makján had two brothers, Philip and Nicholas.

== Career ==
Alongside other lower nobles from Eastern Hungary and Transtisia, for instance Michael Balogsemjén, Rubinus Hermán and Mizse, he committed to supporting the efforts of King Ladislaus IV ("the Cuman"). Hungary's central government lost power because the prelates and the barons ruled the kingdom independently of the monarch. In order to eliminate the powerful barons' influence over the royal council, Ladislaus managed a self-coup in September 1286, expelling members of the Kőszegi–Borsa baronial group from the government body. Neglecting the Kőszegis' rival, the Széplak branch of the Aba clan, represented by Amadeus and Peter, Makján's very distant relatives, Ladislaus IV appointed his own loyal soldiers and lesser nobles to the high positions. In addition, Ladislaus imprisoned his wife Elizabeth and granted all her revenues to his Cuman mistress.

During his autocratic attempt, Ladislaus made Makján Aba as Palatine of Hungary. Beside that, he was also appointed ispán of Sopron, Moson and Somogy counties. However these titles were purely nominal as the rebellious and oligarchic Kőszegi family ruled de facto independently the western parts of Transdanubia, including the aforementioned three counties by then. Makján was mentioned in these four capacities only in a single document issued in Sárospatak on 13 October 1286. Accordingly, Makján summoned a "general assembly" (general congregatio) prior to that for the local nobles in Zemplén County, the ancient seat of the Aba kindred, at the command of the king. There Makján judged over a homicide case between two nobles. It is plausible that Makján held his dignity until spring 1287, when the Kőszegi troops defeated Ladislaus' army at the river Zsitva (Žitava). The monarch was forced to reconcile with the barons thereafter; Ivan Kőszegi was made Palatine by June.

After his brief and ephemeral role in the national government, Makján lost all political influence and relapsed into the status of lower nobility. His lord and patron, Ladislaus IV spent the last years of his reign wandering from place to place, staying among his Cuman subjects. When Archbishop Lodomer absolved Ladislaus on condition that the king would live in accordance with Christian morals, the king also promised to dismiss his "perfidious, disgraceful Catholic advisors", which perhaps referred to Makján, along with other nobles. Makján was last mentioned by contemporary records in August 1288, when he and his brother Philip were present as witnesses during a determination of borders of three lands. Makján still used the honorary title of palatine in the document.

== Sources ==
- Markó, László (2006). A magyar állam főméltóságai Szent Istvántól napjainkig: Életrajzi Lexikon [Great Officers of State in Hungary from King Saint Stephen to Our Days: A Biographical Encyclopedia] (in Hungarian). Helikon Kiadó. ISBN 963-208-970-7.
- Szőcs, Tibor (2012). Az Árpád-kori nádorok és helyetteseik okleveleinek kritikai jegyzéke [A Critical Register of Charters from Palatines and their Deputies of the Árpádian Era] (in Hungarian). Magyar Országos Levéltár. ISBN 978-963-631-219-0.
- Szőcs, Tibor (2014). A nádori intézmény korai története, 1000–1342 [An Early History of the Palatinal Institution: 1000–1342] (in Hungarian). Magyar Tudományos Akadémia Támogatott Kutatások Irodája. ISBN 978-963-508-697-9.
- Szűcs, Jenő (2002). Az utolsó Árpádok [The Last Árpáds] (in Hungarian). Osiris Kiadó. ISBN 963-389-271-6.
- Zsoldos, Attila (2011). Magyarország világi archontológiája, 1000–1301 [Secular Archontology of Hungary, 1000–1301] (in Hungarian). História, MTA Történettudományi Intézete. ISBN 978-963-9627-38-3.

Makján II Genus Aba Born: ? Died: after 1288
Political offices
| Preceded by Nicholas Kőszegi | Palatine of Hungary; 1286–1287 | Succeeded by Ivan Kőszegi |
