= Gregory Kőszegi =

Hungarian nobleman in the 13th century

Ispán of Zala
- Reign: 1291
- Predecessor: Lucas Péc
- Successor: Lucas Péc
- Died: 1297
- Noble family: House of Kőszegi
- Issue: Nicholas III; Andrew
- Father: Ivan

Gregory Kőszegi (Hungarian: Kőszegi Gergely; died 1297) was a Hungarian nobleman in the 13th century, member of the illustrious Kőszegi family, who held several ispánates during the reign of Andrew III of Hungary.

== Biography ==
Gregory was the firstborn son of the powerful lord Ivan Kőszegi. He had a sister, who married a certain Dominic and a brother John the Wolf, who was presumably born after Gregory's death, and integrated into the Austrian nobility. He also had a stepbrother from his father's extramarital affair, Nicholas (born 1282), who entered ecclesiastical career and elevated into the dignity of Bishop of Győr. Gregory had two sons from his unidentified wife: Nicholas III and Andrew, who were still minors during his death and inherited their grandfather's wealth and power after 1308.

The future Andrew III came to Hungary for the first time in 1278 at the invitation of Ivan Kőszegi, who wanted to play Andrew off against Ladislaus IV of Hungary. Andrew achieved nothing, and went back to Venice in autumn. Gregory Kőszegi was first referred to as the Master of the stewards in the virtual ducal court of Andrew in 1287. During the reign of Andrew III, who ascended the Hungarian throne in 1290, Kőszegi served as ispán of Zala County in 1291. Shortly after the signing of Peace of Hainburg, which concluded the brief war between Hungary and Austria and prescribed the destruction of the fortresses that Albert of Austria had seized from them, Kőszegis rose up in open rebellion against Andrew in spring 1292, acknowledging Charles Martel of Anjou, as King of Hungary. His father Charles II of Naples donated Vas and Sopron counties to Ivan and his son Gregory. In September 1296, Gregory was styled as ispán Garics (Podgaric) and Gerzence (Garešnica) lordships by a contemporary document. In the next year, the two forts were handed over to the Diocese of Zagreb.

Gregory shared his father's political orientation in order to establish their independent province at the borderlands between Austria and Hungary. According to Austrian chronicles and annals, he actively participated in the various plundering campaigns and raids against the two realms. The Continuatio Vindobonensis described Gregory as a "very bad man, the most worthless robber", thus, as the chronicle noted, "it is not surprising" that he was killed by a lightning strike in 1297.

== Sources ==
- Skorka, Renáta (2017). "A "mohó farkas" utóda. Egy Kőszegi Habsburg-szolgálatban [The Heir of the "Greedy Wolf". A Kőszegi in the Service of the Habsburg Dukes]". Világtörténet (in Hungarian). 39 (1): 93–124. ISSN 0083-6265.
- Vajk, Ádám (2011). ""Mibe került ezen hűségi levél?" Kőszegi Miklós győri püspöksége és az országos politika ["What did this charter of loyalty cost?" The bishopric of Miklós of Kőszeg and the countrywide politics]". In Nemes, Gábor; Vajk, Ádám (eds.). In labore fructus. Jubileumi tanulmányok Győregyházmegye történetéből (in Hungarian). Győri Egyházmegyei Levéltár. pp. 411–440. ISBN 978-615-5035-01-2.
- Zsoldos, Attila (2011). Magyarország világi archontológiája, 1000–1301 [Secular Archontology of Hungary, 1000–1301] (in Hungarian). História, MTA Történettudományi Intézete. ISBN 978-963-9627-38-3.

Gregory House of Kőszegi Born: ? Died: 1297
Political offices
Preceded by Lucas Péc	Ispán of Zala; 1291	Succeeded by Lucas Péc
