= Andrew Kőszegi =

Hungarian lord

Ispán of Vas
- Reign: 1314–1317; 1321–1324
- Predecessor: Nicholas III Kőszegi (1st term); Nicholas II Kőszegi (2nd term)
- Successor: Nicholas II Kőszegi (1st term); John Kőszegi (2nd term)
- Born: c. 1295
- Died: May/December 1324
- Noble family: House of Kőszegi
- Father: Gregory

Andrew Kőszegi (Hungarian: Kőszegi András; died May/December 1324) was a Hungarian lord in the early 14th century, who was a member of the powerful Kőszegi family. His failed rebellion against Charles I of Hungary in 1317 contributed to the gradual collapse of the family's rule in Transdanubia.

== Family ==
Andrew originated from the Transdanubian branch of the powerful and wealthy Kőszegi family. He was born around 1295, not long before the death of his father Gregory, who was killed by a lightning strike in 1297. Andrew was still referred to as "iuvenis" ("young") in spring 1315, who had just reached adulthood.

Andrew had an elder brother Nicholas III, both of them were grandsons and heirs of the influential lord Ivan Kőszegi, who had established a province in Western Transdanubia independently of the royal power in the previous decades. Nicholas inherited Ivan's power and landholdings in 1308. Andrew was first mentioned by contemporary records in January 1312, when Nicholas confirmed his previously concluded alliance with the House of Habsburg in Fürstenfeld (Hungarian: Fölöstöm), beyond his own person, on behalf of his brother Andrew, his uncle Bishop Nicholas of Győr and the sons of the late Henry, John and Peter the "Duke".

== Rebellions against Charles ==
Nicholas died in early 1314. He was succeeded by Andrew, who clearly stated in one of his charters that he inherited the province from his grandfather then brother "by law". Accordingly, Andrew became hereditary ispán of Vas, Sopron, Zala – and possibly Moson and Győr – counties until his death. He owned various castles in the region, for instance Kőszeg, Óvár, Borostyánkő (today Bernstein, Austria), Sárvár, Tátika and Kabold (today Kobersdorf, Austria), in addition to the Pannonhalma Archabbey. Initially, Andrew remained neutral during the unification war of King Charles I of Hungary against the oligarchs, continuing his brother's policy, who abandoned their grandfather's aggressive anti-royal behavior. According to his own document, Andrew intended to visit the royal court in the summer of 1314, but there is no record about the event.

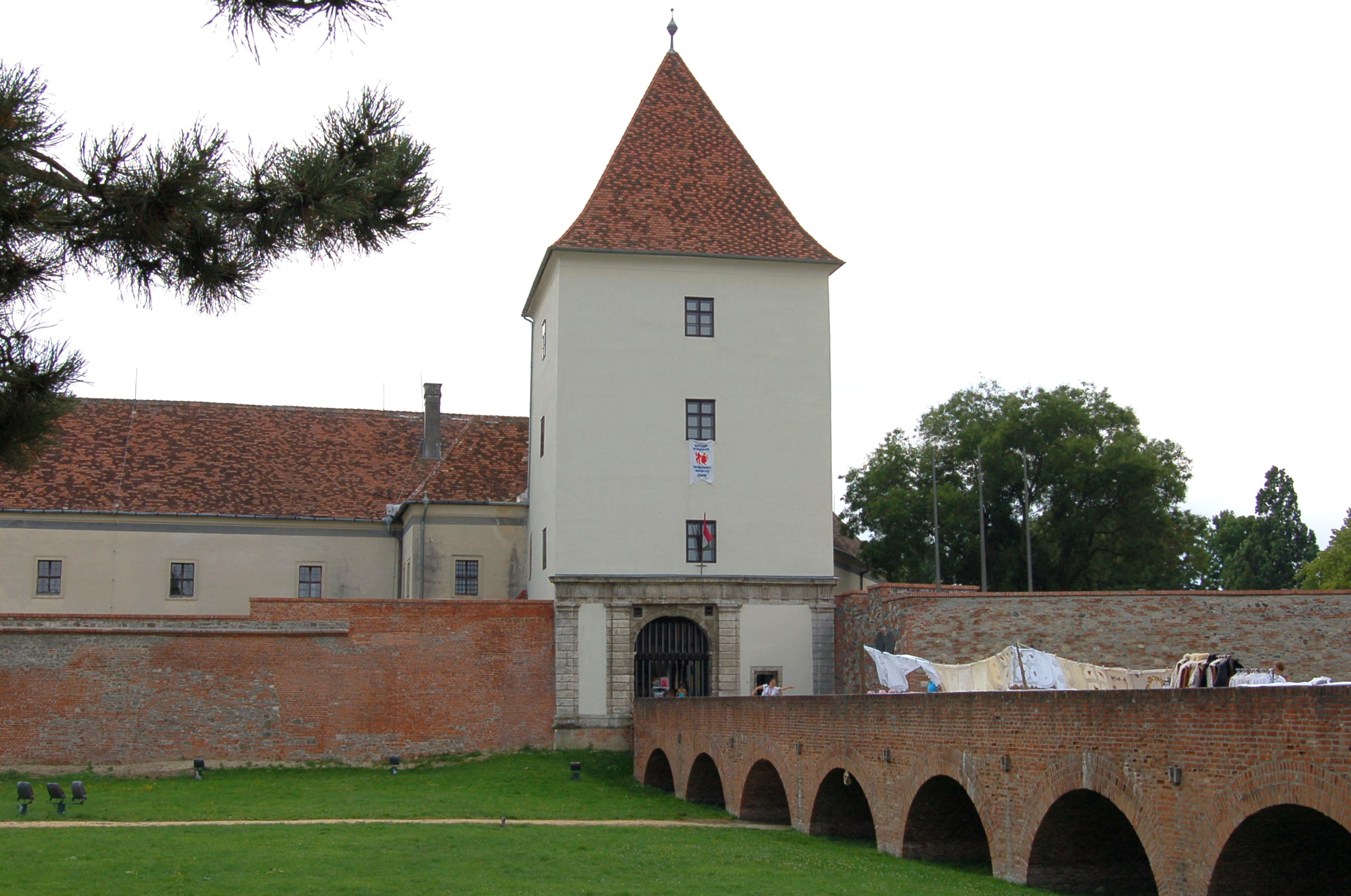
Sárvár Castle was the permanent residence of Andrew Kőszegi until his death

However, soon, Andrew returned to the late Ivan's harsh expansionist policy and plundered his neighbors' landholdings, in order to integrate the some remaining independent lords to his Western Transdanubian province. For instance, his familiaris Solomon the Red destroyed the castle of Resznek, owned by Herbord Reszneki. Andrew seized Szentgyörgy (also called Békavár, lit. "Frog's Castle") from Joachim Péc around the same time. He even extended his influence over some portions of Veszprém County by early 1315. For instance, he arbitrarily occupied the fort of Ugod from the Csáks. When Charles I launched a royal campaign against John and Peter, the late Henry's sons, who governed their province in Southern Transdanubia, Andrew sent his auxiliary troops in order to provide assistance to his second uncles. Charles waged war with the southern Kőszegi dominion again in the first half of 1316, which also affected heavily Andrew's territory. He was unable to help his relatives, because his several familiares pledged allegiance to the king and left his army in the same time, including Alexander Köcski and his kinship, the Nádasd clan. Andrew sent his soldier Solomon the Red with a marauding army to Gerse, where Köcski's brother-in-law Ladislaus Nádasd and his family were brutally massacred. In the same time, Köcski's lands and mills were also plundered and destroyed.

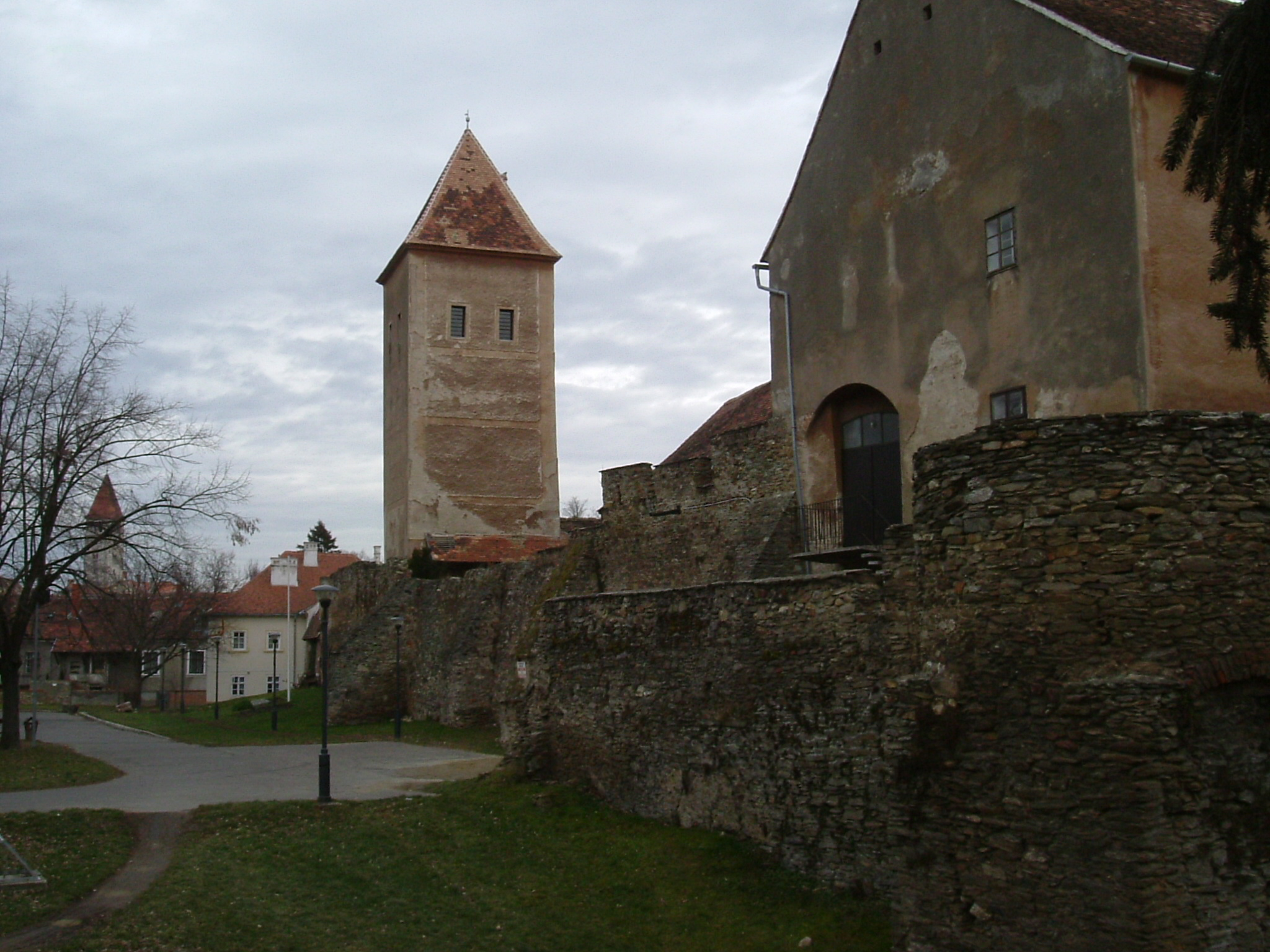
The medieval wall of Kőszeg Castle, owned by Andrew Kőszegi

When Stefan Uroš II Milutin invaded Syrmia, Charles I launched a counter-campaign across the river Száva and seized the fortress of Macsó (present-day Mačva, Serbia) in the winter of 1317. Taking advantage of the king's absent, Andrew Kőszegi attacked the towns of Sopron and Győr, which refused to acknowledge his supremacy, but the burghers successfully repelled the offense with the assistance of the troops of his former familiares, Paul and Lawrence Nagymartoni. Simultaneously Andrew unsuccessfully besieged Léka and Rohonc (present-day Lockenhaus and Rechnitz in Austria, respectively), the castles of his royalist relative Nicholas II Kőszegi, who also participated in the Serbian campaign. Contemporary records and charters in the following period referred to Andrew's forces as "Germans", which implies that he hired number of mercenaries from Austria and Styria. In retaliation, Charles launched a punitive expedition against his territory in the summer of 1317, while Austrian duke Frederick the Fair also attacked from the borderlands. Andrew's dominion collapsed within months (the details of the clashes are unknown); he surrendered to Charles in the royal camp at Komárom in October 1317 (at that moment, the king besieged Matthew Csák's fortress). Charles' cease-fire conditions resulted the dissolution of the extended Kőszegi province in Western Transdanubia; the family was able to retain only Vas and Zala counties, its revenues were handed over to Nicholas II Kőszegi, while royal ispáns were appointed to the other counties, where Andrew lost all of his castles (for instance, Pannonhalma, Kapuvár and Óvár). In contrary to Pál Engel's conclusion, historian Gyula Kristó considered that Andrew's unsuccessful attack against Sopron took place in the summer of 1317, and there were no subsequent clashes between the royal army and Andrew's troops. Kristó argued there is no evidence that Andrew ever held the aforementioned ispánates. In November 1317, King Frederick instructed Austrian noble and ispán of Sopron County Rudolf von Pottendorf, to suspend attacks against Andrew's landholdings.

After his failed insurrection in 1317, Andrew Kőszegi withdrew to the western border. For unknown reasons, he rebelled against Charles I again in the spring of 1319. Thereafter, Alexander Köcski and Nicholas Felsőlendvai led a royal campaign against his remaining dominion. Fulfilling his vengeance, Köcski seized the Kőszegis' six fortresses within months; he overcame Andrew Kőszegi's army at Szalafő, also defeating the Austrian auxiliary troops, thereafter besieged and captured the forts of Kőszeg and Kapronca (present-day Koprivnica, Croatia). According to a royal charter, Nicholas Felsőlendvai captured six Austrian robber barons, who served in Andrew's army. According to historian Renáta Skorka, these events also occurred during Andrew's rebellion in 1317. After that Andrew Kőszegi surrendered to the royal armies and never rebelled again. Charles I did not fully punish him for unknown reasons, for instance, he also returned the castle of Kőszeg to him. When the king crushed the power of Nicholas II Kőszegi in 1321, he appointed Andrew as the new ispán of Vas County. He died in the second half of 1324. His castles and lands were inherited by his much younger uncle, John the "Wolf".

== Sources ==
- Engel, Pál (1988). "Az ország újraegyesítése. I. Károly küzdelmei az oligarchák ellen (1310–1323) [Reunification of the Realm. The Struggles of Charles I Against the Oligarchs (1310–1323)]". Századok (in Hungarian). 122 (1–2). Magyar Történelmi Társulat: 89–146. ISSN 0039-8098.
- Engel, Pál (1996). Magyarország világi archontológiája, 1301–1457, I [Secular Archontology of Hungary, 1301–1457, Volume I] (in Hungarian). História, MTA Történettudományi Intézete. ISBN 963-8312-44-0.
- Kristó, Gyula (2003). "I. Károly király harcai a tartományurak ellen (1310–1323) [The Struggles of Charles I Against the Oligarchs (1310–1323)]". Századok (in Hungarian). 137 (2). Magyar Történelmi Társulat: 297–347. ISSN 0039-8098.
- Skorka, Renáta (2017). "A "mohó farkas" utóda. Egy Kőszegi Habsburg-szolgálatban [The Heir of the "Greedy Wolf". A Kőszegi in the Service of the Habsburg Dukes]". Világtörténet (in Hungarian). 39 (1): 93–124. ISSN 0083-6265.
- Vajk, Ádám (2011). ""Mibe került ezen hűségi levél?" Kőszegi Miklós győri püspöksége és az országos politika ["What did this charter of loyalty cost?" The bishopric of Miklós of Kőszeg and the countrywide politics]". In Nemes, Gábor; Vajk, Ádám (eds.). In labore fructus. Jubileumi tanulmányok Győregyházmegye történetéből (in Hungarian). Győri Egyházmegyei Levéltár. pp. 411–440. ISBN 978-615-5035-01-2.
- Zsoldos, Attila (2010). "A Henrik-fiak: A Héder nembéli Kőszegiek "családi története" [The Henry Sons: The "Family History" of the Kőszegis from the Kindred Héder]". Vasi Szemle (in Hungarian). 64 (6): 651–661. ISSN 0505-0332.

Andrew House of Kőszegi Born: 1290s Died: May/December 1324
Political offices
Preceded by Nicholas III Kőszegi	Ispán of Vas; 1314–1317	Succeeded by Nicholas II Kőszegi
Preceded by Nicholas III Kőszegi	Ispán of Zala; 1314–1317	Succeeded by Nicholas II Kőszegi
Preceded by Nicholas III Kőszegi	Ispán of Sopron; 1314–1317	Succeeded by Rudolf von Pottendorf
Preceded by Nicholas III Kőszegi	Ispán of Moson; 1314–1317	Succeeded by John Hencfi
Preceded by Nicholas III Kőszegi	Ispán of Győr; 1314–1317	Succeeded by Paul Nagymartoni
Preceded by Nicholas II Kőszegi	Ispán of Vas; 1321–1324	Succeeded by John Kőszegi
