= Nicholas III Kőszegi =

14th century Hungarian lord

Nicholas (III) Kőszegi

Master of the treasury
- Reign: 1307; 1311–1314
- Predecessor: Henry Kőszegi (1st term); Matthew Csák (2nd term)
- Successor: Ugrin Csák (1st term); Beke Borsa (2nd term)
- Born: c. 1285
- Died: early 1314
- Noble family: House of Kőszegi
- Father: Gregory

Nicholas (III) Kőszegi (Hungarian: Kőszegi (III.) Miklós; died early 1314) was a Hungarian lord in the early 14th century, who served as Master of the treasury in 1307 and from 1311 to 1314.

== Family ==
Nicholas was born around 1285 into the powerful and wealthy Kőszegi family, as one of the two sons of Gregory. His younger brother was Andrew. His father was killed by a lightning strike in 1297, leaving the child Nicholas as the heir of his grandfather Ivan, who had established a province in Western Transdanubia independently of the royal power. Nicholas had no descendants.

== Career ==
Nicholas first appeared in contemporary records in February 1307, when he was referred to as Master of the treasury in the court of Otto of Bavaria, one of the pretenders to the Hungarian throne, whose aspirations was supported by Ivan Kőszegi. Nicholas lost the dignity still in that year, as Otto was captured and imprisoned by Ladislaus Kán in the following months. Ivan Kőszegi died on 5 April 1308. Nicholas inherited his power and positions; he became hereditary ispán of Vas, Sopron, Zala – and possibly Moson and Győr – counties until his death. He owned various castles in the region, for instance Kőszeg, Borostyánkő (today Bernstein, Austria), Sárvár and Bikug (near Deutschkreutz), in addition to the Pannonhalma Archabbey.

Abandoning the political orientation of his grandfather, Nicholas participated in that Diet in Pest on 27 November 1308, where Otto's rival, Charles of Anjou was unanimously proclaimed king. His uncle, Henry also attended the assembly. In June 1309, Henry Kőszegi confirmed his oath of allegiance to Charles on behalf of himself, his grandnephew Nicholas and their familiares. Historian Attila Zsoldos argues Henry acted as paterfamilias in this capacity, but Nicholas represented the Ivan branch within the Kőszegi kinship. After Henry's death in 1310, Nicholas became head of the family. After Matthew Csák's open face turning against Charles, Nicholas was made Master of the treasury in the spring of 1311, sometimes in March or April. He held the position until his death.

On 23 January 1312, Nicholas Kőszegi confirmed his previously concluded alliance with the House of Habsburg in Fürstenfeld (Hungarian: Fölöstöm), beyond his own person, on behalf of his brother Andrew, his uncle Bishop Nicholas of Győr and the sons of the late Henry, John and Peter "the Duke". In accordance with the document, Nicholas had a meeting with Frederick I, Duke of Austria sometimes earlier in Wiener Neustadt. The document emphasizes that Nicholas and his family were equally committed to serving Charles I too, simultaneously maintaining a good relationship with Frederick the Fair. Nicholas Kőszegi tried to stabilize his power in the borderlands and took a neutral position in Charles' unification war against the provincial lords; he did not send soldiers to the royal army, but did not rebel against the king, when Charles waged war with the powerful oligarch Matthew Csák in the early 1310s. Nicholas died in early 1314, leaving no male descendants. He was succeeded by Andrew, who renewed their grandfather's violent behavior and raids against the royal power, causing the family's downfall in 1317.

== In hagiography ==
The circumstances of Nicholas' death appear in the 15th-century legend of Blessed Maurice Csák, although with many false data and interpretation. Accordingly, Maurice, who related to the Kőszegis from his maternal side, wished to recover his previously abandoned goods in order to donate them to the Virgin Mary monastery, located on an island of the Danube, but "king" Nicholas ["son of George"] refused his request after their conversation [in the autumn of 1313]. In response, Maurice prophesied that Nicholas will die within half a year because of his "harshness". For the specified time, Nicholas fell ill and called "his sons" [sic!], Bishop Nicholas of Győr and Andrew, and ordered them to hand over the goods for the monastery, according to Maurice's request, who predicted his death and thus "he has a holy and prophetic soul".

== Sources ==
- Engel, Pál (1996). Magyarország világi archontológiája, 1301–1457, I [Secular Archontology of Hungary, 1301–1457, Volume I] (in Hungarian). História, MTA Történettudományi Intézete. ISBN 963-8312-44-0.
- Kádár, Tamás (2017). "Harcban a koronáért. (II.) I. Károly (Róbert) király uralkodásának 1306–1310 közötti szakasza [Fight for the Crown. The Reign of Charles I (Robert) from 1306 to 1310]". Történeti Tanulmányok. Acta Universitatis Debreceniensis (in Hungarian). 25: 126–192. ISSN 1217-4602.
- Madas, Edit (2001). "Boldog Csáki Móric élete [Life of Blessed Maurice Csák]". In Madas, Edit; Klaniczay, Gábor (eds.). Legendák és csodák (13–16. század). Szentek a magyar középkorból II (in Hungarian). Osiris Kiadó. pp. 331–341. ISBN 963-389-123-X.
- Markó, László (2006). A magyar állam főméltóságai Szent Istvántól napjainkig: Életrajzi Lexikon [Great Officers of State in Hungary from King Saint Stephen to Our Days: A Biographical Encyclopedia] (in Hungarian). Helikon Kiadó. ISBN 963-547-085-1.
- Skorka, Renáta (2017). "A "mohó farkas" utóda. Egy Kőszegi Habsburg-szolgálatban [The Heir of the "Greedy Wolf". A Kőszegi in the Service of the Habsburg Dukes]". Világtörténet (in Hungarian). 39 (1): 93–124. ISSN 0083-6265.
- Zsoldos, Attila (2010). "A Henrik-fiak: A Héder nembéli Kőszegiek "családi története" [The Henry Sons: The "Family History" of the Kőszegis from the Kindred Héder]". Vasi Szemle (in Hungarian). 64 (6): 651–661. ISSN 0505-0332.

Nicholas III House of Kőszegi Born: 1280s Died: 1314
Political offices
Preceded by Henry Kőszegi	Master of the treasury 1307	Succeeded by Ugrin Csák
Preceded by Matthew Csák	Master of the treasury 1311–1314	Succeeded by Beke Borsa
