= Klenovec Humski =

Coordinates: 46°12′25″N 15°43′41″E

- Village
- Interactive map of Klenovec Humski
- Country: Croatia
- County: Krapina-Zagorje County
- Municipality: Hum na Sutli

Area
  - Total: 2.7 km^{2} (1.0 sq mi)

Population (2021)
  - Total: 337
  - Density: 120/km^{2} (320/sq mi)
- Time zone: UTC+1 (CET)
  - Summer (DST): UTC+2 (CEST)

Klenovec Humski is a village in Croatia.
