= Kőszegi family =

House of Kőszegi
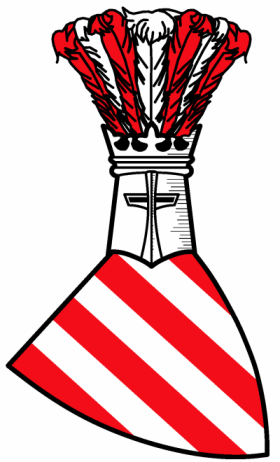
- Parent house: Genus Héder
- Country: Hungary; Croatia
- Founded: c. 1244
- Founder: Henry I
- Final ruler: Peter II
- Dissolution: 1339
- Cadet branches: House of Rohonci; House of Bernstein (Austria); House of Tamási; House of Herceg

The Kőszegi (Croatian: Gisingovci) was a noble family in the Kingdom of Hungary and the Kingdom of Croatia in the 13th and 14th centuries. The ancestor of the family, Henry the Great, descended from the gens ("clan") Héder. Henry's paternal great-grandfather was the clan's co-founder Wolfer.

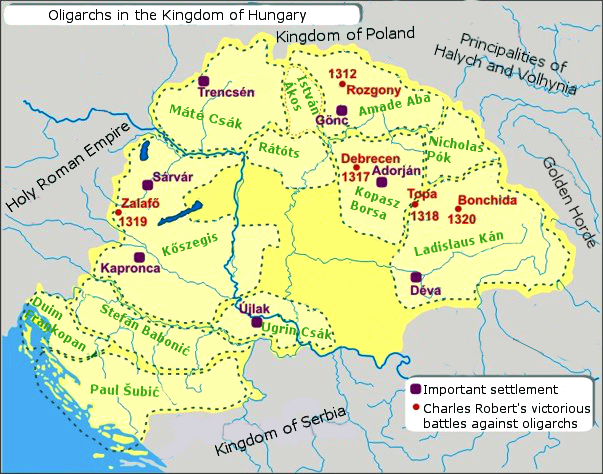
The provinces ruled by the "oligarchs" (powerful lords) in the early 14th century

== Notable members ==
- Henry I the Great (fl. 1237–1274), Palatine of Hungary
  - Nicholas I (fl. 1266–1299), Palatine of Hungary
    - Nicholas II (fl. 1314–1332), Master of the horse, ancestor of the Rohonci family
    - John, ancestor of the Béri family
  - Ivan (fl. 1266–1308), Palatine of Hungary
    - Gregory (fl. 1287–1297), Master of the stewards for the Prince
      - Nicholas III (fl. 1308–1313), Master of the treasury
      - Andrew (fl. 1311–1324), ispán of Vas County; last member who bore the Kőszegi name
    - a daughter, married Dominic Csák (?)
    - John the "Wolf" (fl. 1325–1382), ancestor of the Bernstein family
    - (?) Nicholas (illegitimate; fl. 1308–1336), Bishop of Győr
  - Peter I (fl. 1275–1289), Bishop of Veszprém
  - Henry II (fl. 1278–1310), Ban of Slavonia; married daughter of Mojs II
    - John (fl. 1310–1327), Master of the horse, ancestor of the Tamási family
    - Peter II (fl. 1310–1353), ispán of Bodrog County, ancestor of the Herceg de Szekcső family
    - a daughter (fl. 1300), married Turcho Morosini
  - a daughter, married Demetrius Csák

== Sources ==
- Kristó, Gyula (1983). "A Kőszegiek kiskirálysága [The Petty Kingdom of the Kőszegis]". Tanulmányok az Árpád-korról (in Hungarian). Magvető Könyvkiadó. pp. 241–268. ISBN 963-271-890-9.
- Zsoldos, Attila (2010). "A Henrik-fiak: A Héder nembéli Kőszegiek "családi története" [The Henry Sons: The "Family History" of the Kőszegis from the Kindred Héder]". Vasi Szemle (in Hungarian). 64 (6): 651–661. ISSN 0505-0332.
