= Oštrc =

- Location in Slovenia
- Coordinates: 45°49′54.07″N 15°26′27.98″E
- Country: Slovenia
- Traditional region: Lower Carniola
- Statistical region: Lower Sava
- Municipality: Kostanjevica na Krki

Area
  - Total: 1.12 km^{2} (0.43 sq mi)
- Elevation: 296.6 m (973 ft)

Population (2002)
  - Total: 152
- Postal code: 8311

Oštrc (pronounced [ɔˈʃtəɾts]; in older sources also Osterc, German: Osterz) is a village in the foothills of the Gorjanci Hills in the Municipality of Kostanjevica na Krki in eastern Slovenia. The area is part of the traditional region of Lower Carniola. It is now included in the Lower Sava Statistical Region.

The local church is dedicated to Mary Magdalene and belongs to the Parish of Kostanjevica na Krki. It is a 17th-century Baroque building extensively rebuilt in the 19th century.
