= John Péc =

Early 14th century Hungarian lord

Ispán of Veszprém
- Reign: 1295
- Predecessor: Lőrinte II Lőrinte
- Successor: Lőrinte II Lőrinte
- Died: 1321/27
- Noble family: gens Péc
- Father: Denis

John from the kindred Péc (Hungarian: Péc nembeli János; died between 1321 and 1327) was a Hungarian lord at the turn of the 13th and 14th centuries, who served as ispán of Veszprém County in 1295.

== Biography ==
John originated from the Zala branch of the extended gens (clan) Péc, which had large-scale possessions in several counties of Transdanubia, in addition to other parts of the Kingdom of Hungary. His father was Denis, an influential baron and skilled military leader during the second half of the 13th century. John had an unidentified sister, who married Stephen Hahót.

John first appears in contemporary records in 1292. He was a confidant of King Andrew III's mother Queen mother Tomasina Morosini, who governed the southern parts of the kingdom as Duchess of Slavonia. John served his lady as Master of the cupbearers in her court. Simultaneously, he also functioned as ispán of Veszprém County. By then, inheriting the Marócsa (present-day Moravče, Croatia) lordship, he owned the castle of Zelna (today ruins in Sveti Ivan Zelina, Croatia), which was built by his father in the previous decades. His castellan was a certain Paul ("Churkan") in that same year. John is last mentioned by sources in 1321. He died childless. His cousin and closest living relative, Nicholas Ludbregi inherited the castle of Zelna (Zelina) from him, according to a document issued in 1327, which suggests, John had died by then.

== Sources ==
- Engel, Pál (1996). Magyarország világi archontológiája, 1301–1457, I. [Secular Archontology of Hungary, 1301–1457, Volume I] (in Hungarian). História, MTA Történettudományi Intézete. ISBN 963-8312-44-0.
- Kádár, Tamás (2018). "Egy figyelemre méltó Dráva vidéki főúr a 13. század második feléből: Péc nembeli György fia Dénes nádor és országbíró közéleti pályája [A Remarkable Lord from the Dráva Region in the Second Half of the 13th Century: The Public Career of Palatine and Judge Royal Denis, son of George from the Clan Péc]". Somogy Megye Múltjából (in Hungarian). 45–46: 5–19. ISSN 1419-8010.
- Zsoldos, Attila (2011). Magyarország világi archontológiája, 1000–1301 [Secular Archontology of Hungary, 1000–1301] (in Hungarian). História, MTA Történettudományi Intézete. ISBN 978-963-9627-38-3.

John Genus Péc Born: ? Died: after 1321
Political offices
Preceded by Lőrinte II Lőrinte	Ispán of Veszprém; 1295	Succeeded by Lőrinte II Lőrinte
