= Lucas I Péc =

Lucas (I) Péc

Master of the cupbearers
- Reign: 1229–1230
- Predecessor: Julius Kán
- Successor: Stephen Csák
- Noble family: gens Péc
- Issue: George; Mark I Lucas II

Lucas (I) from the kindred Péc (Hungarian: Péc nembeli (I.) Lukács) was a Hungarian noble in the first third of the 13th century, who served as Master of the cupbearers from 1229 to 1230.

== Family ==
Lucas I is the earliest known member of the gens (clan) Péc, which had large-scale possessions in several counties of Transdanubia, in addition to other parts of the Kingdom of Hungary. They originated from Sokoró Hills (Győr County), their ancient clan estate laid in present-day Felpéc and Kajárpéc. Based on the clan's coat-of-arms, it is possible that Lucas was a knight from Western Europe, who arrived to Hungary during the early reign of Andrew II of Hungary. For his military service, he was granted lands in Győr County and the surrounding regions.

Lucas I had three sons: George served as ispán of Zala County from 1243 to 1244; Mark I, who was forefather of the Marcali, Berzencei and Szentgyörgyi noble families; and Lucas II (also known as Lucas the Great).

== Identification ==
There is a scholarly debate on the difficulty of the identification of Hungarian nobles with the given name "Lucas", who were active in the 1230s. 19th-century historian Mór Wertner considered all of them as a single person in his various academic works, albeit with various sturdiness. He claimed that all of relevant data refer to a certain Lucas, son of Hippolytus, who is mentioned by a charter in 1206. Wertner connected this individual to the Péc kindred. Subsequently, he slightly modified his viewpoint, and considered Lucas, who functioned as ispán of Hont County, was "probably different person". Historian Attila Zsoldos analyzed further the question: he separated Lucas, the ispán of the Bakony royal forest too, as its office-holders came from a lower social status in the era. Furthermore, as Zsoldos denoted, the ispán of Moson County was certainly different person from the ispán of Hont County, as they both appeared in the same royal charter in 1239. Attila Zsoldos then considered, there were four (less likely three) different office-bearer nobles with the given name Lucas in the first third of the 13th century:

1. Lucas, who belonged to the court of King Andrew II. He served as Master of the cupbearers from 1229 to 1230, beside his position of ispán of Bars County. Possibly he is identical with that Lucas, who briefly functioned as ispán of Pozsony County in 1235. Several historians, including Attila Zsoldos and Tamás Kádár considered this baron might be identical with Lucas I Péc, who rose to the Hungarian elite during his decades of service in the court of Andrew II, but rapidly lost political influence, when Béla IV of Hungary ascended the Hungarian throne in 1235.
2. Lucas, who was a confidant of Duke Béla, who had long opposed his father's land grants and policy. He was Ban of Severin (which belonged to the duke's domain) in 1233, following his predecessor Buzád Hahót's retirement. He was present at the forest of Bereg on 22 August 1233, when Duke Béla took an oath to the agreement concluded two days earlier between his father and the Holy See. It is plausible that Julius Rátót succeeded him as ban by 27 November 1233. After Béla's coronation as Hungarian king, he served as ispán of Moson County between 1235 and 1240. It is plausible he was killed during the First Mongol invasion of Hungary.
3. Lucas, who came from a lower social status (possibly royal servant), and functioned as count of the Bakony royal forest from 1232 to 1233.
4. Lucas, who was ispán of Hont County from 1237 to 1239. It is possible that he is identical with #1 Lucas (thus plausibly Lucas Péc), who was forced to be satisfied with this relatively insignificant position after Béla IV's enthronement.

== Sources ==
- Kádár, Tamás (2018). "Egy figyelemre méltó Dráva vidéki főúr a 13. század második feléből: Péc nembeli György fia Dénes nádor és országbíró közéleti pályája [A Remarkable Lord from the Dráva Region in the Second Half of the 13th Century: The Public Career of Palatine and Judge Royal Denis, son of George from the Clan Péc]". Somogy Megye Múltjából (in Hungarian). 45–46: 5–19. ISSN 1419-8010.
- Zsoldos, Attila (2011). Magyarország világi archontológiája, 1000–1301 [Secular Archontology of Hungary, 1000–1301] (in Hungarian). História, MTA Történettudományi Intézete. ISBN 978-963-9627-38-3.

Lucas I Genus Péc Born: ? Died: ?
Political offices
Preceded by Julius Kán	Master of the cupbearers 1229–1230	Succeeded by Stephen Csák
