= Benedict Péc =

13th-century nobleman

- Died: after 1274
- Noble family: gens Péc
- Issue: James
- Father: Lucas II

Benedict from the kindred Péc (Hungarian: Péc nembeli Benedek; died after 1274) was a Hungarian noble and soldier, who fought against the Bohemians in the early 1270s.

== Life ==
Benedict originated from the Zala branch of the extended gens (clan) Péc, which had large-scale possessions in several counties of Transdanubia, in addition to other parts of the Kingdom of Hungary. He was a son of Lucas II (or Lucas "the Great"). His brother was Ladislaus, ancestor of the Kustáni family. It is possible that Lucas IV, ancestor of the Ibrányi family was also their brother.

According to the narration of the royal charter of Ladislaus IV of Hungary (1274), Benedict actively participated in the Bohemian–Hungarian War which took place in the previous year. In the first phase of the war, Benedict successfully spied out the army of King Ottokar II of Bohemia. Under the banner of Ivan Kőszegi, Benedict defended the Hungarian border in Sopron County. Benedict fought in the rearguard near Győr in August, led by his cousin Denis Péc. Thereafter, again in Kőszegi's army, he fought in Pereszteg and Lós, harassing the invading Bohemian army with hit-and-run tactics. During the skirmish, he defeated and captured a lieutenant of the army of Bruno von Schauenburg, Bishop of Olomouc. Following that Benedict joined to the troops of Denis Péc, who defeated a Moravian army at the walls of Detrekő Castle (today ruins near Plavecké Podhradie, Slovakia) in October 1273.

For his military service, Benedict was granted the land of Vindornyaszőlős in Zala County by King Ladislaus in 1274. His descendants adopted the surname "Szőlősi" after the village. Benedict had a son James, who had a son Lucas, the last male member of the family (fl. 1336–1353) and a daughter Chuna, who married Stephen Bokodi from the gens (clan) Héder.

== Sources ==
- Karácsonyi, János (1901). A magyar nemzetségek a XIV. század közepéig. II. kötet [The Hungarian genera until the middle of the 14th century, Vol. 2] (in Hungarian). Hungarian Academy of Sciences.
- Kristó, Gyula, ed. (2000). Középkori históriák oklevelekben (1002–1410) [Medieval Stories in Charters (1002–1410)] (in Hungarian). Szegedi Középkorász Műhely. ISBN 963-482-423-4.
