= Péc (genus) =

Genus (gens) Péc
- Country: Kingdom of Hungary
- Founded: 1200s
- Founder: Lucas I
- Dissolution: 14th century
- Cadet branches: a, Zala branch: House of Nevnai; House of Ludbregi; House of Marcali; House of Berzencei; House of Szentgyörgyi; House of Kustáni; House of Szőlősi; b, Apponyi branch: House of Őri; House of Apponyi; c, Ibrányi branch: House of Ibrányi

Péc or Pécz (also Peech or Pech) was the name of a gens (Latin for 'clan'; nemzetség in Hungarian) in the Kingdom of Hungary. The powerful and illustrious Marcali and Apponyi noble families descended from this kindred. The clan had large-scale possessions in several counties of Transdanubia, in addition to Slavonia and other parts of the Kingdom of Hungary.

== History and family tree ==
=== Zala branch ===
The clan originated from Sokoró Hills, in the southern region of Győr County, their ancient clan estates laid in present-day Felpéc and Kajárpéc. The earliest known member of the kindred was Lucas I, who lived in the early 13th century. He is apparently the founder of the clan too. Based on the clan's coat-of-arms (narrow silver stripe in blue shield), it is possible that Lucas was a knight from Western Europe, who arrived to Hungary during the early reign of Andrew II of Hungary. For his military service, he was granted lands in Győr County and the surrounding regions. Depending on his origin (German or French), Lucas might have come to the country as an accompanist of either Gertrude of Merania (1205) or Yolanda de Courtenay (1215), the first and second spouse of Andrew II, respectively. His career and life is difficult to outline: it is presumable that he is identical with that Lucas, who served as Master of the cupbearers in the royal court from 1229 to 1230.

Lucas' eldest son was George, who owned Ludbreg sometimes before 1248. Ludbreg later became a residence of his son Peter, who erected a castle above the village and adopted his surname after his lands' centre. This branch died out with George's grandson Nicholas Ludbregi in 1357, thereafter Ludbreg and other lands became the property of Ban John Csúz and his descendants. The most powerful member of the kindred was George's another son Denis. Initially, he was a confidant of rex iunior Stephen, but later joined the partisans of the elderly Béla IV of Hungary. He actively participated in the military campaigns against Austria and Bohemia. He served as Palatine of Hungary and other high-ranking positions several times during the era of feudal anarchy. His son, John was ispán of Veszprém County as a confidant of Queen Mother Tomasina Morosini in 1295, while his unidentified daughter married Stephen Hahót. Through their only son Nicholas, they were ancestors of the powerful Bánfi (Bánffy) de Alsólendva noble family. George's third son was Serfesd, who owned Nevna (or Névna), present-day Levanjska Varoš in Croatia. His only son Ladislaus Nevnai held estates in Valkó and Požega counties, including Orjava (today Orljavac, Croatia), and was considered one of the richest landowners of the region. He fathered two daughters, Catherine and an unidentified girl. Their marriages to Nicholas Treutel and Andrew Garai, respectively, have prompted the rise of the Treutel kinship and the Palatinal branch of the Garai family. Ladislaus Nevnai handed over his estate of Nevna to his son-in-law Nicholas Treutel in 1324. It is presumable, he died shortly thereafter without male descendants, ending the Nevnai family line after two generations.

George's younger brother was Mark I, who appeared in contemporary documents in the period between 1240 and 1245. Alongside two other local nobles, he unsuccessfully filed a lawsuit for the ownership of some portions of Kajár (present-day Kajárpéc) in 1240; Béla IV ruled in favor of the Bakonybél Abbey, referring to St. Ladislaus' royal charters from the late 11th century. He had five sons; Gregory was one of the military leaders of the Bulgarian campaign in 1266. He was Ban of Barancs and Kucsó in 1272–73, then Judge royal in 1288. It is plausible that he built the castle of Szentgyörgy in order to protect his landholdings against the Kőszegi family. However they besieged and captured the fort from Gregory's only son Joachim around 1315. Through his only son Stephen, Joachim was the forefather of the illustrious Marcali family, which became prominent in the 15th century. The family died out in 1487. Mark I's second son Mark II (fl. 1275) remained insignificant member of the clan. His granddaughters' filial quarter was divided between his brothers' surviving branches in 1349. The third son, Apor was considered an influential baron at the turn of the 13th and 14th centuries, during the era of Interregnum. He had no descendants. Stephen I was the ancestor of the Berzencei (or Musinai) family and its cadet branches, the Lorántfis and Sándorfis. Lucas III served as ispán of Zala County from 1289 to 1291 and in 1298. He and his brother Apor besieged and captured Tátika Castle (located near Zalaszántó), which belonged to the property of the Diocese of Veszprém. Thereafter, Lucas and his offspring were sometimes called with the title "of Tátika". However the castle was lost to the Kőszegi family by 1314, when Andrew Kőszegi owned the fort. Lucas had five sons; one of them Apor took the Szentgyörgyi surname, and became the first member of that short-lived family.

- Lucas I, possibly Master of the cupbearers (1229–30)
  - George (fl. 1232–56), ispán of Zala County (1243–44)
    - Denis (fl. 1256–85; d. before 1288), Palatine of Hungary (1273–74, 1277–78, 1283–84)
      - John (fl. 1292–1321; d. before 1327), ispán of Veszprém County (1295)
      - a daughter ∞ Stephen Hahót
    - Serfesd Nevnai
      - Ladislaus Nevnai (fl. 1284–1324) ∞ Yolanda Kórógyi
        - Catherine (fl. 1324) ∞ Nicholas Treutel
        - a daughter ∞ Andrew Garai
    - Peter Ludbregi (fl. 1278)
      - Nicholas Ludbregi (fl. 1317–57†) ∞ Tetis Bednyai
  - Mark I (fl. 1240–45)
    - Gregory (fl. 1266–96 or 1309), Judge royal (1288)
      - Joachim (fl. 1311–21), ancestor of the Marcali family
    - Mark II (fl. 1275)
      - Roland
        - daughters (fl. 1341)
    - Apor (fl. 1280–1307†), Palatine of Hungary (1298–99, 1304–07)
    - Stephen I ("Lég"; fl. 1289–96), ancestor of the Berzencei family
    - Lucas III (also Lucas of Tátika; fl. 1289–98), ispán of Zala County (1289–91, 1298)
      - Desiderius (fl. 1311–60)
      - Apor Szentgyörgyi (fl. 1341–60)
      - Stephen II (fl. 1341–53)
      - Egidius (fl. 1341–53)
      - Nicholas (fl. 1341–53)
  - Lucas II (also Lucas the Great)
    - Ladislaus Kustáni (fl. 1274)
    - Benedict Szőlősi (fl. 1274)
    - Lucas IV (?), see Ibrányi branch below

=== Apponyi branch ===
- Ivanka (fl. 1250)
  - Aladar (1294†), first member of the Őri (then Apponyi) family
  - Ladislaus (also Ladislaus of Hrussó; fl. 1295–1317), castellan of Privigye (today Prievidza, Slovakia; 1308)
  - Peter I (fl. 1295)
    - Michael (fl. 1317–26)
    - Stephen (fl. 1317–26)
    - Peter II (fl. 1323–24)
  - John (fl. 1295–1333)

== Sources ==
- Árvai, Tünde (2013). "A házasságok szerepe a Garaiak hatalmi törekvéseiben [The role of marriages in the Garais' attempts to rise]". In Fedeles, Tamás; Font, Márta; Kiss, Gergely (eds.). Kor-Szak-Határ (in Hungarian). Pécsi Tudományegyetem. pp. 103–118. ISBN 978-963-642-518-0.
- Engel, Pál (1996). Magyarország világi archontológiája, 1301–1457, I. [Secular Archontology of Hungary, 1301–1457, Volume I] (in Hungarian). História, MTA Történettudományi Intézete. ISBN 963-8312-44-0.
- Kádár, Tamás (2018). "Egy figyelemre méltó Dráva vidéki főúr a 13. század második feléből: Péc nembeli György fia Dénes nádor és országbíró közéleti pályája [A Remarkable Lord from the Dráva Region in the Second Half of the 13th Century: The Public Career of Palatine and Judge Royal Denis, son of George from the Clan Péc]". Somogy Megye Múltjából (in Hungarian). 45–46: 5–19. ISSN 1419-8010.
- Karácsonyi, János (1901). A magyar nemzetségek a XIV. század közepéig. II. kötet [The Hungarian genera until the middle of the 14th century, Vol. 2] (in Hungarian). Hungarian Academy of Sciences.
- Markó, László (2006). A magyar állam főméltóságai Szent Istvántól napjainkig: Életrajzi Lexikon [Great Officers of State in Hungary from King Saint Stephen to Our Days: A Biographical Encyclopedia] (in Hungarian). Helikon Kiadó. ISBN 963-208-970-7.
- Vikár, Tibor (1995). "Beszélő múlt: A Péc nemzetség története [Talkative Past: The History of the Péc Clan]". Kispad (in Hungarian). 5 (3). Archived from the original on 2013-11-03.
- Zsoldos, Attila (2007). Családi ügy: IV. Béla és István ifjabb király viszálya az 1260-as években [A family affair: The Conflict between Béla IV and Junior King Stephen in the 1260s] (in Hungarian). História, MTA Történettudományi Intézete. ISBN 978-963-9627-15-4.
- Zsoldos, Attila (2011). Magyarország világi archontológiája, 1000–1301 [Secular Archontology of Hungary, 1000–1301] (in Hungarian). História, MTA Történettudományi Intézete. ISBN 978-963-9627-38-3.
