= Lőrinte II Lőrinte =

Hungarian nobleman

Lőrinte (II) Lőrinte

Ispán of Veszprém
- Reign: 1291–1292; 1298–1302
- Predecessor: Stephen Rátót (1st term); John Péc (2nd term)
- Successor: John Péc (1st term); Stephen Kéki (2nd term)
- Born: c. 1242
- Died: after 1342
- Noble family: gens Lőrinte
- Spouse: N Csák
- Issue: Nicholas; Thomas Essegvári; John; Beke Csékúti
- Father: Saul

Lőrinte (II) from the kindred Lőrinte (Hungarian: Lőrinte nembeli (II.) Lőrinte; died after 1342) was a Hungarian nobleman in the second half of the 13th century and early 14th century, who served as ispán of Veszprém County from 1291 to 1292 and from 1298 to 1302. He was the ancestor of the Essegvári family.

== Family and early life ==
Lőrinte (also Leurente or Leurenthe) was born around 1242 into the namesake gens (clan) Lőrinte, as the son of comes Saul. The Lőrinte clan possessed landholdings in Veszprém County.

The young Lőrinte entered the service of Duke Stephen, the eldest son and heir of Béla IV of Hungary. Since they were roughly the same age, Lőrinte may have been brought up together with the prince. It is plausible he belonged to the ducal court, when Stephen governed the Duchy of Styria from 1258 to 1260. During that time, Zala County and the Bakony royal forest, where Lőrinte and his kinship possessed landholdings, were attached to Stephen's duchy. Whether he actively supported the duke during his civil war in 1264–1265 against his father Béla IV, is unknown. It is certain that he did not take up arms against Stephen.

Sometime in the second half of the 1270s, Lőrinte married an unidentified daughter of Mark Csák. Prior to that, she was the wife of James Bána, ancestor of the Cseszneky family. The Csáks were one of the most powerful clans in Hungary during that time, and were the strongest pillars of the reign of Stephen V. The marriage of Lőrinte and his wife produced four sons: Nicholas, Thomas, John and Beke. Thomas was progenitor of the Essegvári (or Segvári) family, while the Csékútis descended from Beke.

== Career ==
Stephen V ascended the Hungarian throne in 1270. The internal conflict and mutual clashes along the Austrian and Styrian borders resulted a large-scale invasion of Hungary by Ottokar II of Bohemia in the spring of 1271. Crossing the river Morava, the Bohemians besieged and captured Pressburg (present-day Bratislava, Slovakia) in April 1271. Lőrinte and his familiares were among the defenders. He and his nine servants were captured, while four others – including his two relatives Lampert and John – were killed during the siege, where Lőrinte was seriously injured too. They were held captive for almost a year until Lőrinte paid his unprecedentedly high ransom of 1,500 marks (~350–420 kg silver), while his nine familiares had to pay 300 marks altogether. Lőrinte was forced to sell his several estates and chattels to generate the sum.

Thereafter, he and his escort returned to Hungary. Stephen V, three days before his death, rewarded Lőrinte for his loyalty and to compensate his losses on 3 August 1272. He was granted royal estates Erdőberénd (today Tósokberénd, a borough of Ajka), Gajdosbogdán (land of the royal trumpeters) and ducal estate Bogdán (today both are boroughs of Noszlop) in Veszprém County. In addition, the king confirmed his ownership over Örs and Halimba, which his father Saul was granted by Béla IV. Lőrinte permitted the ducal folks of Bogdán to live the estate with their chattels, if that is their intention. However, they returned within a brief time and Lőrinte granted hospes privilege them in April 1275, which guaranteed the maintenance of their free legal status and community. The document took an example of the village Csöl, whose inhabitants were granted the same privilege from their landlord Palatine Roland Rátót. In addition to his estates in Veszprém County, Lőrinte also possessed landholdings in Zala County. He was mentioned among the neighboring lords around Vindornyaszőlős in 1274 (when Benedict Péc was granted that estate).

The activity of Lőrinte during the reign of Ladislaus IV of Hungary (r. 1272–1290), which marked the beginning of the era of feudal anarchy, is unknown. He swore loyalty to Andrew III of Hungary, who ascended the throne in 1290. Lőrinte bore the honorary title of magister since the 1290s. Lőrinte is first styled as ispán of Veszprém County in October 1291. In this capacity, he enrolled the Bakonybél Abbey to the ownership over Tagyon in Zala County in January 1292, upon the instruction of Andrew III. Lőrinte was replaced as ispán by John Péc in 1295 at the latest. In 1297, Pope Boniface VIII mentioned Lőrinte among those lords, who unlawfully seized possessions from the Pannonhalma Abbey. He was re-installed as ispán of Veszprém County by July 1298, when he was present in that national diet, where Albertino Morosini, King Andrew's maternal uncle, was accorded the status of a Hungarian nobleman. In early 1299, Lőrinte was involved in a lawsuit before the cathedral chapter of Veszprém against a certain Stephen, son of Paul, who murdered his relative Beled and looted his estate. In accordance with the verdict of vice-judge royal Stephen in February 1299, Stephen, son of Paul had to pay a fine of 30 marks to Lőrinte.

A clash took place between castle warriors of Queen Agnes and some nobles of Szörcsök in September 1298. Lőrinte and his four noble judges – Matthias Örsi, Heym Jutasi, Donatus and Killian – ruled in favor of the castle warriors accusing the nobles of having attacked, beaten, and plundered the queen's subjects. However, the nobles, appearing before the court of vice-judge royal Stephen, accused Lőrinte and his two judges Matthias and Heym of knowingly falsifying the verdict without the consent of Donatus and Killian. As a result, the plaintiffs and defendants were summoned to the king's court in May 1299. There, both sides presented the charter claimed to be forgery, as well as the one declared to be genuine. The nobles of Szörcsök also presented a letter, written by Donatus and Killian, in which the two noble judges requested Andrew III not to believe the plaintiffs' document because "it was authorized against their will, fraudulently, and not with their seals". Vice-judge royal Stephen summoned Lőrinte and all four noble judges to the king's court to June 1299. The ispán and the four judges did not appear in person, but declared in a letter that the aforementioned letter was a forgery. Vice-judge royal Stephen and his fellow judges sentenced the nobles of Szörcsök to death and confiscation of their properties in July 1299. Two-thirds of the confiscated estates belonged to the vice-judge royal, and one-third to the queen as plaintiff, who later bought the other portion of Szörcsök too from vice-judge royal Stephen too. Lőrinte was instructed to enroll Queen Agnes to the ownership of her new possession.

== During the Interregnum ==
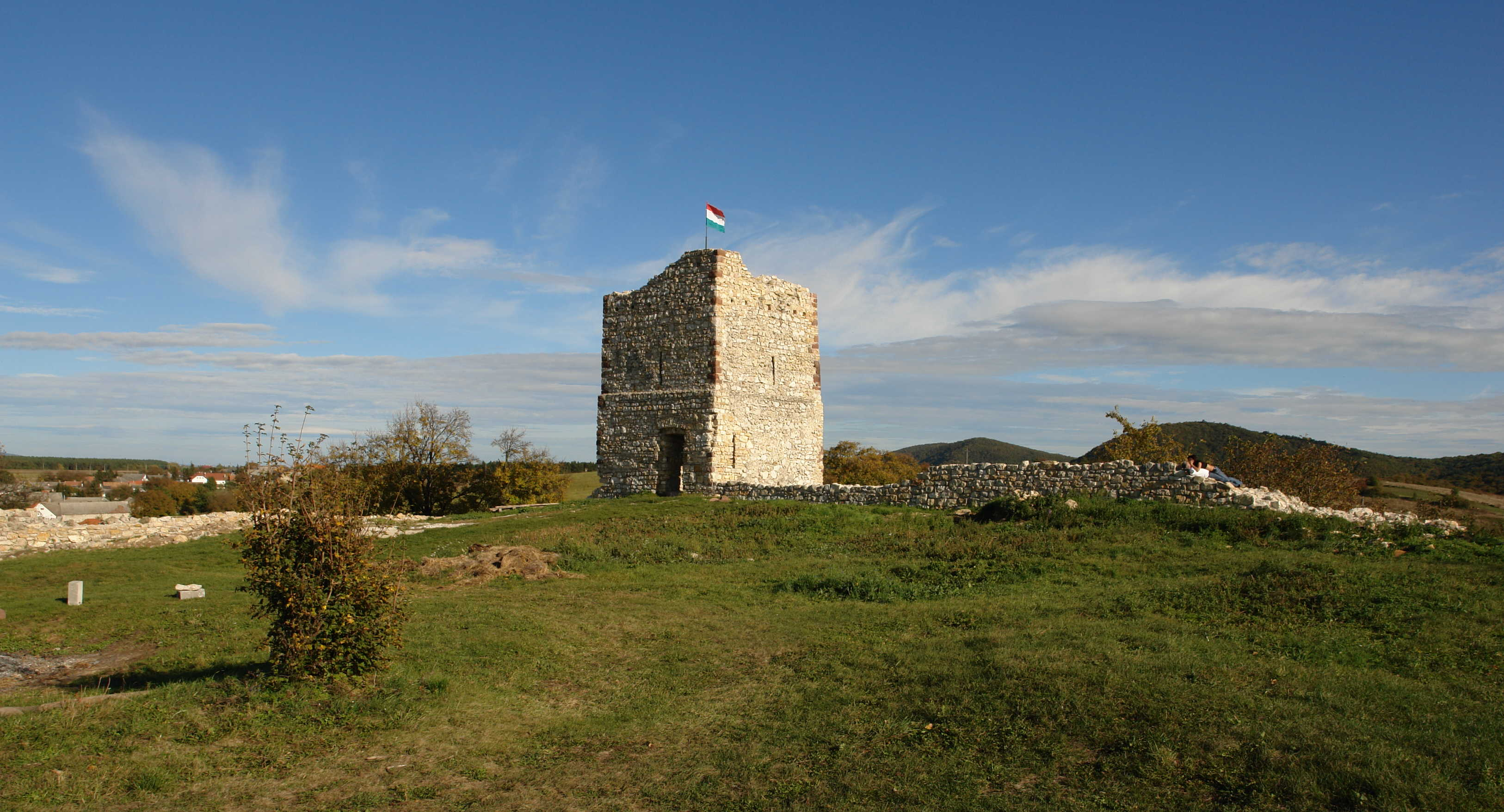
The ruins of Essegvár in Bánd

According to a verdict from October 1301, Lőrinte and his sons had servants, who lived in Somogy County and who allegedly were complicit in a looting. Lőrinte retained his position of ispán of Veszprém County for a while after the death of Andrew III and extinction of the Árpád dynasty. He is mentioned in this capacity in August 1302, when he was represented by one of his sons Nicholas in a lawsuit. It is unknown how long Lőrinte held the position that became nominal by that time, because the closest data is only known when Stephen Kéki, Bishop of Veszprém received a perpetual countship over Veszprém County in 1313. The cathedral chapter of Veszprém complained in April 1308 that Lőrinte and his sons unlawfully seized their estate Billege, but due to their limited financial resources, they are unable to initiate a lawsuit to recover the possession.

In 1309, Nicholas Igmánd, who had no descendants, donated the castle Essegvár (or Segvár, laid in Bánd) to his "closest relatives" Lőrinte and his four sons. Nicholas stated they are, anyway, entitled to a daughters' quarter after all his inherited and acquired property, which implies that he was a possible son of Lőrinte's unidentified sister. With this contract, the Lőrintes also acquired the villages Bánd, Billege, Tótvázsony, Kismelked in Veszprém County, Igmánd in Komárom County and Zics in Somogy County along the right bank of Danube on the condition that if Nicholas were to lose his recently acquired estates in Cisdanubia (in the Tisza region), Lőrinte and his sons owe to return the part of the castle together with the entire part of the aforementioned estates to him or his future potential descendants. If Nicholas dies without an heir, all his remaining property also belongs to Lőrinte and his family. Thereafter, Essegvár became the new seat of the Lőrinte clan, adopting the Essegvári (or Segvári) surname in the 14th century.

During the era of Interregnum, Lőrinte supported the claim of Charles I of Hungary, along with his brother-in-law Stephen Csák. Similarly to the other lords of the region, this political position came up against the violent Kőszegi family, who extended their influence over whole Transdanubia in the 1300s. John Kőszegi besieged and occupied Essegvár from Lőrinte in 1314, as part of an extensive campaign in that year. János Karácsonyi incorrectly attributed this siege to Ivan Kőszegi (John's uncle) and the year 1304, in connection with an unknown castle (since Essegvár became a property of the Lőrintes only in 1309). After the siege, Lőrinte was captured and severely tortured, when he was tied to a horse's tail and dragged along the castle wall. Although some historians wrote about Lőrinte's execution in this regard, he actually survived the ordeal.

== Later life ==
Charles I defeated the oligarchic provinces one after another, including the Kőszegis' territory. The Essegváris regained the castle of Essegvár within years, Thomas was referred to as owner of the fort already in early 1318. After his torture, Lőrinte appears only sporadically in the sources, appears only sporadically in the sources, in parallel with the fact that his adult sons Thomas and Beke took over the management of the family estates (usually with violent actions and acts of domination). In October 1322, he requested the judges of Veszprém County to investigate a looting committed by Nicholas Igmánd against his son Thomas, while they were in litigation with each other over the castle Essegvár and the surrounding estates. Lőrinte lived in Vöröstó, when he submitted this request. In the next year, in April 1323, Lőrinte was involved in a lawsuit against the Ajkai family, who allegedly burnt the house of him and his servants. The county court ruled in favor of Lőrinte and Thomas in July 1324, confiscating the properties of Nicholas and John Ajkai. On behalf of his father and his brothers, Thomas requested Charles I to confirm the donation of letter of the late Stephen V in May 1325.

Lőrinte lived a very long life, so he was able to see the start of his grandchildren's careers. He died sometime after 1342. A lawsuit took place between the nuns of Veszprém Valley and Lőrinte's descendants over the estate Padrag (present-day a borough of Ajka) in that year (in August), when locals remembered that the still living Lőrinte has been alive for 100 years or more, outliving five kings (most recently Charles I) and two anti-kings.

== Sources ==
- Béli, Gábor (2008). A nemesek négy bírója. A szolgabírók működésének első korszaka 1268–1351 [The Four Judges of the Nobles. The First Period of the Operation of the Noble Judges 1268–1351] (in Hungarian). Dialóg Campus. ISBN 978-963-7296-60-4.
- Engel, Pál (1996). Magyarország világi archontológiája, 1301–1457, I. [Secular Archontology of Hungary, 1301–1457, Volume I] (in Hungarian). História, MTA Történettudományi Intézete. ISBN 963-8312-44-0.
- Karácsonyi, János (1900). A magyar nemzetségek a XIV. század közepéig. [The Hungarian genera until the middle of the 14th century] (in Hungarian). Hungarian Academy of Sciences.
- Rainer, Pál (2008). "Segvártól Essegvárig. A bándi vár és birtokosainak történetéből [From Segvár to Essegvár. From the History of the Castle of Bánd and its Possessors]". Castrum (in Hungarian). 8 (2). Castrum Bene Egyesület: 7–47. ISSN 1787-1093.
- Solymosi, László (1984). "Hospeskiváltság 1275-ből [A Hospes Privilege from 1275]". In Kredics, László (ed.). Tanulmányok Veszprém megye múltjából [Essays on the Past of Veszprém County] (in Hungarian). Veszprém Megyei Levéltár. pp. 17–100. ISBN 963-01-4537-5.
- Zsoldos, Attila (2011). Magyarország világi archontológiája, 1000–1301 [Secular Archontology of Hungary, 1000–1301] (in Hungarian). História, MTA Történettudományi Intézete. ISBN 978-963-9627-38-3.

Lőrinte II Genus Lőrinte Born: c. 1242 Died: after 1342
Political offices
Preceded by Stephen Rátót (?)	Ispán of Veszprém; 1291–1292	Succeeded by John Péc
Preceded by John Péc	Ispán of Veszprém; 1298–1302	Succeeded by Stephen Kéki (?)
