= Daniel Kustáni =

- Died: after 1444
- Noble family: House of Kustáni
- Issue: Paul; Ladislaus IV; Lucas II
- Father: Ladislaus III Kustáni

Daniel Kustáni (Hungarian: Kustáni Dániel; died after 1444) was a Hungarian nobleman in the first half of the 15th century.

== Life ==
Daniel was a member of the Kustáni family, which belonged to the lower nobility in Zala County and originated from the extended gens (clan) Péc. His father was Ladislaus III (fl. 1372). He had three sons, Paul, Ladislaus IV and Lucas II. Ladislaus was a familiaris of Ladislaus Pető, who served as castellan of Tátika in 1443, while Lucas was referred as vice-ispán of Zala County around 1455. Daniel Kustáni was first mentioned by contemporary records in 1399. Kustáni was involved in that lawsuit over the ownership of the clan's ancient land Péc (today Felpéc and Kajárpéc), lasted from 1425 to 1433, in which all descendant noble families of the Péc clan became interested. Kustáni joined the lawsuit in July 1426.

Kustáni participated in the Diet of 1442, as one of the six representatives of the Hungarian lower nobility. During the meeting, Władysław III of Poland and the Estates issued a safe conduct to his rival Elizabeth of Luxembourg on 16 August 1442 in Buda. Kustáni's unidentified seal was cut off from the document. Kustáni was also a member of that Diet, which took place on 18 April 1444, and confirmed the laws of Władysław III.

== Sources ==
- Engel, Pál (1996). Magyarország világi archontológiája, 1301–1457, I. [Secular Archontology of Hungary, 1301–1457, Volume I] (in Hungarian). História, MTA Történettudományi Intézete. ISBN 963-8312-44-0.
- Nagy, Imre (1892). A Pécz nemzetség örökösödési pere 1425–1433 [The Inheritance Lawsuit of the Péc Clan 1425–1433] (in Hungarian). Hungarian Academy of Sciences.
