= George Péc =

Ispán of Zala
- Reign: 1243–1244
- Predecessor: Martin Ják
- Successor: Bogomer Ludány
- Died: after 1256
- Noble family: gens Péc
- Issue: Denis; Serfesd Nevnai; Peter Ludbregi
- Father: Lucas I

George from the kindred Péc (Hungarian: Péc nembeli György; died after 1256) was a Hungarian noble in the first half of the 13th century, who served as ispán of Zala County from 1243 to 1244.

== Biography ==
George originated from the Zala branch of the extended gens (clan) Péc, which had large-scale possessions in several counties of Transdanubia, in addition to other parts of the Kingdom of Hungary. His father was Lucas, a staunch supporter of King Andrew II of Hungary, who presumably served as Master of the cupbearers in the royal court from 1229 to 1230 and also held various ispánates. George had two brothers: Mark I and Lucas II (also known as Lucas the Great). George had three sons from his unidentified marriage; Denis was an influential baron and skilled military leader during the second half of the 13th century, while Serfesd and Peter, who were referred with the surname Nevnai and Ludbregi after their residence, present-day Levanjska Varoš and Ludbreg, respectively, remained landowners among the local nobility along the Drava River. George's branch became extinct after two generations.

George is first referred by contemporary records in 1232, when he appears as a witness in the so-called Kehida Diploma. The lawsuit between baron Atyusz III Atyusz and royal servants in Zala County, and its consequences proved to be the first milestone towards the noble self-determination. George possessed large-scale landholdings and estates in the northwest corner of Slavonia, the borderland of Zala, Varaždin (Varasd) and Križevci (Kőrös) counties. He was a confidant of Béla IV of Hungary. He served as ispán of Zala County from 1243 to 1244. His deputy ("curialis comes") was a certain Ezen in 1244. For his service, George was granted Ludbreg sometimes before 1248, as Béla IV referred to him "neighbor lord" during an act of land donation near Koprivnica. Ludbreg later became a residence of his son Peter, who erected a castle above the village and adopted his surname after his lands' centre. This branch died out with George's grandson Nicholas Ludbregi in 1357, thereafter Ludbreg and other lands became the property of Ban John Csúz and his descendants.

It is presumable that George functioned as ispán of Križevci (or Kőrös) County from around 1252 to 1253. George filed a lawsuit for the ownership of Tursoy, an island on the Drava river, in 1256. His efforts failed, the land was granted to the hospes (foreign "guest settlers") of Varaždin. This is the last piece of information about him. His son Denis entered political career in the same year.

== Sources ==
- Engel, Pál (1996). Magyarország világi archontológiája, 1301–1457, I. [Secular Archontology of Hungary, 1301–1457, Volume I] (in Hungarian). História, MTA Történettudományi Intézete. ISBN 963-8312-44-0.
- Kádár, Tamás (2018). "Egy figyelemre méltó Dráva vidéki főúr a 13. század második feléből: Péc nembeli György fia Dénes nádor és országbíró közéleti pályája [A Remarkable Lord from the Dráva Region in the Second Half of the 13th Century: The Public Career of Palatine and Judge Royal Denis, son of George from the Clan Péc]". Somogy Megye Múltjából (in Hungarian). 45–46: 5–19. ISSN 1419-8010.
- Zsoldos, Attila (1997). "»Eléggé nemes férfiak...« A kehidai oklevél társadalomtörténeti vonatkozásairól". In Káli, Csaba (ed.). Zalai történeti tanulmányok [Essays on History of Zala] (in Hungarian). Zala County Archives. pp. 7–19. ISBN 963-7226-26-5.
- Zsoldos, Attila (2011). Magyarország világi archontológiája, 1000–1301 [Secular Archontology of Hungary, 1000–1301] (in Hungarian). História, MTA Történettudományi Intézete. ISBN 978-963-9627-38-3.

George Genus Péc Born: ? Died: after 1256
Political offices
Preceded by Martin Ják	Ispán of Zala; 1243–1244	Succeeded by Bogomer Ludány
Preceded by Dominic	Ispán of Kőrös; 1252–1253	Succeeded by Junk Isaan
