= Denis Péc =

Hungarian baron and soldier

Palatine of Hungary
- Reign: 1273–1274; 1277–1278; 1283–1284
- Predecessor: Roland Rátót (1st term); Peter Csák (2nd term); Matthew Csák (3rd term)
- Successor: Roland Rátót (1st term); Peter Csák (2nd term); Nicholas Kőszegi (3rd term)
- Born: 1223/28
- Died: 1285/88
- Noble family: gens Péc
- Issue: John a daughter
- Father: George

Denis from the kindred Péc (Hungarian: Péc nembeli Dénes; died between 1285 and 1288) was a Hungarian baron and soldier in the 13th century. Initially, he was a confidant of rex iunior Stephen, but later joined the partisans of the elderly Béla IV of Hungary. He actively participated in the military campaigns against Austria and Bohemia. He served as Palatine of Hungary and other high-ranking positions several times during the era of feudal anarchy.

== Family ==
Denis originated from the Zala branch of the extended gens (clan) Péc, which had large-scale possessions in several counties of Transdanubia, in addition to other parts of the Kingdom of Hungary. Denis was born between around 1223 and 1228, as one of the three sons of George, who presumably served as ispán of Zala County from 1243 to 1244. His brothers were Serfesd and Peter, who were referred with the surname Nevnai and Ludbregi after their residence, present-day Levanjska Varoš and Ludbreg, respectively. Denis had several influential relatives, including his cousins Gregory and Apor. Denis had two children from his unidentified wife: his son, John was ispán of Veszprém County as a confidant of Queen Mother Tomasina Morosini in 1295, while his unidentified daughter married Stephen Hahót. Through their only son Nicholas, they were ancestors of the powerful Bánfi (Bánffy) de Alsólendva noble family.

== Duke Stephen's partisan ==
Denis is first mentioned by contemporary records in March 1256, when he was already styled as ispán of Szolnok County. As his immediate predecessor Denis Türje had died in the previous year, it is plausible that Denis Péc held the position since the second half of 1255. He functioned in this capacity at least until April 1258, when he was referred as ispán of the Bakony royal forest too, which laid in the territory of Veszprém County. Even then, Denis was a staunch supporter of Duke Stephen, as the royal forest belonged to the dominion of King Béla IV's eldest son, who was made Duke of Styria in that year. As the office of Szolnok ispánate was united with the dignity Voivode of Transylvania in the 1260s, which lasted until the 15th century, Denis was the last known individual holder of the position before that.

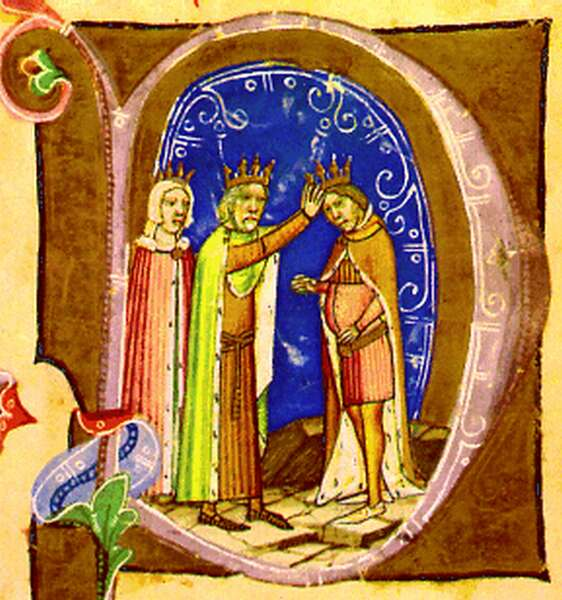
Stephen V is crowned by his father, Béla IV (from the Illuminated Chronicle)

Styria had been annexed in 1254, but the local lords rose up in rebellion and expelled Béla IV's governor, Stephen Gutkeled, before Duke Stephen's appointment, who also received two neighboring counties—Vas and Zala—in Hungary from his father. Denis was one of those young lords with illustrious Transdanubian noble origin, who remained without office due to the influence of older generations in the royal court of Béla IV, as a result, they supported the duke's efforts. Denis participated in that military campaign, when Duke Stephen and his father jointly invaded Styria and subdued the rebels. Denis was styled as Master of the stewards in the ducal court, ispán of Zala County and captain of Pettau (present-day Ptuj in Slovenia) on 26 May 1259, when he resided in Graz, the seat of the Styrian province, along with his lord. In that capacity, he was subordinated to Stephen Gutkeled, who governed the occupied province from Pettau Castle. However, with support from King Ottokar II of Bohemia, the local lords again rebelled. By January 1260, Duke Stephen could preserve only Pettau and its region, where Denis served as captain. He participated in the subsequent skirmishes, but the entire province were lost for the Hungarians after the Battle of Kressenbrunn in July 1260. Thereafter Stephen left Styria and returned to Transylvania. Around the same time, Denis was replaced as ispán of Zala County by Csák Hahót.

Stephen's relationship with Béla IV deteriorated in the early 1260s. Following a brief internal conflict, Béla IV and his son divided the country and Stephen received the lands to the east of the Danube, in accordance with the Peace of Pressburg, which was concluded around 25 November and confirmed on 5 December 1262. Becoming one of the most important partisans of the rex iunior, Denis served as palatine of the ducal court and ispán of Bács County at least since 3 May 1263, but it is plausible that he already held both dignities since December 1262. Denis participated in the duke's Bulgarian campaign in the second half of 1263, as he issued a royal charter at Pétervárad (present-day Petrovaradin, Serbia) in October 1263. His vice-palatine Gotthard was mentioned once in 1264, who seated in Hatvan, as Denis exercised his rights of judging primarily in the southern parts of the kingdom. Despite his influence and high-ranking positions, Denis betrayed his lord, Duke Stephen and joined the partisans of Béla IV sometimes in the autumn of 1264. Around the same time, the king and his loyal advisers began to secretly contact with the most influential courtiers of Stephen, in order to persuade and bribe them to left the duke's allegiance. Historian Tamás Kádár argues Denis' relationship with the rex iunior had deteriorated and he lost power influence by then, as he did not become a member of the royal council in Béla's court thereafter: thus his change-over was a necessary, compulsive step. In addition, his inherited and acquired lands laid mostly in Kőrös (Križevci) and Zala counties, which belonged to the province of the minor Béla, Duke of Slavonia, King Béla's youngest and favorite child.

== Royal courtier ==
His involvement in the subsequent civil war between father and son is unknown. Becoming a member of Duke Béla's court in Slavonia, Denis Péc was first mentioned as ispán of Syrmia County in March 1266, but it is presumable that he was already appointed into that office right after his defection. He was styled as župan of Pset and Poljana counties, when judged over a lawsuit between the Cistercian Abbey of Topusko (Toplica) and the residents of Poljana in the same year. By 1268, Denis was promoted to higher dignity, when he became count (head) of Duke Béla's court. In addition, he also served as ispán of Nyitra County in that year. Its castle became a property of Duke Béla in 1263, among other forts. In this capacity, Denis spent months in Veszprém County, where he has reviewed previous royal land donations and determined the ownership of several areas. By early November 1268, Denis became ispán of Zala County for the second time, replacing Csák Hahót, who succeeded him as head of Nyitra County. His lord, Duke Béla died in mid-1269, not long before the death of the elderly Béla IV, who himself died on 3 May 1270. This has had a significant impact on the development of his career.

Duke Stephen elevated into the Hungarian throne as Stephen V by the end of the month. As a result, Denis Péc lost political influence for a brief time. He was replaced as ispán of Zala County by the king's faithful soldier Panyit Miskolc. The western borderlands became an area of outstanding strategic importance during the emerging war between Hungary and Bohemia. As a result, local influential lords, including Denis were partly rehabilitated politically by the end of 1270. He was made head of the Marócsa ispánate (today Moravče, Croatia) around December 1270, which located in the territory of Zagreb County. Denis Péc was one of the commanders of the royal army against the Bohemian king Ottokar II, alongside Panyit Miskolc, Gregory Monoszló and Ernye Ákos, which devastated the southeastern part of Styria and besieged Radkersburg, Fürstenfeld, Limbuh and Trasach, before returning home within days. When Stephen V personally launched a plundering raid in Austria around 21 December, Denis possibly also took part in the clashes, as his relative Nicholas was present under his banner. When King Ottokar invaded the lands north of the Danube in April 1271 and captured a number of fortresses, Denis fought in the subsequent battles. He was present, when two kings' envoys reached an agreement in Pressburg on 2 July; Stephen V confirmed the treaty with oath, Denis countersigned the document too.

== Royal baron ==
Ban Joachim Gutkeled kidnapped Stephen's ten-year-old son and heir, Ladislaus and imprisoned him in the castle of Koprivnica in the summer of 1272, which marked the beginning of the era of feudal anarchy. Stephen V immediately made a change of government sometimes before August. Denis Péc was appointed Judge royal, emerging into the royal council and becoming one of the most powerful barons of the realm. In addition to his dignity, he also functioned as ispán of Varaždin County. Stephen V died on 6 August 1272. Ladislaus IV succeeded him as King of Hungary; during his minority, many groupings of barons — primarily the Csáks, Kőszegis, and Gutkeleds — fought against each other for supreme power. According to historian Jenő Szűcs, the elderly honored barons, who were made palatines and other chief officials, such Denis Péc, Ernye Ákos, Roland Rátót and Lawrence, son of Kemény were considered stable points and "beauty spot" in the fast-changing governments during the first five regnal years of Ladislaus. Nevertheless, Denis initially belonged to the Kőszegi–Gutkeled–Geregye baronial group, which was dominated by Transdanubian barons and families. Still, soon, Denis lost his both offices by September and temporarily retired from politics. But instead, he further based his military reputation; as ispán of Oklics (present-day Konšćica-Okić, Croatia), he participated in private initiative Hungarian incursions into Austria and Moravia in February 1273, along with Matthew Csák, Ivan Kőszegi, Joachim and Amadeus Gutkeled. They marched into Fürstenfeld and besieged it, plundering and destroying the surrounding lands. In retaliation for the raids, Ottokar's troops invaded the borderlands of Hungary in April 1273. Denis fought with his rearguard near Győr in August. Alongside Joachim Gutkeled and Egidius Monoszló, who returned to Hungary from exile, he defeated a Moravian army at the walls of Detrekő Castle (today ruins near Plavecké Podhradie, Slovakia) in October.

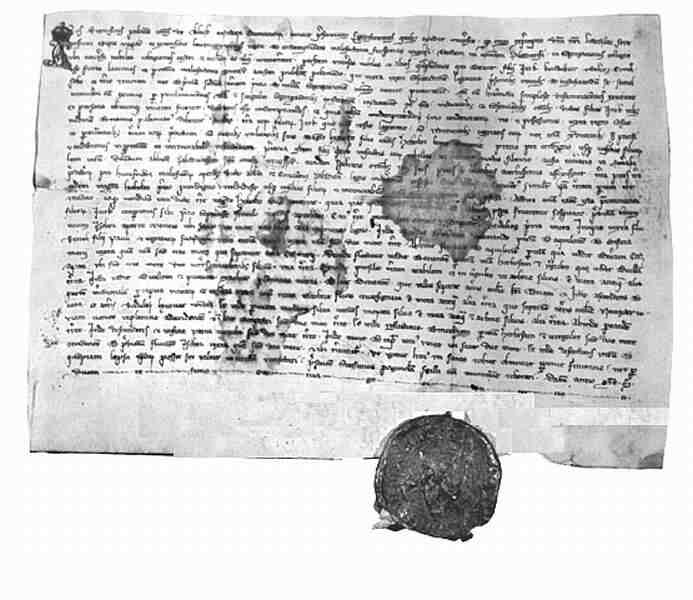
The 1273 charter of Palatine Denis Péc, which records the convocation of the initial palatinal "general assembly"

Following the repulse of the Bohemian invasion, the Kőszegis and their allies expelled several members of the royal council and established a homogeneous "party government" in late 1273, as Szűcs called in his monograph. Consequently, Denis was made Palatine of Hungary around December 1273, while retaining his position in Oklics ispánate. Despite he was considered puppet of the Kőszegi group, Denis initiated high-impact and long-lasting reforms in the institution history of the dignity of palatine during his first term. In order to remove self-declared Queen regent Elizabeth the Cuman from the power, the barons introduced reforms in the judicial sphere since the spring of 1273: at first, in Slavonia, where Henry Kőszegi served as ban, and following this in Hungary, when they occupied the important positions exclusively. Denis was the first palatine, who held a palatinal "general assembly" (Latin: generalis congregatio) immediately after his appointment. According to his charter, he convoked an assembly in Zala County and condemned two "malefactors" and confiscated their lands in absentia "on the command of the king and advice of the barons of the realm". This phrase reflects to a single royal command, which suggests that this institution was originally intended as a temporary one. A fragment of his seal is preserved on the document with the circumscription (".... IT .. ..... FILI COTS GEORGI") and schematic drawing of an elongated shield, cross and other symbols (possibly moon and star). In the spring of 1274, Denis spent months in the village of Mánd, thus it is considerable that he summoned the palatinal assembly there too in the previous year.

Peter Csák and his allies removed Joachim Gutkeled and his party from power, only Henry Kőszegi remained as ban, but without influence. Denis Péc defected from their alliance and took allegiance to the Csáks' baronial group. As a result, he was able to retain his position of palatine. In retaliation, Joachim Gutkeled and Henry Kőszegi seized Ladislaus IV and his mother in June 1274. Although Peter Csák liberated the king and his mother, the two lords captured Ladislaus's younger brother, Andrew, and took him to Slavonia. They demanded Slavonia in Duke Andrew's name, but Peter Csák defeated their united forces in the Battle of Föveny at the end of September, where Henry Kőszegi was killed. Shortly thereafter the ruling Csák group reorganized the government: Denis lost his office of palatine and succeeded the late Kőszegi as Ban of Slavonia. By January 1275, he became Judge royal and ispán of Zala County. He lost both offices by March, in accordance with Ladislaus' favoritism towards either the Csák or the Kőszegi baronial groups. He functioned as ispán of Zala County again since April 1275, while he was also made Master of the treasury in the court of Queen Elizabeth of Sicily in June, holding both positions until the second half of 1275. Ladislaus IV donated the ispánate of Marócsa and its castle hereditarily to Denis on 11 August 1275. Denis built the fort of Zelna (today ruins in Sveti Ivan Zelina, Croatia) there in the upcoming years.

Denis Péc served as Judge royal for the third time in 1277. Only a single charter preserved that terms of office, when he stayed in Sopron in the king's escort in November. His deputy was vice-judge royal Ompudinus, who already functioned in that capacity in July. Denis Péc was present, when Ladislaus IV met Rudolf I of Germany in Hainburg an der Donau on 11 November to confirm their alliance against Ottokar II of Bohemia. Denis elevated into the dignity of palatine by the end of the year, while he also served as ispán of Somogy County, replacing Peter Csák. He convened the second documented palatinal generalis congregatio at Kaposvár in February 1278. Alongside his cousin Gregory Péc, he resided in Somogyvár in the next month, where he acted as an arbiter in a lawsuit between John Bő and Atyusz Hahót. By 22 March, Denis was succeeded by Peter Csák in both positions. Brothers Nicholas II and Stephen II Gutkeled reconciled with their rivals, the Babonići in Zagreb in November 1278. Hungarian lords Matthew Csák, Stephen Csák, Denis Péc and his brother, Peter Ludbregi made a guaranty text for the Gutkeleds. He co-chaired the third generalis congregatio in February 1279 in Babót, Somogy County, alongside Matthew Csák.

Denis is next mentioned by contemporary records in October 1282, when he functioned as ispán of Sáros County. He bore the title until at least July 1284. Sometimes between April and October 1283, he was appointed Palatine of Hungary for the third time, while he also functioned as ispán of Somogy County. He held the positions until July 1284, without interruption. He was Master of the treasury in the court of Queen Elizabeth of Sicily and ispán of Zala County in October 1285. Denis Péc died before 7 March 1288.

== Sources ==
- Kádár, Tamás (2018). "Egy figyelemre méltó Dráva vidéki főúr a 13. század második feléből: Péc nembeli György fia Dénes nádor és országbíró közéleti pályája [A Remarkable Lord from the Dráva Region in the Second Half of the 13th Century: The Public Career of Palatine and Judge Royal Denis, son of George from the Clan Péc]". Somogy Megye Múltjából (in Hungarian). 45–46: 5–19. ISSN 1419-8010.
- Markó, László (2006). A magyar állam főméltóságai Szent Istvántól napjainkig: Életrajzi Lexikon [Great Officers of State in Hungary from King Saint Stephen to Our Days: A Biographical Encyclopedia] (in Hungarian). Helikon Kiadó. ISBN 963-208-970-7.
- Szőcs, Tibor (2014). A nádori intézmény korai története, 1000–1342 [An Early History of the Palatinal Institution: 1000–1342] (in Hungarian). Magyar Tudományos Akadémia Támogatott Kutatások Irodája. ISBN 978-963-508-697-9.
- Szűcs, Jenő (2002). Az utolsó Árpádok [The Last Árpáds] (in Hungarian). Osiris Kiadó. ISBN 963-389-271-6.
- Zsoldos, Attila (2007). Családi ügy: IV. Béla és István ifjabb király viszálya az 1260-as években [A family affair: The Conflict between Béla IV and Junior King Stephen in the 1260s] (in Hungarian). História, MTA Történettudományi Intézete. ISBN 978-963-9627-15-4.
- Zsoldos, Attila (2011). Magyarország világi archontológiája, 1000–1301 [Secular Archontology of Hungary, 1000–1301] (in Hungarian). História, MTA Történettudományi Intézete. ISBN 978-963-9627-38-3.

Denis Genus Péc Born: 1223/28 Died: 1285/88
Political offices
Preceded by Office established	Palatine for rex iunior Stephen; 1262–1264	Succeeded by Dominic Csák
Preceded by Nicholas Monoszló	Judge royal 1272	Succeeded by Alexander Karászi
Preceded by Roland Rátót	Palatine of Hungary; 1273–1274	Succeeded by Roland Rátót
Preceded by Henry Kőszegi	Ban of Slavonia; 1274(–1275)	Succeeded by Ivan Kőszegi & Nicholas Gutkeled
Preceded by Ernye Ákos	Judge royal 1275	Succeeded by Thomas Hont-Pázmány
Preceded by James Bána	Judge royal 1277	Succeeded by Roland Rátót
Preceded by Peter Csák	Palatine of Hungary; 1277–1278	Succeeded by Peter Csák
Preceded by Matthew Csák	Palatine of Hungary; 1283–1284	Succeeded by Nicholas Kőszegi
