= Apor Szentgyörgyi =

Hungarian noble

- Died: after 1360
- Noble family: House of Szentgyörgyi
- Spouse: N Kórógyi
- Issue: Peter; John; Stephen
- Father: Lucas III Péc

Apor Szentgyörgyi (Hungarian: Szentgyörgyi Apor; died after 1360) was a Hungarian noble in the 14th century. He was also known as Apor of Tátika.

== Life ==
Apor was the first member of the short-lived Szentgyörgyi family, which originated from the Zala branch of the extended gens (clan) Péc, which had large-scale possessions in several counties of Transdanubia, in addition to other parts of the Kingdom of Hungary. He was a son of Lucas III Péc, who served as ispán of Zala County in the 1290s. He had four brothers, Desiderius, Stephen II, Egidius and Nicholas, who had no known descendants.

He took the surname Szentgyörgyi. He is first mentioned by contemporary records in 1341, when the kinship attempted to recover the fort of Tátika for themselves, but King Charles I of Hungary dismissed their claim because his father and uncle (Apor) had unlawfully seized the castle from the Diocese of Veszprém at the time. He was a familiaris in the episcopal court of John Garai, Bishop of Veszprém. He served as castellan of Sümeg in 1347. He was last mentioned by sources in 1360, when unlawfully seized the village of Maros from the Diocese of Veszprém, alongside his brother Desiderius. He had three sons from his marriage with an unidentified daughter of Lawrence Kórógyi, but the Szentgyörgyi family became extinct by the 1360s.

=== Family ===
- Apor (fl. 1341–60) ∞ N Kórógyi (fl. 1351)
  - Peter (fl. 1353–64)
  - John (fl. 1353–64)
  - Stephen (mentioned as "late" in 1431)

== Sources ==
- Engel, Pál (1996). Magyarország világi archontológiája, 1301–1457, I. [Secular Archontology of Hungary, 1301–1457, Volume I] (in Hungarian). História, MTA Történettudományi Intézete. ISBN 963-8312-44-0.
- Kumorovitz, L. Bernát (1953). Veszprémi regeszták (1301–1387) [Abstracts of Charters from the Diocese of Veszprém (1301–1387)] (in Hungarian). Akadémiai Kiadó.
