= Gregory Péc =

Hungarian baron and soldier

Judge royal
- Reign: 1288
- Predecessor: Demetrius Balassa
- Successor: Amadeus Aba
- Born: 1240s
- Died: after 1296/1309
- Noble family: gens Péc
- Issue: Joachim
- Father: Mark I

Gregory from the kindred Péc (Hungarian: Péc nembeli Gergely; died after 1296/1309) was a Hungarian baron and soldier in the 13th century, who served as Judge royal in 1288. He was a forefather of the late medieval powerful Marcali family.

== Family ==
Gregory was born in the first half of the 1240s. He originated from the Zala branch of the extended gens (clan) Péc, which had large-scale possessions in several counties of Transdanubia, in addition to other parts of the Kingdom of Hungary. He was the eldest son of Mark I, who appeared in contemporary documents in the period between 1240 and 1245. Gregory had four younger brothers, Mark II, Stephen, Lucas III and Apor. Stephen was the ancestor of the Berzencei (or Musinai) family and its cadet branches, the Lorántfis and Sándorfis. Lucas was ispán of Zala County, while Apor was considered an influential baron at the turn of the 13th and 14th centuries. Their cousin was Denis, the most notable member of the clan.

Gregory had a son Joachim from his marriage to an unidentified noble lady. Joachim was referred by written records from 1311 to 1321. His castle at Szentgyörgy (also called Békavár, lit. "Frog's Castle") was besieged and captured by Andrew Kőszegi around 1315. Through his only grandson Stephen, Gregory was the forefather of the powerful Marcali family, which became prominent in the 15th century. The family died out in 1487.

== Career ==
Gregory is first mentioned by a royal charter in 1266, which refers to him as ispán of Rojcsa (today Rovišće, Croatia), which laid in the territory of Križevci (Kőrös) County and belonged to the dominion of Béla, Duke of Slavonia. In this capacity, he participated in the Bulgarian campaign, which took place in that year. When Duke Stephen's vassal, Despot Jacob Svetoslav submitted himself to Tsar Constantine Tikh of Bulgaria, taking advantage of the civil war in Hungary, they crossed the Danube in 1265 and raided the Hungarian fortresses north of the river which belonged to Stephen's realm. In response, after Béla IV and his son Stephen signed the peace treaty on the Rabbits' Island, the rex junior, with the limited support of Béla's royal army, invaded Bulgaria in the summer of 1266. The main army seized Vidin, Pleven and other forts, while another army commanded by Gregory Péc routed the Bulgarians in Vrchov (or Vracsa). In the same time, Egidius Monoszló led Stephen's army to successfully besiege and capture Tirnovo, also plundering the surrounding areas. Historian Attila Zsoldos considers the intention behind the appointment of the young Gregory as leader of one of the involving armies was to give him opportunity to demonstrate his military skills. Duke Stephen, a talented military leader, has been trying to build personal relationships with those noblemen, who arrived to Bulgaria from his father Béla's dominion.

His political career reached its peak during the reign of Ladislaus IV of Hungary, whose rule was characterized by feudal anarchy, when many groupings of barons — primarily the Csáks, Kőszegis, and Gutkeleds — fought against each other for supreme power. When Béla of Macsó was murdered by Henry Kőszegi and his soldiers following a sharp dispute around 15 November 1272, his province, the Duchy of Macsó was divided among the members of the leading noble families. Gregory Péc became Ban of Barancs and Kucsó (present-day Braničevo and Kučevo in east-central Serbia, respectively), first mentioned in this capacity on 27 November. He still held both dignities on 14 May 1273. However, both banates proved to be short-lived administrative units. He was succeeded by Stephen, son of Tekesh as Ban of Kucsó in 1279, while the region of Braničevo was ruled by two Bulgarian nobles, brothers Darman and Kudelin shortly after Gregory's last appearance as ban.

Gregory fought against the troops of Ottokar II of Bohemia, who invaded the borderlands of Hungary in April 1273. He participated in numerous clashes against the Moravian army alongside his kinsmen, Denis and Benedict. Gregory served as ispán of Somogy County from June to September/December 1275. He regained the office around July 1276, holding the position until the same month of the next year. He functioned as judge royal around September 1288, during the last regnal years of Ladislaus IV. It is possible that he held the dignity until the next year, when he was succeeded by Amadeus Aba.

Following Ladislaus' assassination in 1290, Gregory was considered a confidant of Andrew III of Hungary. His inherited and acquired lands laid in the borderland of domains of two oligarchic powers, the Csáks and the Kőszegi family, thus his political, social and financial status were constantly at risk. It is plausible that he built the castle of Szentgyörgy in order to protect his landholdings against the Kőszegis. He was made ispán of Bars and Nyitra counties in 1291 to represent the royal power in the dominion of the Csák clan. After the Austrian–Hungarian War in the summer of 1291, where the Hungarians won a superior victory, Gregory was delegated to the four-member Hungarian diplomatic mission to conduct peace negotiations with the Austrian counterpart, alongside archbishops Lodomer and John Hont-Pázmány, and former palatine Dominic Csák. The Peace of Hainburg, which concluded the war, was signed on 26 August 1291, and three days later Andrew and Albert of Austria confirmed it at their meeting in Köpcsény (today Kopčany, Slovakia). When Andrew III and Albert of Austria jointly invaded the Kőszegis' lands and their main fort at Kőszeg in August 1296, Gregory participated in the military campaign. This is the last relevant information about him. Following Andrew's death in 1301, he retired from public life, if he was still alive at all. According to a non-authentic charter dated July 1309 (in fact it was written a century later), he acted as an arbiter in a lawsuit between the Tengerdis and the Somogyvár Abbey.

== Sources ==
- Engel, Pál (1996). Magyarország világi archontológiája, 1301–1457, I. [Secular Archontology of Hungary, 1301–1457, Volume I] (in Hungarian). História, MTA Történettudományi Intézete. ISBN 963-8312-44-0.
- Markó, László (2006). A magyar állam főméltóságai Szent Istvántól napjainkig: Életrajzi Lexikon [Great Officers of State in Hungary from King Saint Stephen to Our Days: A Biographical Encyclopedia] (in Hungarian). Helikon Kiadó. ISBN 963-208-970-7.
- Zsoldos, Attila (2007). Családi ügy: IV. Béla és István ifjabb király viszálya az 1260-as években [A family affair: The Conflict between Béla IV and Junior King Stephen in the 1260s] (in Hungarian). História, MTA Történettudományi Intézete. ISBN 978-963-9627-15-4.
- Zsoldos, Attila (2011). Magyarország világi archontológiája, 1000–1301 [Secular Archontology of Hungary, 1000–1301] (in Hungarian). História, MTA Történettudományi Intézete. ISBN 978-963-9627-38-3.

Gregory Genus Péc Born: 1240s Died: after 1296/1309
Political offices
Preceded by Office established	Ban of Barancs; 1272–1273	Succeeded by Territory ruled by Darman and Kudelin
Preceded by Office established	Ban of Kucsó; 1272–1273	Succeeded by Stephen, son of Tekesh
Preceded by Demetrius Balassa	Judge royal 1288	Succeeded by Amadeus Aba
