= Julius Kán =

Julius Kán (Hungarian: Kán Gyula) may refer to:

- Julius I Kán (died 1237)
- Julius II Kán (died after 1234)
- Julius III Kán (died after 1294)
