= Punik Gárdony =

Hungarian noble and landowner

Ispán of Zagreb
- Reign: 1326–1327
- Predecessor: vacant
- Successor: Denis (?)
- Died: after 1333
- Noble family: gens Gárdony
- Issue: Peter; Roland
- Father: Vukoslav

Punik from the kindred Gárdony (Hungarian: Gárdony nembeli Punik; died after 1333) was a Hungarian noble and landowner in Slavonia in the first half of the 14th century, who served as ispán of Zagreb County from 1326 to 1327. He was the ancestor of the Grebeni noble family.

== Career ==
Punik was born into the Slavonian-origin gens Gárdony as the son of Vukoslav (or Ulkoszló). He had a brother Hector, ispán of Kőrös (Križevci) County from 1321 to 1322.

Punik was a familiar to the Babonić kindred along with Hector. In 1321, the Gárdony brothers had their tax-exemption was confirmed by King Charles I of Hungary. In December 1322, the 1247 and 1291 royal permissions to authorise to finish Greben Castle was transcribed upon the request of Punik and Hector, while they resided in Temesvár (today Timișoara, Romania), the royal seat of Charles.

When Mikcs Ákos was appointed as Ban of Slavonia in 1325 to administer Croatia, Dalmatia and Slavonia, Punik swore allegiance to Charles' new royal governor immediately. Unlike him, Hector remained faithful to the Babonić clan. This resulted a conflict between the brothers. As loyal to Mikcs Ákos, Punik was appointed ispán of Zagreb County, putting an end to a fifty-year period of vacancy since the emergence of oligarchic powers of Paul Šubić and the Babonići in Croatia and Slavonia, respectively.

After the Babonić revolt was suppressed by Mikcs Ákos before November 1326, Hector also surrendered. As Punik's son Peter Grebeni remembered a charter, Hector gave his portion in Greben Castle to the Ban, who occupied the half owned by Punik by force, assuming a role reversal has taken place between the Gárdony brothers. According to a royal charter, Mikcs retook the castle from Punik in a battle in the first half of 1327, where his son was wounded, confirming the hypothesis that Punik turned against the Ban who represented the royal power in Slavonia. This act resulted that the Gárdony kindred lost their castle for almost thirty years. Between 1357 and 1360, Louis I of Hungary restored to Punik's sons Peter and Roland the possession of Greben Castle, and they also adopted the Grebeni surname after that.

== Sources ==
- Engel, Pál (1996). Magyarország világi archontológiája, 1301–1457, I. [Secular Archontology of Hungary, 1301–1457, Volume I] (in Hungarian). História, MTA Történettudományi Intézete. ISBN 963-8312-44-0.
- Pálosfalvi, Tamás (2014). The Noble Elite in the County of Körös (Križevci), 1400–1526 (in Hungarian). MTA Bölcsészettudományi Kutatóközpont. ISBN 978-963-962-7840.

Punik Genus Gárdony Born: ? Died: after 1333
Political offices
Preceded by vacant	Ispán of Zagreb; 1326–1327	Succeeded by Denis (?)
