= Julius II Kán =

Julius (II) Kán
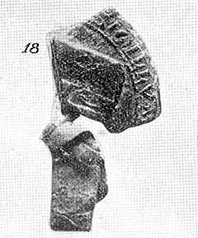
- Seal of Julius II Kán (1224)

Master of the cupbearers
- Reign: 1222–1228
- Predecessor: Lawrence Atyusz
- Successor: Lucas Péc
- Born: Unknown
- Died: after 1234
- Noble family: gens Kán
- Issue: Nicholas I
- Father: Julius I Kán
- Mother: Helena N

Julius (II) from the kindred Kán (Hungarian: Kán nembeli (II.) Gyula; died after 1234) was a Hungarian noble from the gens Kán, who served as master of the cupbearers between 1222 and 1228. His father was Julius I Kán, a powerful baron during the first third of the 13th century. His brother was Ladislaus I Kán.

Julius II also served as ispán (comes) of Moson (1228) and Bodrog Counties (1234). Between 1229 and 1234, he also functioned as master of the treasury for prince Coloman.

== Sources ==
- (in Hungarian) Markó, László (2006). A magyar állam főméltóságai Szent Istvántól napjainkig – Életrajzi Lexikon ("The High Officers of the Hungarian State from Saint Stephen to the Present Days – A Biographical Encyclopedia") (2nd edition); Helikon Kiadó Kft., Budapest; ISBN 963-547-085-1.
- (in Hungarian) Zsoldos, Attila (2011). Magyarország világi archontológiája, 1000–1301 ("Secular Archontology of Hungary, 1000–1301"). História, MTA Történettudományi Intézete. Budapest. ISBN 978-963-9627-38-3

Julius II Genus Kán Born: ? Died: ?
Political offices
Preceded by Lawrence Atyusz	Master of the cupbearers 1222–1228	Succeeded by Lucas Péc
