= Hector Gárdony =

Hungarian noble and landowner

Ispán of Kőrös
- Reign: 1321–1322
- Predecessor: James
- Successor: Stephen, son of Sandur
- Died: after 1333
- Noble family: gens Gárdony
- Father: Vukoslav

Hector from the kindred Gárdony (Hungarian: Gárdony nembeli Hektor; died after 1333) was a Hungarian noble and landowner in Slavonia in the first half of the 14th century, who served as ispán of Kőrös (Križevci) County from 1321 to 1322.

== Career ==
Hector was born into the Slavonian-origin gens Gárdony as the son of Vukoslav (or Ulkoszló). He had a brother Punik, ispán of Zagreb County from 1326 to 1327, and also ancestor of the Grebeni noble family.

Hector was a faithful familiar to the Babonić kindred. When Augustin Kažotić, the Bishop of Zagreb traveled to Avignon in late 1318 to seek Pope John XXII's assistance in regard to ongoing conflicts with King Charles I, found himself exiled from the kingdom. This resulted raids against the villages of the Diocese of Zagreb by the Kőszegi troops. Despite the Kőszegis' revolt was crushed, attacks continued as Pope John XXII urged the bishops of Pécs, Bosnia and Knin to excommunicate the attackers in a decree on 1 October 1319. The main organizer of these raids was Hector Gárdony in the service of Ban John Babonić. Hector made alliance with hospes of Kőrös (Križevci) County to attack the Čazma and Dubrava districts belonged to the diocese by ravaging its lands, looting goods and capturing prisoners. The King's loyal soldier Nicholas Ludbregi and his army entered Križevci and freed the captives. Following that his troops plundered the land of Blezna which belonged to Petres, a familial of Hector. Petres himself was wounded and imprisoned.

By the end of 1321, Hector became ispán of Kőrös County, presumably in the service of John Babonić. In May 1322, Hector attacked one of Ludbregi's estates and destroyed the local monastery dedicated to Saint Clement of Rome. After a series of plundering actions against the nearby villages, Hector gathered his army and besieged and captured Ludbreg Castle during a brief skirmish. Nicholas Ludbregi filed a lawsuit against Hector Gárdony before judge royal Lampert Hermán in October 1322. Meanwhile, Hector's patron John Babonić was dismissed and lost all political influence at the end of 1322 or early 1323. Nicholas Ludbregi was able to recapture his seat by the end of the year, while Hector Gárdony was sentenced to death in absentia in May 1323, but later acquitted by Charles, despite Ludbregi's protest.

Contemporary sources are contradictory, as the Gárdony brothers had their tax-exemption was confirmed by the king in 1321, while Hector fought against Ludbregi, a loyal soldier to Charles. In addition, while the judge royal announced a guilty verdict, Hector resided several occasions in Temesvár (today Timișoara, Romania), the royal seat of Charles I. In December 1322, for instance, the 1247 and 1291 royal permissions to authorise to finish Greben Castle was transcribed upon the request of Punik and Hector. In 1328, Hector even filed a lawsuit against Ludbregi for his acts committed earlier during their skirmish, but Charles I granted immunity to Ludbregi from his violent methods in the struggle against the oligarch powers.

While his brother swore allegiance to Ban Mikcs Ákos who was appointed to the position in 1325 and served as royal governor of Croatia and Slavonia, Hector remained faithful to the Babonić clan. This resulted a conflict between the brothers. After the Babonić revolt was suppressed by Mikcs Ákos before November 1326, Hector also surrendered. As Punik's son Peter Grebeni remembered a charter, Hector gave his portion in Greben Castle to the Ban, who occupied the half owned by Punik by force, assuming a role reversal has taken place between the Gárdony brothers. Hector also gave the land of Bikszád (today Bisag, Croatia) to a certain Mikcs, whom the Bikszádi family descended, in 1331.

== Sources ==
- B. Halász, Éva (2009). "Adalékok I. Károly király országegyesítő harcaihoz a Drávántúlon [Details on The Unification Struggles of Charles I in Trans-Drava]". In Körmendi, Tamás; Thoroczkay, Gábor (eds.). Auxilium Historiae. Tanulmányok a hetvenesztendős Bertényi Iván tiszteletére (in Hungarian). Faculty of Arts, Eötvös Loránd University. pp. 21–25. ISBN 978-963-284-105-2.
- Engel, Pál (1996). Magyarország világi archontológiája, 1301–1457, I. [Secular Archontology of Hungary, 1301–1457, Volume I] (in Hungarian). História, MTA Történettudományi Intézete. ISBN 963-8312-44-0.
- Pálosfalvi, Tamás (2014). The Noble Elite in the County of Körös (Križevci), 1400–1526 (in Hungarian). MTA Bölcsészettudományi Kutatóközpont. ISBN 978-963-962-7840.

Hector Genus Gárdony Born: ? Died: after 1333
Political offices
Preceded by James	Ispán of Kőrös; 1321–1322	Succeeded by Stephen
