= Apor Péc =

Hungarian baron and landowner

Palatine of Hungary
- Reign: 1298–1299; 1304–1307
- Predecessor: Amadeus Aba & Nicholas Kőszegi (1st term) several office-holders (2nd term)
- Successor: Amadeus Aba (1st term) several office-holders (2nd term)
- Died: 1307
- Noble family: gens Péc
- Father: Mark I

Apor from the kindred Péc (Hungarian: Péc nembeli Apor; died 1307) was a Hungarian baron and landowner at the turn of the 13th and 14th centuries, who held several secular positions during the reign of kings Ladislaus IV and Andrew III. He was one of the seven barons in the early 14th century, who were styled themselves Palatine of Hungary.

== Family ==
Apor (also Opour) was born into the Zala branch of the gens Péc as the son of ispán (comes) Mark (d. after 1245). He had four siblings, including Gregory, judge royal in 1288 and Lucas, ispán of Zala County from 1289 to 1291. He also had several influential relatives, including his cousin Denis, probably the most powerful member of the kindred. Apor died childless.

== Career ==
Apor Péc began his political career during the reign of Ladislaus IV; he served as Master of the horse and ispán of Zala County in 1280. Three years later, he was appointed Voivode of Transylvania and ispán of Szolnok County, when a series of royal concessions to the aristocracy forced Roland Borsa to resign his voivodeship in favour of Apor Péc, even though his estates laid mainly in Transdanubia. According to Romanian historian Tudor Sălăgean, Apor exerted his office from outside the province and "merely instituted an exploitation regime to the benefit of the Hungarian aristocracy". Based on the contemporary documents, Apor never demonstrated any interest in Transylvania, and he did not acquire lands there during his short-term voivodeship. Following the death of Matthew II and Peter I Csák by 1284, their baronial group which imposed Apor as voivode broke apart, thus he lost his dignity soon. Roland Borsa returned to Transylvania and retook the office in 1284.

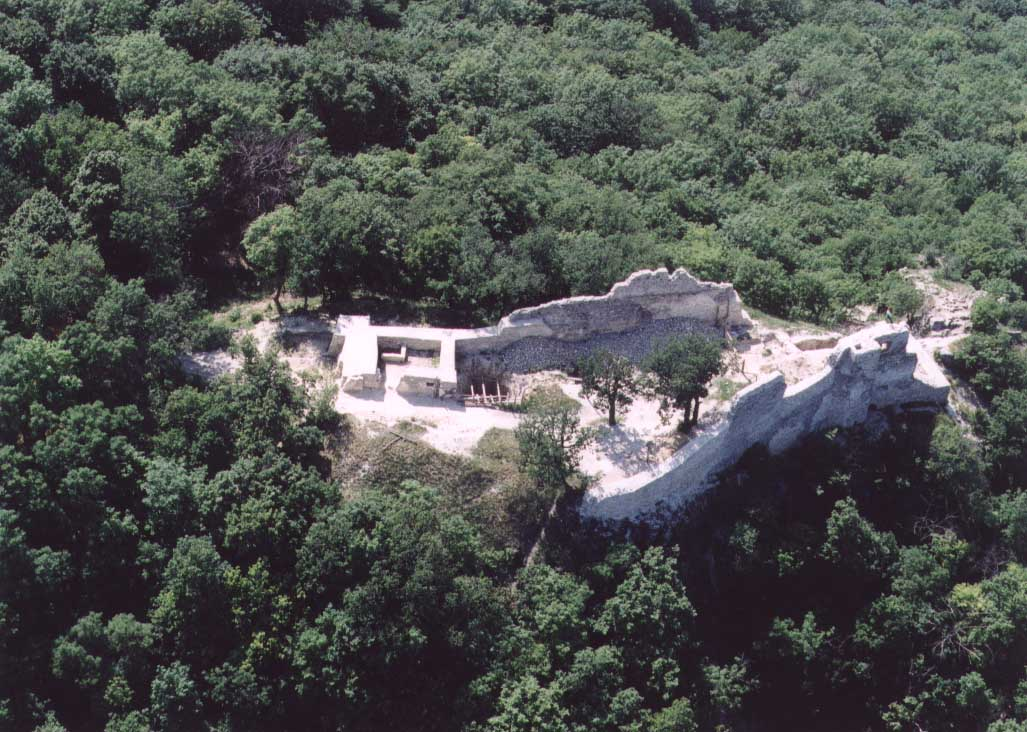
The castle of Rezi, which was seized by Apor Péc around 1290

When king Ladislaus IV led a campaign against Ivan Kőszegi and captured Kőszeg in 1286, Apor Péc, in alliance with Nicholas Kőszegi, besieged and occupied the castle of Pressburg (Pozsony; today Bratislava, Slovakia), as well as devastated its surrounding area in winter that year. However a local noble, vice-ispán John Csukárdi gathered his relatives and their forces and defeated the army of Péc, who seriously injured during the battle. After that Csukárdi reconquered the castle of Pressburg. Apor Péc lost his political influence for several years after this betrayal. He was considered a strong ally of the powerful Kőszegi family in the second half of the 1280s. According to a report, Apor invaded and seized the castle of Rezi and its surrounding lands from Tiba Tomaj around 1290.

After the coronation of Andrew III, he supported the king's efforts nominally. He served as ispán of Pozsony County between 1291 and 1292. In this capacity, he and one of his brothers, Lucas conquered by force the Tátika Castle which owned by the Diocese of Veszprém and built by Zlaudus Ják decades earlier. The bishop, Benedict Rád vainly objected at the royal court. However the castle was lost to the Kőszegi family by 1314, when Andrew Kőszegi owned the fort. Tátika Castle has been restored to its original owner only after the fall of the Kőszegis' domain.

He served as judge royal from 1293 to 1297. By that time, the importance of the position had deteriorated, since Hungary was in a state of constant anarchy during the second half of Andrew's reign. In parallel with this, his deputy, vice-judge royal Martin Devecseri was considered the monarch's personally appointed confidential expert, and himself took an effective judicial role. In accordance with contemporary customs, Devecseri adopted the seal of his nominal superior, but he was de facto the monarch's representative. For instance, Apor Péc nominated a notary to the judicial court, which resided in Buda, to represent his interests, which reflected Devecseri's institutional independence from him.

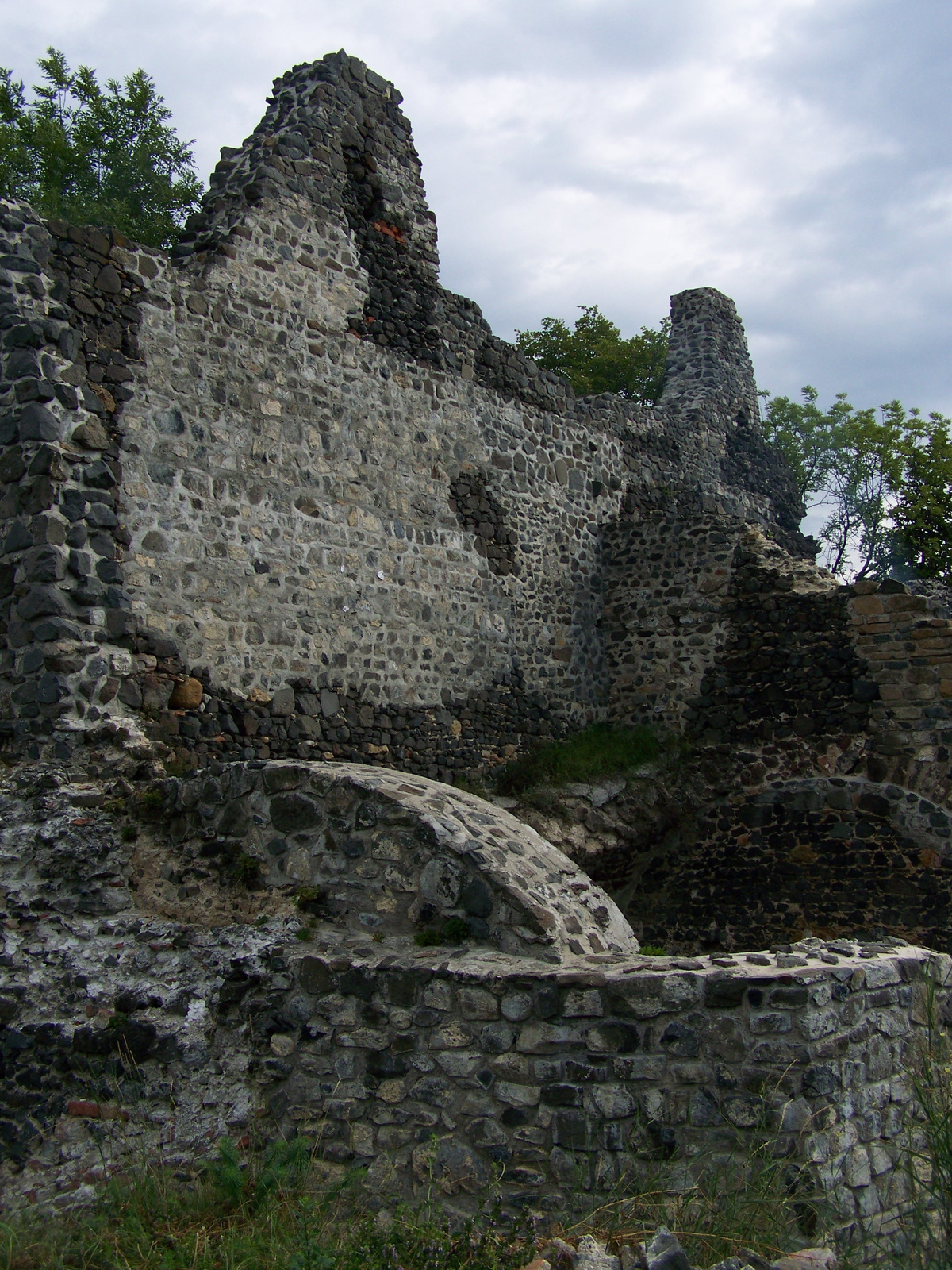
The ruins of Tátika Castle, which was seized by Apor and his brother Lucas around 1291

Maintaining the short-lived dual system in the dignity in order to avoid power struggle, which characterized the late reign of Andrew III, Apor Péc became Palatine of Hungary for the Cisdanubian region (Latin: palatinus citradanubialis) – simultaneously Roland Rátót was responsible for Transdanubia – in 1298 and held that office until the next year. In the contemporary context, this meant that Apor had jurisdiction over Western Hungary in this capacity, while Roland Rátót supervised the counties in Eastern Hungary (as "Transdanubia" had a different meaning than present days).

Andrew's death and the extinction of the Árpád dynasty marked the era of the Interregnum (1301–1310), when civil war between various claimants to the throne —Charles of Anjou, Wenceslaus of Bohemia, and Otto of Bavaria — broke out and lasted for seven years. Apor Péc was mentioned as a "baron" in various times in those period. Supporting his claim to the Hungarian throne, he was a partisan of Charles at least since 1302, but it is presumable that Apor took an oath of allegiance to him already in 1301, following Andrew's death. He participated in the unsuccessful siege of Buda in September 1302. Apor was first styled as Palatine in a document issued on August 1304. In the first decade of the 14th century, seven barons held the dignity simultaneously. Majority of the historians, including Gyula Kristó and Jenő Szűcs, considered, these barons, Matthew III Csák, Amadeus Aba, Ivan Kőszegi, Stephen Ákos, James Borsa, Roland Rátót and Apor himself were arbitrarily took and used the title, which marked its devaluation. However, historian Attila Zsoldos developed a special theory. When Andrew III formed a league against his enemies, a group of powerful lords — including the Kőszegis, Matthew Csák and Roland Borsa — urged Charles II of Naples to send his grandson, the 12-year-old Charles of Anjou, to Hungary in order to become king, according to the Illuminated Chronicle. The young prince disembarked in Split in August 1300, supported by most Croatian and Slavonian lords. However, the Kőszegis and Matthew Csák were shortly reconciled with Andrew, preventing Charles' success. Zsoldos argued Andrew III entered into a new feudal contract with the barons in the summer of 1300: Matthew Csák and Ivan Kőszegi became "perpetual" Palatines and Andrew accepted their suzerainty over their provinces, while the king's two most powerful partisans, Amadeus Aba and Stephen Ákos were also granted this privilege. In addition to them, two co-palatines of the previous year, Roland Rátót and Apor Péc also received the title as a counterweight, according to Zsoldos' theory. Therefore the historian considers Apor already bore the dignity of Palatine since the last regnal year of Andrew. Accordingly, the claimants to the Hungarian throne inherited Andrew's last decision, and they were forced to accept the status quo. As Zsoldos emphasized the oligarchs recognized each other's titles, in addition to the monarchs, cathedral chapters and other institutions. One of the basis of Zsoldos' theory is the fact that Roland Rátót and – even more – Apor Péc were considered as much less important persons than, for instance Matthew Csák or Amadeus Aba. Still, other moderately influential lords did not follow the example of Apor and Roland, and nobody else were styled as palatine beyond two of them. In a royal document from 1307, Charles also referred to Apor as palatine. After Charles' third coronation, which was performed in full accordance with customary law, on 27 August 1310, the king recognized only James Borsa as Palatine, who was appointed to the position in 1306 by Charles. Apor Péc was deceased by then.

Despite he was an early supporter of Charles, Apor remained a second-degree member of his royal court. In 1302, he was still ranked to the fourth place in a list of Charles' partisans. Two years later, he was ranked only to the eight place despite his prestigious title. Apor was last mentioned as a living person in 1307. It is plausible, he died in that year, as he was not present at the Diet of Rákos on 10 October 1307, which confirmed Charles' claim to the throne.

== Sources ==
- Engel, Pál (1996). Magyarország világi archontológiája, 1301–1457, I [Secular Archontology of Hungary, 1301–1457, Volume I] (in Hungarian). História, MTA Történettudományi Intézete. ISBN 963-8312-44-0.
- Kristó, Gyula (1999). "I. Károly király főúri elitje (1301–1309) [The Aristocratic Elite of King Charles I, 1301–1309]". Századok (in Hungarian). 133 (1). Magyar Történelmi Társulat: 41–62. ISSN 0039-8098.
- Markó, László (2006). A magyar állam főméltóságai Szent Istvántól napjainkig: Életrajzi Lexikon [Great Officers of State in Hungary from King Saint Stephen to Our Days: A Biographical Encyclopedia] (in Hungarian). Helikon Kiadó. ISBN 963-208-970-7.
- Sălăgean, Tudor (2016). Transylvania in the Second Half of the Thirteenth Century: The Rise of the Congregational System. East Central and Eastern Europe in the Middle Ages 450–1450. Vol. 37. Leiden and Boston: Brill. ISBN 978-90-04-24362-0.
- Szőcs, Tibor (2014). A nádori intézmény korai története, 1000–1342 [An Early History of the Palatinal Institution: 1000–1342] (in Hungarian). Magyar Tudományos Akadémia Támogatott Kutatások Irodája. ISBN 978-963-508-697-9.
- Szőcs, Tibor (2015). "Egy (nem) tipikus alországbíró a késő Árpád-korból: Devecseri Emych fia Márton [A (Non) Typical Vice-Judge Royal in the Late Arpadian Age: Martin, son of Emych of Devecser]". Acta Universitatis Szegediensis: Acta Historica (in Hungarian). 138: 41–62. ISSN 0324-6965.
- Zsoldos, Attila (2011a). Magyarország világi archontológiája, 1000–1301 [Secular Archontology of Hungary, 1000–1301] (in Hungarian). História, MTA Történettudományi Intézete. ISBN 978-963-9627-38-3.
- Zsoldos, Attila (2011b). "III. András hat nádora [The Six Palatines of Andrew III]". In Cabello, Juan; C. Tóth, Norbert (eds.). Erősségénél fogva várépítésre való: Tanulmányok a 70 éves Németh Péter tiszteletére [It is Very Well Placed for a Castle: Studies for the 70-year-old Péter Németh] (in Hungarian). Szabolcs-Szatmár-Bereg Megyei Önkormányzat Múzeumok Igazgatósága. pp. 289–299. ISBN 978-963-7220-75-3.

Apor Genus Péc Born: ? Died: 1307
Political offices
Preceded by H.	Master of the horse 1280	Succeeded by Roland Rátót
Preceded by Roland Borsa	Voivode of Transylvania; 1283	Succeeded by Roland Borsa
Preceded by Thomas Hont-Pázmány	Judge royal 1293–1297	Succeeded by Stephen Ákos
Preceded by Amadeus Aba & Nicholas Kőszegi	Palatine of Hungary alongside Roland Rátót; 1298–1299	Succeeded by Amadeus Aba
Preceded by several office-holders	Palatine of Hungary alongside others 1304–1307	Succeeded by several office-holders
