= Kustáni family =

Manual Functions

House of Kustáni
- Parent house: gens Péc
- Country: Kingdom of Hungary
- Founded: c. 1274
- Founder: Ladislaus I
- Final ruler: Daniel (?)
- Dissolution: 15th century

Kustáni or Kustányi was a minor noble family in the Kingdom of Hungary, which first appeared in the late 13th century and had estates and villages mostly in Zala County.

== History ==
The first member of the family was Ladislaus I (fl. 1274), who originated from the Zala branch of the gens (clan) Péc, as the son of Lucas II (also known as Lucas the Great). Ladislaus took his surname after Kustán or Kustány (present-day part of Kehidakustány).

The most notable member of the family was Daniel, who attended the national Diets as a representative of the nobles in the 1440s.

== Notable members ==
- Andrew (fl. 1400–08): a familiaris of Stephen Kanizsai, who served as castellan of Simontornya in 1405
- Daniel (fl. 1399–1444): a participant of the Diet of Hungary
- Gregory: vice-ispán of Borsod County in 1453
- Ladislaus IV: a familiaris of Ladislaus Pető, who served as castellan of Tátika in 1443
- Lucas II: vice-ispán of Zala County around 1455

== Known family tree ==
- Ladislaus I (fl. 1274)
  - Lucas I (fl. 1336–53)
    - Matthias (fl. 1372)
      - Andrew (fl. 1400–08)
    - Ladislaus III (fl. 1372)
      - Daniel (fl. 1399–1444)
        - Paul
        - Ladislaus IV (fl. 1443)
        - Lucas II (fl. 1455)
  - Ladislaus II (fl. 1336)

== Sources ==
- Engel, Pál (1996). Magyarország világi archontológiája, 1301–1457, I. [Secular Archontology of Hungary, 1301–1457, Volume I] (in Hungarian). História, MTA Történettudományi Intézete. ISBN 963-8312-44-0.
