= Pereszteg =

- Flag Coat of arms

- Location of Győr-Moson-Sopron county in Hungary

- Location of Pereszteg
- Coordinates: 47.59274°N 16.73063°E
- Country: Hungary
- County: Győr-Moson-Sopron

Area
  - Total: 22.57 km^{2} (8.71 sq mi)

Population (2004)
  - Total: 1,381
  - Density: 61.18/km^{2} (158.5/sq mi)
- Time zone: UTC+1 (CET)
  - Summer (DST): UTC+2 (CEST)
- Postal code: 9484
- Area code: 99

Pereszteg (German: Pernstegen, Bernstegen, Perestagen) is a village in Győr-Moson-Sopron county, Hungary.
