= Nagylózs =

- Flag Coat of arms

- Location of Győr-Moson-Sopron county in Hungary

- Location of Nagylózs
- Coordinates: 47.56690°N 16.77081°E
- Country: Hungary
- County: Győr-Moson-Sopron

Area
  - Total: 19.25 km^{2} (7.43 sq mi)

Population (2004)
  - Total: 910
  - Density: 47.27/km^{2} (122.4/sq mi)
- Time zone: UTC+1 (CET)
  - Summer (DST): UTC+2 (CEST)
- Postal code: 9482
- Area code: 99

Nagylózs is a village in Győr-Moson-Sopron county, Hungary.

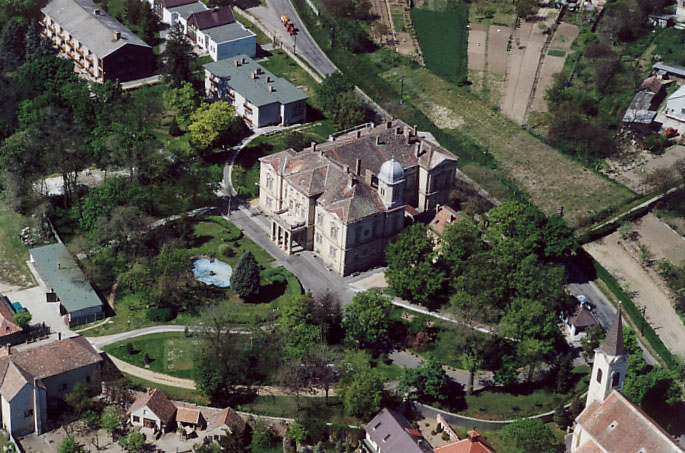
Nagylózs, palace from a bird's eye view
