= Nicholas Ludbregi =

Landowner and soldier

- Born: 1290s
- Died: 1357
- Noble family: House of Ludbregi
- Spouse: Tetis Bednyai
- Father: Peter Ludbregi

Nicholas Ludbregi (Hungarian: Ludbregi Miklós; 1290s – 1357) was a Hungarian noble, landowner and soldier in Slavonia in the first half of the 14th century.

== Family background ==
Nicholas was born into the Zala branch of the gens Péc in the 1290s as the son of Peter Ludbregi (or "Peter of Ludbreg"). The kindred originated from Győr County, Nicholas' grandfather was comes George Péc, who became the owner of Ludbreg before 1248. The castrum Ludbreg was mentioned for the first time in 1320, most possibly built by Peter in the second half of the 13th century. Peter also adopted his surname after his lands' centre.

== Career ==
Nicholas Ludbregi was first mentioned by contemporary records in 1317, when bought the estate of Goztouich in Kőrös County. As other members of his clan, he was a loyal supporter of Charles I of Hungary from the beginning who launched a unification war against the oligarchs after became undisputed King of Hungary in 1310. When Augustin Kažotić, the Bishop of Zagreb traveled to Avignon in late 1318 to seek Pope John XXII's assistance in regard to ongoing conflicts with Charles I, found himself exiled from the kingdom. Taking advantage of his absence, the King's local enemies raided and plundered the lands of the diocese. In response, Charles instructed Ludbregi in early 1319 to protect Béla Castle which belonged to the Priory of Vrana and the Order of Saint John. Despite the fact that Ludbregi strengthened the castle walls, supplied the soldiers at his own expense, the castle was seized by the Kőszegi troops with the support of Habsburg mercenaries, due to the "negligent procedure" of its castellan. However Charles crushed the Kőszegis' rebellion by May 1319 and Ludbregi was able to recapture Béla for the Priory of Vrana by the end of the year, as prior Philip of Gragnana reported in April 1320, who also donated the land of Chernech to Ludbregi as compensation for his past expenditure. Nicholas Ludbregi recaptured his seat Ludbreg from the Kőszegis in 1320.

Despite the Kőszegis' revolt was crushed, attacks against the villages of the Diocese of Zagreb continued as Pope John XXII urged the bishops of Pécs, Bosnia and Knin to excommunicate the attackers in a decree on 1 October 1319. The main organizer of these raids was Hector Gárdony in the service of Ban John Babonić. Hector made alliance with hospes of Kőrös (Križevci) County to attack the Čazma and Dubrava districts belonged to the diocese by ravaging its lands, looting goods and capturing prisoners. Ludbregi and his army entered Križevci and freed the captives. Following that his troops plundered the land of Blezna which belonged to Petres, a familial of Hector Gárdony. Petres himself was wounded and imprisoned. In May 1322, Hector, now as ispán of Kőrös County, attacked one of Ludbregi's estates and destroyed the local monastery dedicated to Saint Clement of Rome. After a series of plundering actions against the nearby villages, Hector gathered his army and besieged and captured Ludbreg Castle during a brief skirmish. Nicholas Ludbregi filed a lawsuit against Hector Gárdony before judge royal Lampert Hermán in October 1322. Meanwhile, Hector's patron John Babonić was dismissed and lost all political influence. Nicholas Ludbregi was able to recapture his seat by the end of the year, while Hector Gárdony was sentenced to death in absentia, but later acquitted by Charles, despite Ludbregi's protest.

Nicholas Ludbregi married Tetis Bednyai, formerly also a wife of Ladislaus Visnyei, and was first mentioned by a charter in 1351. Nicholas Ludbregi died without male heirs in 1357, thus his family became extinct after two generations. His lands reverted to the Royal Crown. King Louis I of Hungary donated his villages in Zala County to Benedict Debrentei in 1358, while Ban John Csúz received the estates of Ludbreg, Bistrica and Zelina on 19 January 1359. After that his family was also called "Ludbregi".

== Sources ==
- B. Halász, Éva (2009). "Adalékok I. Károly király országegyesítő harcaihoz a Drávántúlon [Details on The Unification Struggles of Charles I in Trans-Drava]". In Körmendi, Tamás; Thoroczkay, Gábor (eds.). Auxilium Historiae. Tanulmányok a hetvenesztendős Bertényi Iván tiszteletére (in Hungarian). Faculty of Arts, Eötvös Loránd University. pp. 21–25. ISBN 978-963-284-105-2.
- Engel, Pál (1996). Magyarország világi archontológiája, 1301–1457, I. [Secular Archontology of Hungary, 1301–1457, Volume I] (in Hungarian). História, MTA Történettudományi Intézete. ISBN 963-8312-44-0.
