= Moravče, Croatia =

Moravče
- Village
- Location within Croatia
- Coordinates: 45.936592°N 16.167609°E
- Country: Croatia
- County: City of Zagreb
- City District: Sesvete

Area
  - Total: 2.7 sq mi (6.9 km^{2})

Population (2021)
  - Total: 602
  - Density: 230/sq mi (87/km^{2})
- Time zone: UTC+1 (CET)
  - Summer (DST): UTC+2 (CEST)

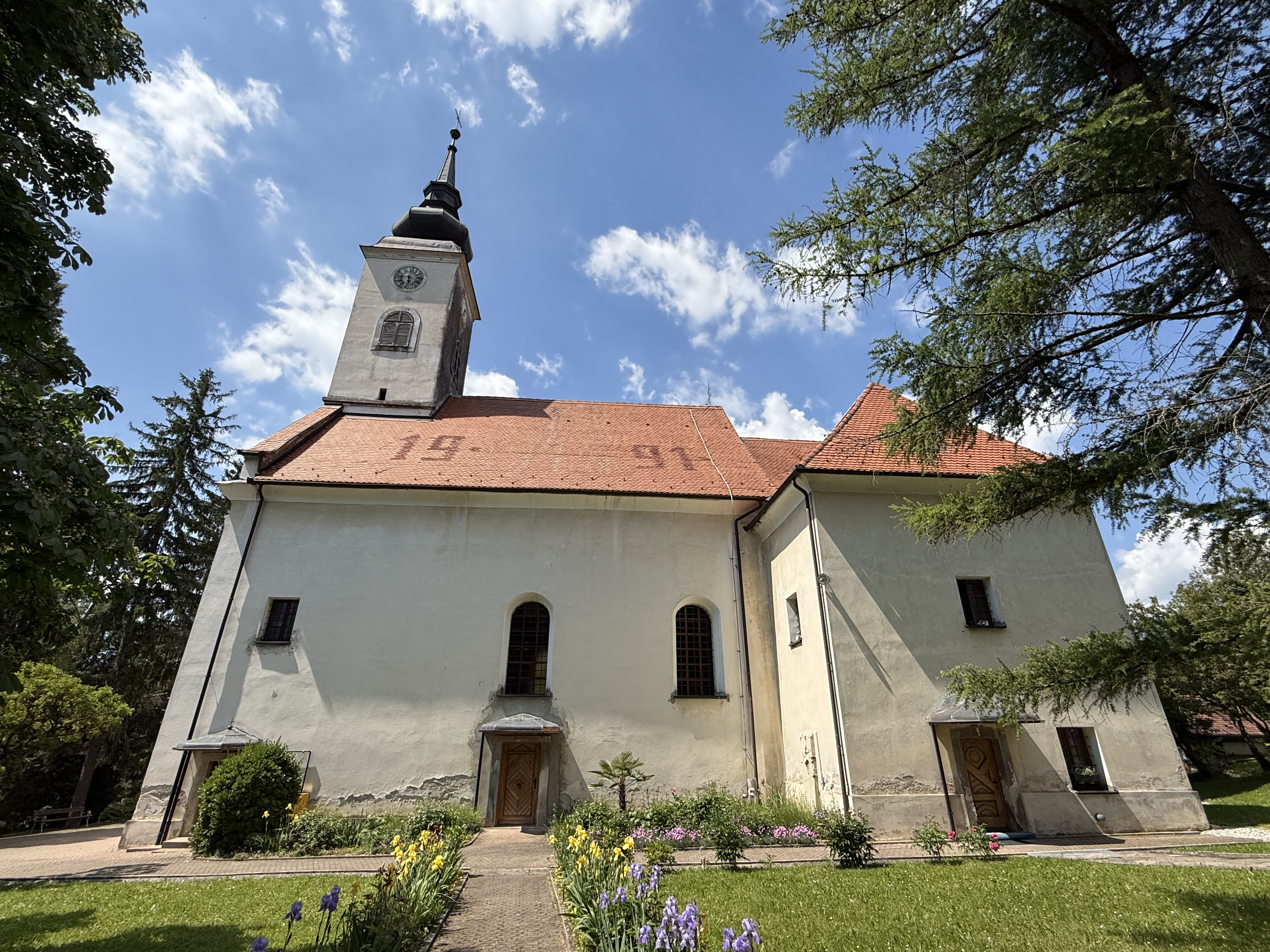
Parish Church of the Holy Trinity in Zagreb (Moravče)

Moravče is a village in Croatia. It is formally a settlement (naselje) of Zagreb, the capital of Croatia.

== Demographics ==
According to the 2021 census, its population was 602, down from 728 according in 2001.

== Climate ==
temperate oceanic climate, with warm summers and cold to mild winters. Temperatures range from around −3 °C in winter to 26 °C in summer. Rainfall occurs throughout the year, peaking in spring and early summer, while snowfall is common from January to April. Summer days are long and sunny, whereas daylight is shortest in December.
