= Felpéc =

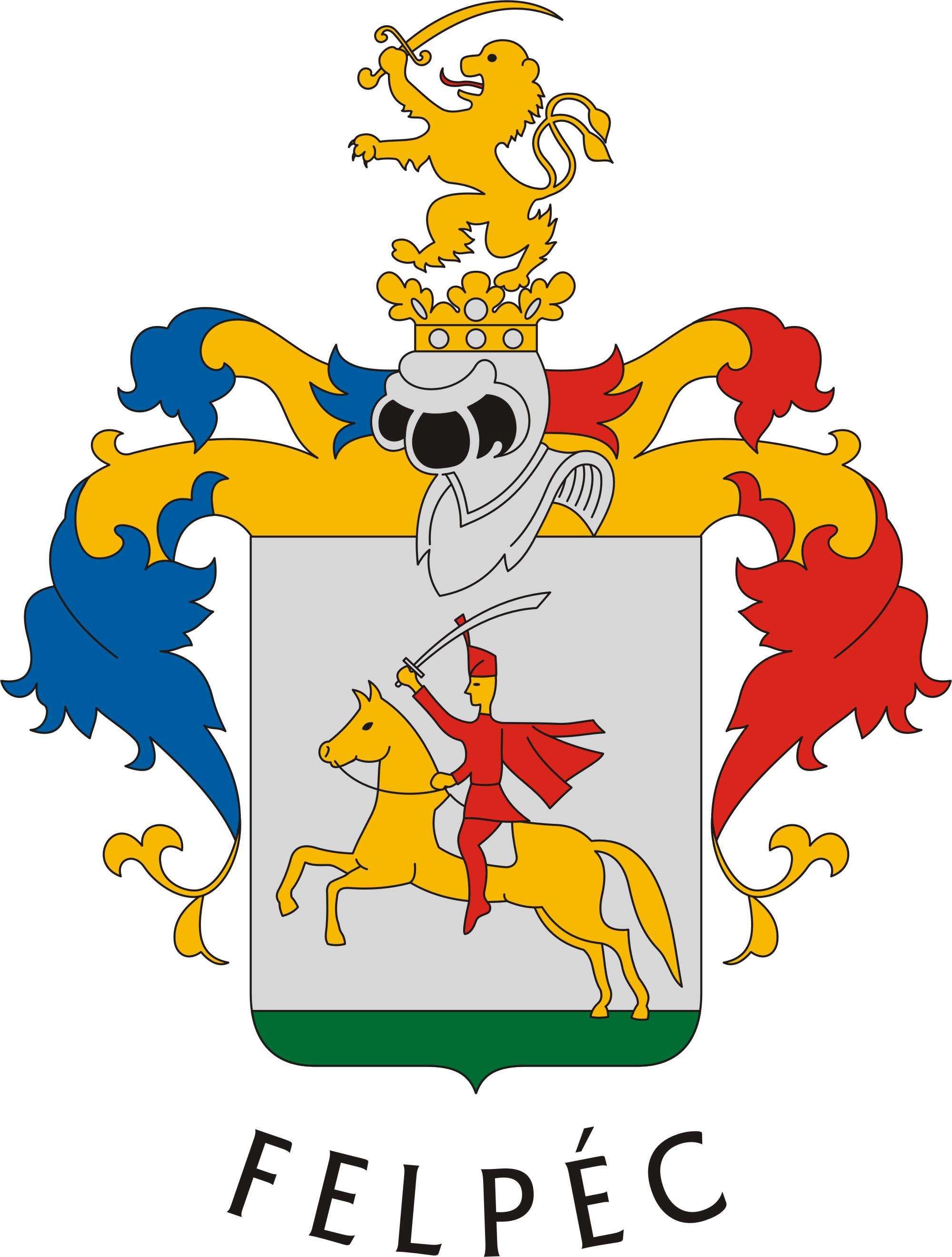
- Coat of arms

- Location of Győr-Moson-Sopron county in Hungary

- Location of Felpéc
- Coordinates: 47.52215°N 17.60019°E
- Country: Hungary
- County: Győr-Moson-Sopron

Area
  - Total: 22.47 km^{2} (8.68 sq mi)

Population (2004)
  - Total: 866
  - Density: 38.54/km^{2} (99.8/sq mi)
- Time zone: UTC+1 (CET)
  - Summer (DST): UTC+2 (CEST)
- Postal code: 9122
- Area code: 96

Felpéc is a village in Győr-Moson-Sopron county, Hungary. An organ of a pleasing tone was built in the Lutheran church (1620) of excellent acoustics. Primeval juniper nature conservation area especially suitable for walking tours.
