= Kajárpéc =

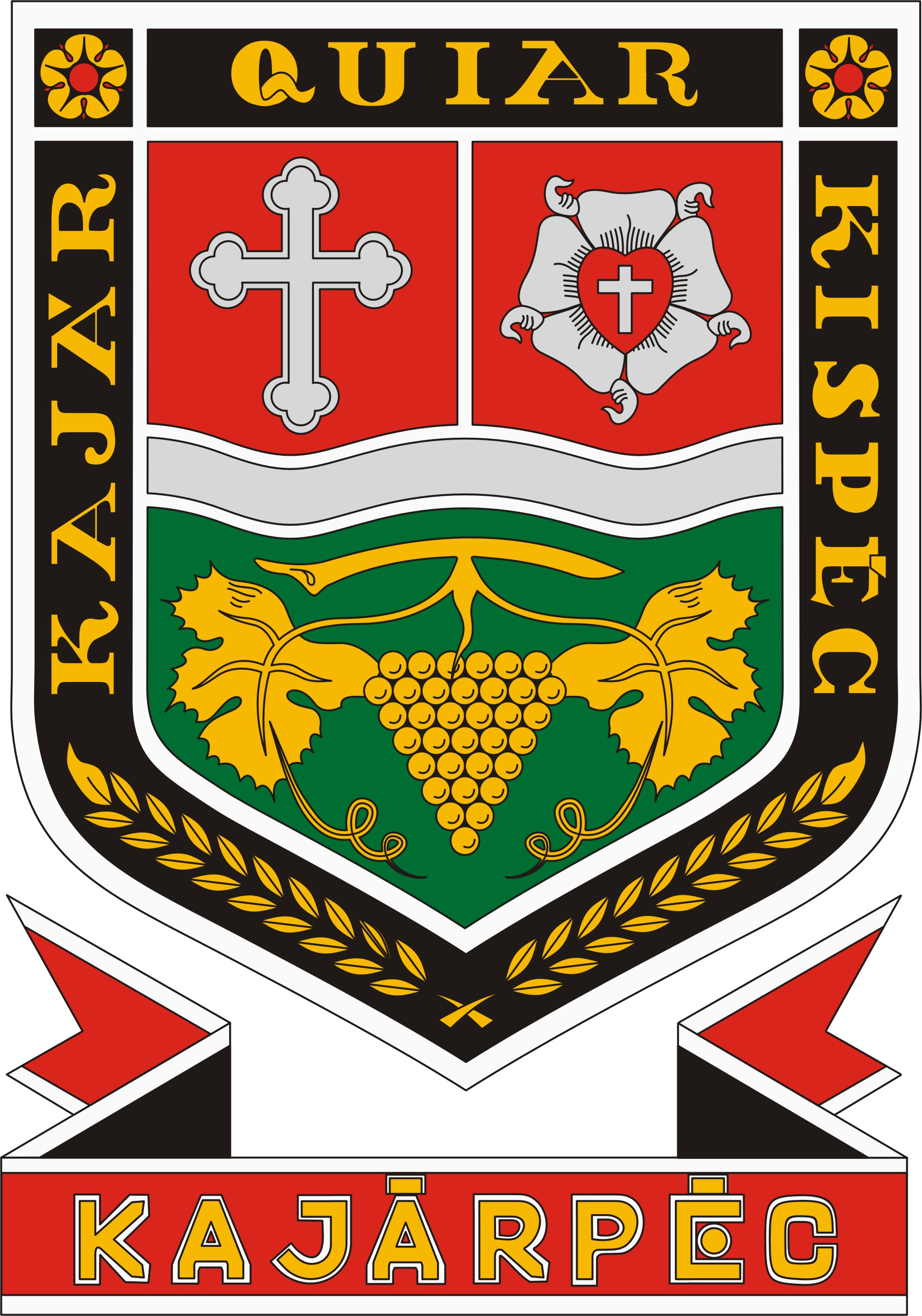
- Coat of arms

- Location of Győr-Moson-Sopron county in Hungary

- Location of Kajárpéc
- Coordinates: 47.48801°N 17.63436°E
- Country: Hungary
- County: Győr-Moson-Sopron

Area
  - Total: 31.89 km^{2} (12.31 sq mi)

Population (2004)
  - Total: 1,389
  - Density: 43.55/km^{2} (112.8/sq mi)
- Time zone: UTC+1 (CET)
  - Summer (DST): UTC+2 (CEST)
- Postal code: 9123
- Area code: 96

Kajárpéc is a village in Győr-Moson-Sopron county, Hungary.
