= Veszprém County (former) =

County of the Kingdom of Hungary

Veszprém County Comitatus Vesprimiensis (Latin) Veszprém vármegye (Hungarian) Komitat Wesprim (German)
- County of the Kingdom of Hungary
- 11th century–1946
- Coat of arms

- Capital: Veszprém
- Area
  - Coordinates: 47°5′N 17°55′E
  - 1910: 3,953 km^{2} (1,526 sq mi)
- Population
  - 1910: 229,776
- History
  - Established: 11th century
  - Monarchy abolished: 1946
- Today part of: Hungary

Veszprém was an administrative county (comitatus) of the Kingdom of Hungary. Its territory, which was smaller than that of present Veszprém county, in western Hungary. The capital of the county was Veszprém.

== Geography ==
Veszprém county shared borders with the Hungarian counties Vas, Sopron, Győr, Komárom, Fejér, Tolna, Somogy and Zala. It covered the Bakony hills, the eastern tip of Lake Balaton and the region southeast of the lake. The river Marcal formed its western border. Its area was 3953 km^{2} around 1910.

== History ==
Veszprém county arose as one of the first comitatuses of the Kingdom of Hungary, in the 11th century.

The city Siófok, which used to be in Somogy county before the 1850s, went back from Veszprém county to Somogy county before World War II. After World War II, the territory of Veszprém county was again modified: a small region west of Pápa, which used to be part of Vas county, and the northern shore of Lake Balaton, which used to be part of Zala county, were added. The region south-east of Lake Balaton (around Enying) went to Fejér county.

== Demographics ==
=== 1900 ===
In 1900, the county had a population of 222,024 people and was composed of the following linguistic communities:

Total:

- Hungarian: 187,160 (84,3%)
- German: 32,522 (14,6%)
- Slovak: 1,758 (0,8%)
- Romanian: 121 (0,1%)
- Croatian: 35 (0,0%)
- Serbian: 4 (0,0%)
- Ruthenian: 2 (0,0%)
- Other or unknown: 422 (0,2%)

According to the census of 1900, the county was composed of the following religious communities:

Total:

- Roman Catholic: 143,192 (64,5%)
- Calvinist: 44,820 (20,2%)
- Lutheran: 24,393 (11,0%)
- Jewish: 9,343 (4,2%)
- Greek Catholic: 78 (0,0%)
- Greek Orthodox: 98 (0,1%)
- Unitarian: 52 (0,0%)
- Other or unknown: 48 (0,0%)

=== 1910 ===
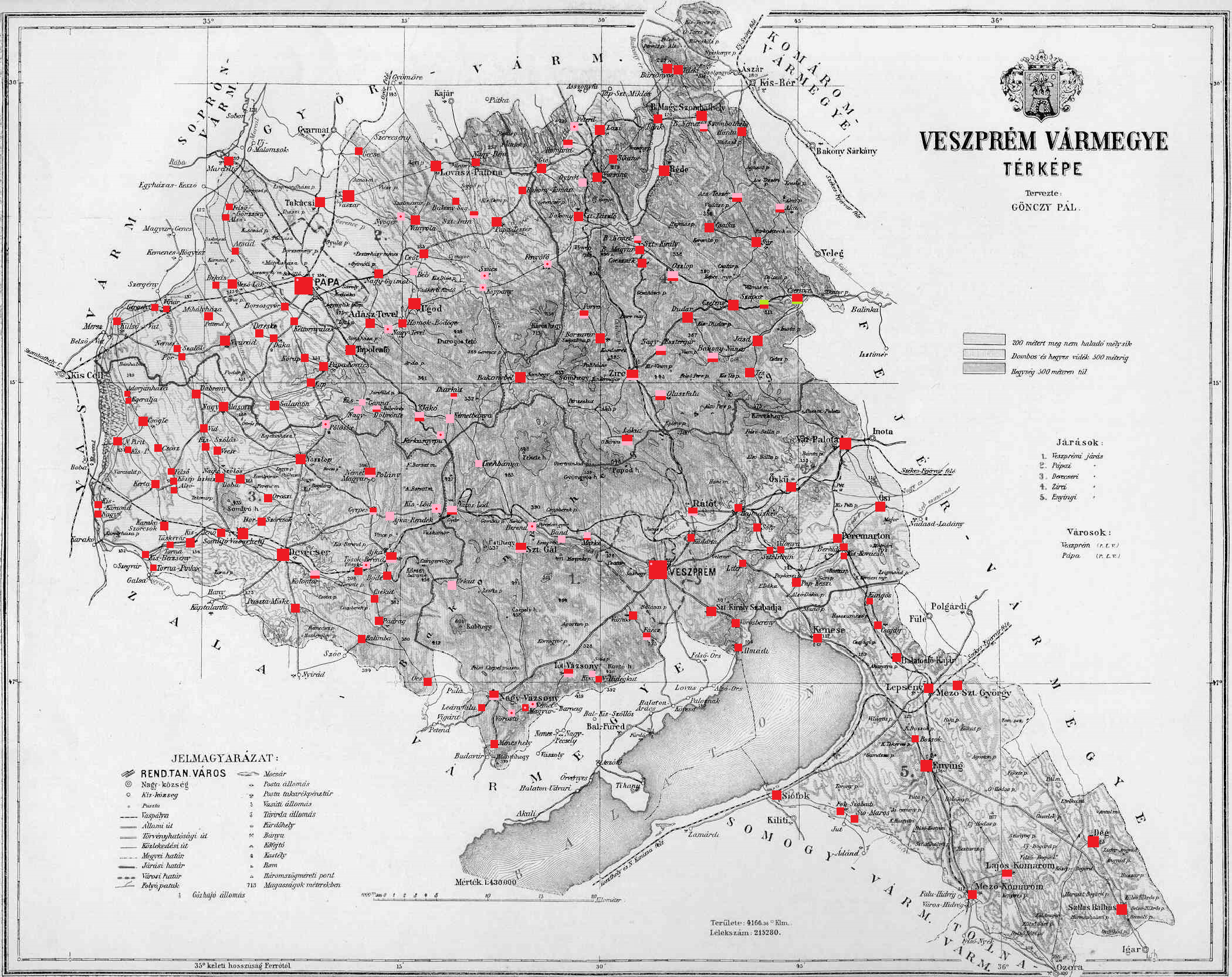
Ethnic map of the county with data of the 1910 census (see the key in the description).

In 1910, the county had a population of 229,776 people and was composed of the following linguistic communities:

Total:

- Hungarian: 199,063 (86.63%)
- German: 29,283 (12.74%)
- Slovak: 917 (0.4%)
- Croatian: 55 (0.02%)
- Romanian: 41 (0.02%)
- Serbian: 17 (0.01%)
- Ruthenian: 5 (0.0%)
- Other or unknown: 395 (0.17%)

According to the census of 1910, the county was composed of the following religious communities:

Total:

- Roman Catholic: 151,831 (66.08%)
- Calvinist: 44,507 (19.37%)
- Lutheran: 24,905 (10.84%)
- Jewish: 8,282 (3.6%)
- Greek Catholic: 106 (0.05%)
- Greek Orthodox: 61 (0.03%)
- Unitarian: 57 (0.02%)
- Other or unknown: 27 (0.01%)

== Subdivisions ==
In the early 20th century, the subdivisions of Veszprém county were:

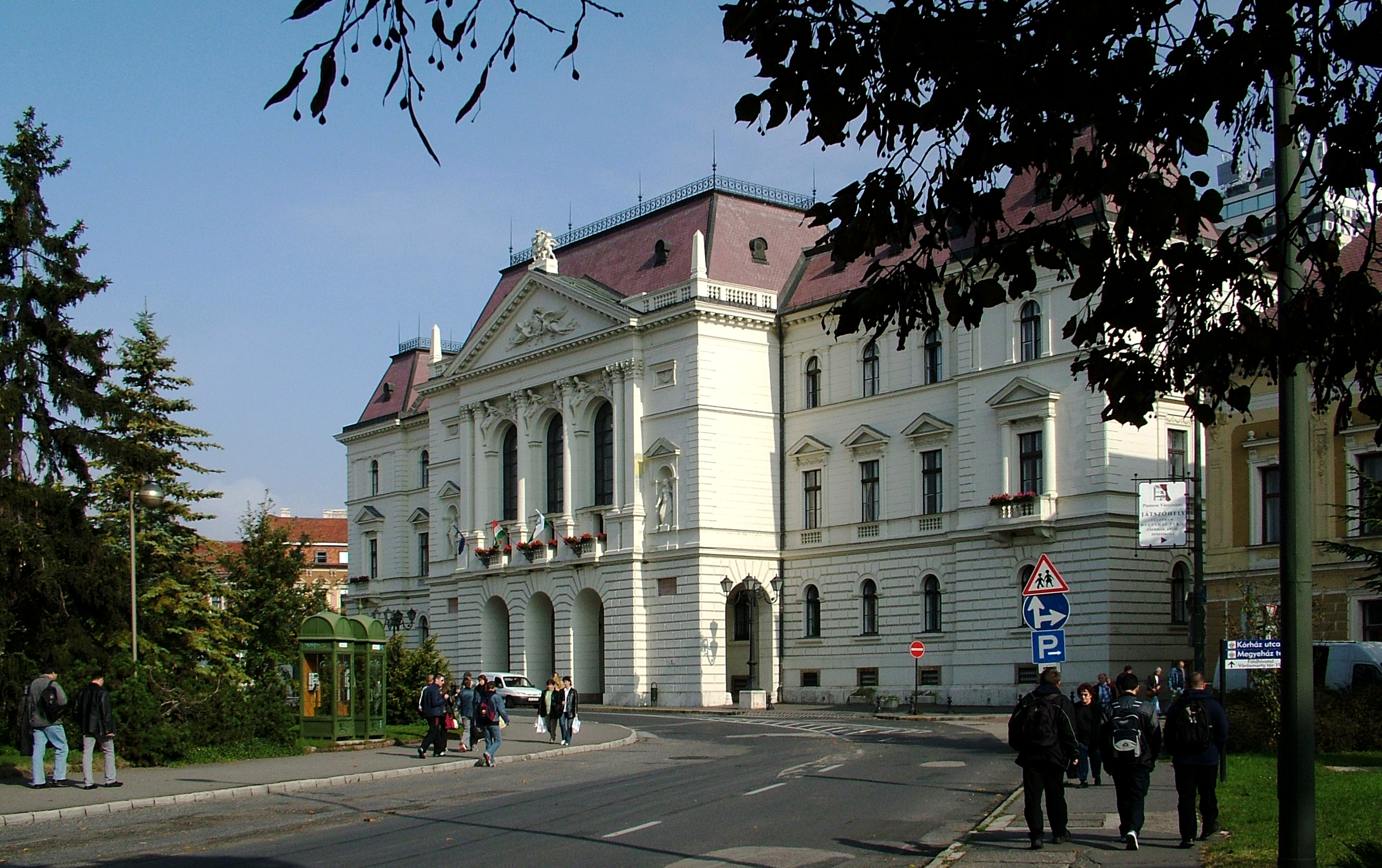
County Hall, Veszprém

Districts (járás)
District	Capital
Devecser	Devecser
Enying	Enying
Pápa	Pápa
Veszprém	Veszprém
Zirc	Zirc
Urban districts (rendezett tanácsú város)
Pápa
Veszprém
