= Master of the cupbearers =

The master of the cupbearers or master of the cup-bearers (German: Königliche Oberst-Grossmundschenke, Hungarian: főpohárnok, Slovak: pohárnik and Latin: pincernarum regalium magistri or magister pincernarum) was one of the high officials of the royal household in the Kingdom of Hungary. Masters of the cupbearers were included among the "true barons" of the realm from around 1220.

== Sources ==
- Engel, Pál (2001). The Realm of St Stephen: A History of Medieval Hungary, 895–1526. I.B. Tauris Publishers. ISBN 1-86064-061-3.
- Fallenbüchl, Zoltán (1988). Magyarország főméltóságai ("High Dignitaries in Hungary") (in Hungarian). Maecenas Könyvkiadó. ISBN 963-02-5536-7.
- Stephen Werbőczy: The Customary Law of the Renowned Kingdom of Hungary in Three Parts (1517) (Edited and translated by János M. Bak, Péter Banyó and Martyn Rady with an introductory study by László Péter) (2005). Charles Schlacks, Jr. Publishers. ISBN 1-884445-40-3.
