= Transdanubia =

Traditional region of Hungary

Hungarian Transdanubia Dunántúl
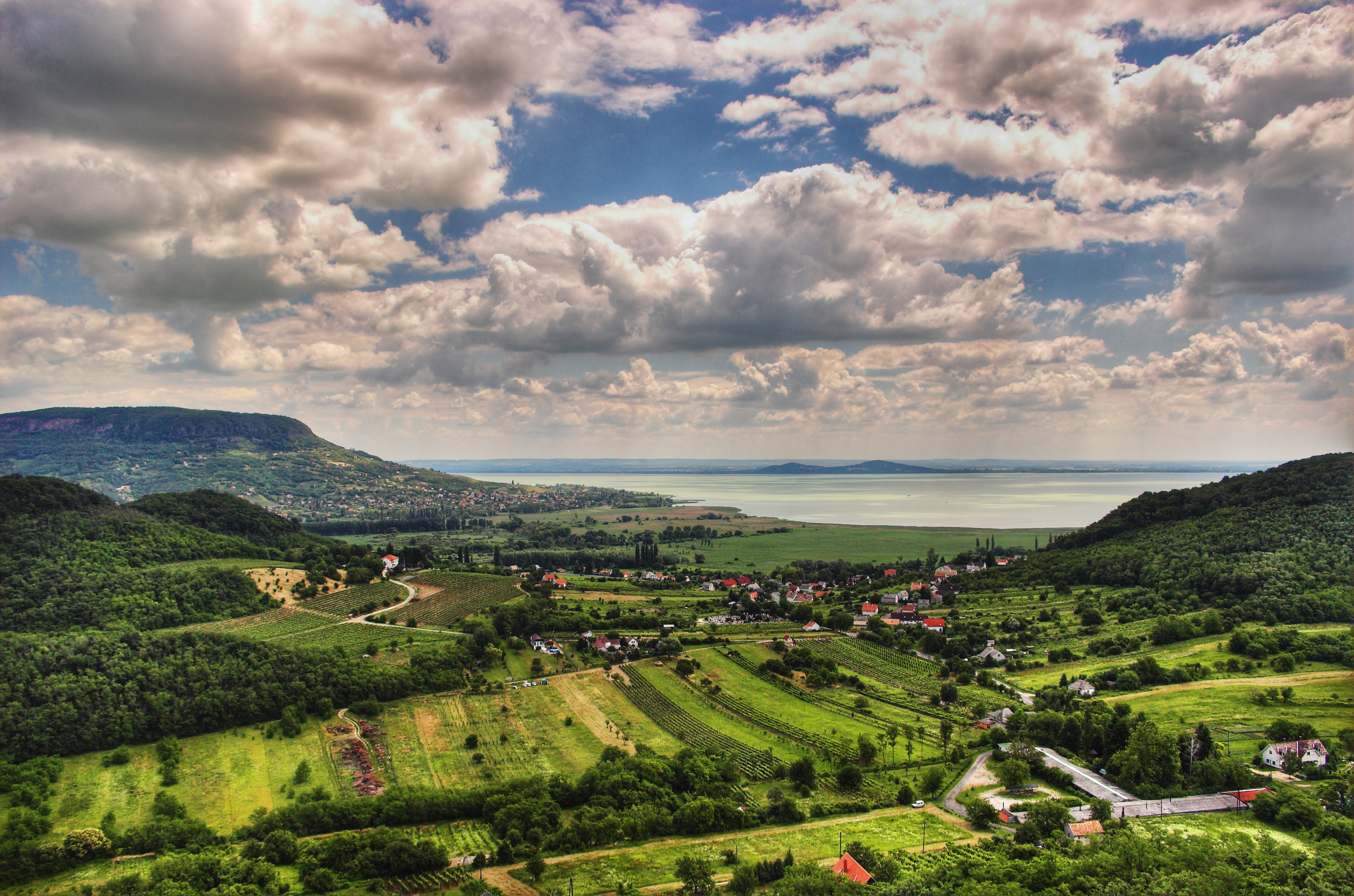
- Lake Balaton
- Location: Győr-Moson-Sopron, Komárom-Esztergom, Fejér, Veszprém, Vas, Zala, Somogy, Tolna, Baranya, Pest counties, Hungary

Area
  - Total: 38,000 km^{2} (15,000 sq mi)

Transdanubia (Hungarian: Dunántúl [ˈdunaːntuːl]; German: Transdanubien, Croatian: Prekodunavlje or Zadunavlje, Slovak: Zadunajsko) is a Hungarian geographical concept, varying in time according to the changing borders of Hungary during history. As such, it is a traditional region of Hungary, which is also referred to as Hungarian Pannonia, or Pannonian Hungary.

== Territory and administrative divisions ==
=== Traditional interpretation ===
The borders of Transdanubia are the Danube River (north and east), the Drava and Mura rivers (south), and the foothills of the Alps roughly along the border between Hungary and Austria (west).

Transdanubia comprises the counties of Győr-Moson-Sopron, Komárom-Esztergom, Fejér, Veszprém, Vas, Zala, Somogy, Tolna, Baranya and the part of Pest that lies west of the Danube. (In the early Middle Ages the latter was known as Pilis county.)

This article deals with Transdanubia in this geographical meaning.

=== Territorial changes ===
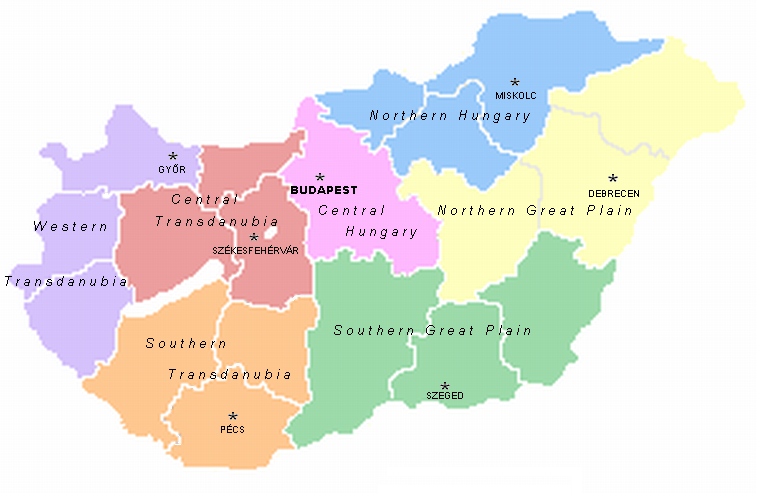
Regions in Hungary. The three Transdanubian regions in the west are shown in red, orange, and lavender.

Transdanubia is essentially a Hungarian geographical concept, so its meaning varies in time, as it applies only to areas within the borders of Hungary during each specific historical period.

While the northern, eastern and southern borders of the region are clearly marked by the Danube and Drava rivers, the western border was always identical with the political boundary of Hungary, therefore it was affected by the territorial changes of the 20th century. Before the Treaty of Trianon in 1920 the present-day regions of Burgenland, Prekmurje and Međimurje were integral parts of Transdanubia. The three villages of Rusovce, Jarovce and Čunovo also belonged to Transdanubia before the Paris Peace Treaty in 1947. These areas ceased to be parts of Transdanubia when they became part of the neighbouring countries.

=== EU regions ===
Transdanubia is a NUTS territorial unit in the European Union, consisting of Central Transdanubia, Western Transdanubia and Southern Transdanubia (see NUTS:HU). Pest county and Budapest belong to the region of Central Hungary. It has an area of 36,610 km^{2} (14,140 sq mi) and a population of 2,871,756 (1 January 2025).

== Geography ==
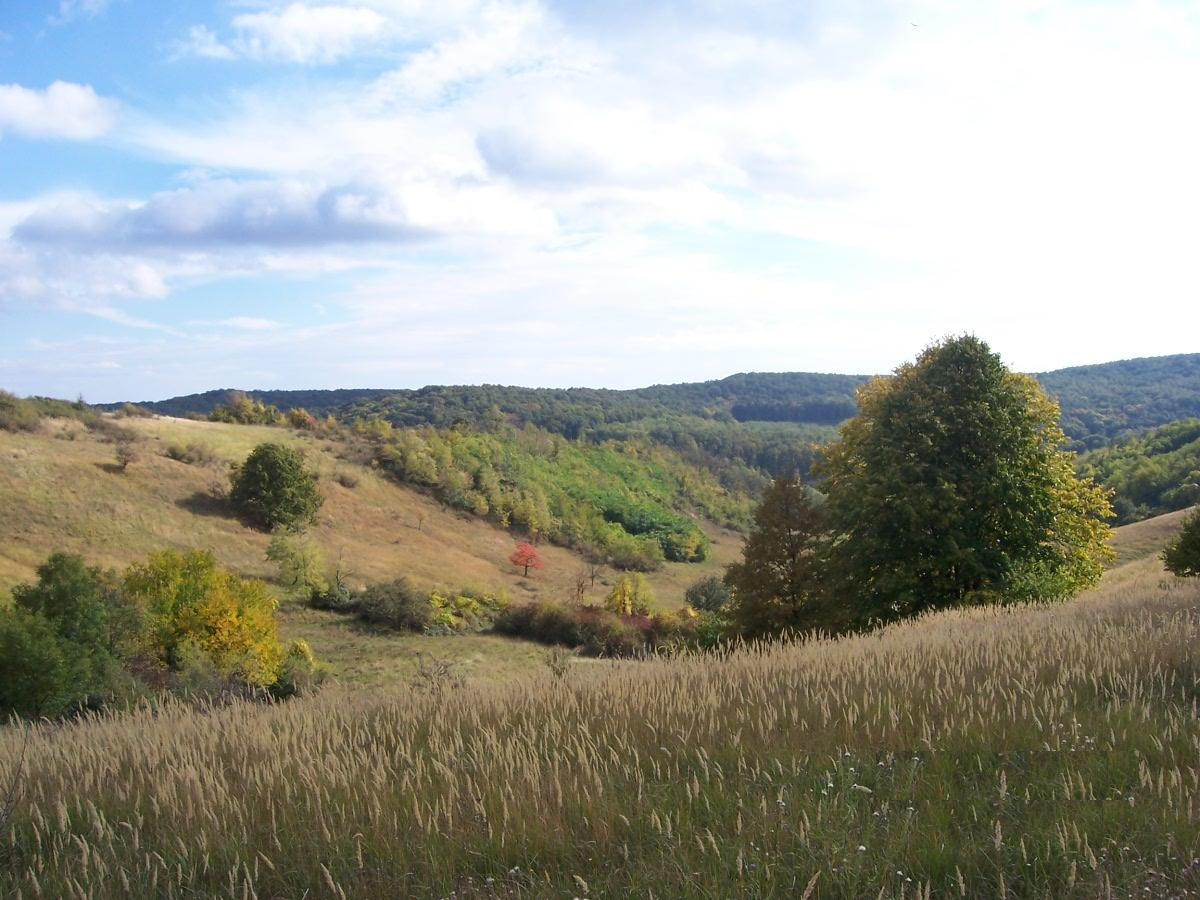
Hills in Baranya County, Hungary

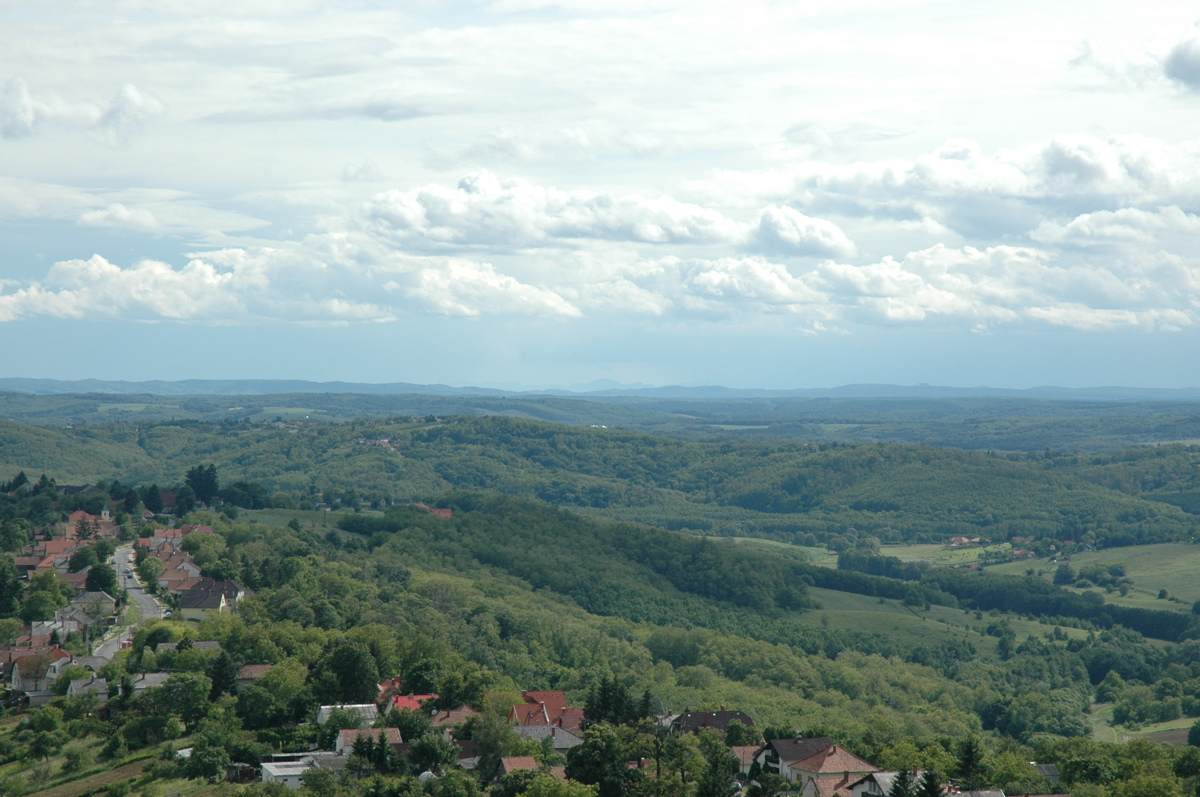

The territory of the region is 38,000 km^{2}, and it comprises almost half of the whole territory of Hungary. In terms of historical geography it also comprised major part of northern Pannonia, and thus the term Hungarian Pannonia refers to this region. The terrain is very varied with gentle hills, valleys, basins, mountains and plains. The main geographical formations are the Transdanubian Mountains, the southern half of the Little Alföld, the Alpokalja, the Transdanubian Hills, and the Mezőföld (part of the Great Alföld). The main rivers are the Danube, Drava, Rába, Zala, and Kapos. In the middle of Transdanubia lies the biggest freshwater lake of Central Europe, the Lake Balaton. Other importants lakes are the Lake Velence and the Lake Fertő.

== History ==
=== Historical territory and counties (11th c.-1920) ===
Historically the counties of Transdanubia were Moson, Győr, Sopron, Vas, Zala, Veszprém, Fejér, Komárom, Esztergom, Somogy, Tolna and Baranya. They comprised the so called Districtus Trans-Danubianus from the beginnings of the 18th century. The boundaries of these counties, established by Stephen I of Hungary, remained unchanged for almost 900 years until 1920.

=== Ancient history ===
Transdanubia has been populated since the Stone Age. Between 10 BCE and 434 CE, it was part of the Roman Empire. With some present-day Austrian and Croatian territories, it comprised the Province of Pannonia, a romanised, Latin-speaking border region with important Roman towns (Scarbantia, Aquincum, Sopianae, Gorsium, Savaria) and rural villas.

=== Middle Ages ===
In the Age of Migrations it was occupied by the Huns, Ostrogoths, Lombards, Gepids, Avars, Franks and the Slavic peoples. In 900 Pannonia was occupied by the Magyars and after 1000 became part of the Kingdom of Hungary.

Transdanubia has been one of the most important regions of Hungary since the 11th century. Esztergom has been the ecclesiastical capital of the country since 1001 until today, and Stephen I of Hungary established his royal seat at Székesfehérvár, later the coronation town of the kings. Transdanubia was also the cradle of the Hungarian higher education. The first college was established in Veszprém, and the first university was established in Pécs in 1367. Other important medieval cities were Veszprém, Pécs, Győr and Sopron. After the devastating Mongol invasion (see Mongol invasion of Europe) new castles were built, and King Béla IV of Hungary established a new royal capital at Buda, next to the Danube. The region's rich medieval heritage is seen everywhere from the little village churches to the old castles, monasteries and town houses.

=== Early modern times ===
In the Ottoman era (16th-17th centuries), the eastern and southern part of Transdanubia came under Turkish rule. The ever changing border ran along the Transdanubian Mountains and the southern shore of the Lake Balaton. The dangerous border was guarded by frontier-fortresses (végvár), the most important of which were Győr and Nagykanizsa. The Asian-style Ottoman rule and the constant war had devastating effects: dozens of villages were destroyed, the population was decimated and parts of the region became almost totally deserted. The territories belonging to the Royal Hungary (except the border regions) were more lucky, because the European-like developments were continuous. Here the 17th century was the period of the Catholic Counter-Reformation, the fights for national independence from the Habsburgs and the formation of a new, powerful Catholic aristocracy.

In 1686 the allied Habsburg, Polish and Bavarian army reconquered Buda and terminated the Ottoman rule. In the 18th century the region was slowly rebuilt, and many new settlers (Magyars, Germans, Poles, Slovaks, and Croatians) arrived. Famous baroque castles were built to show the power of the big landowner families, for example the Esterházys in Fertőd and the Festetics in Keszthely. The baroque townscape of the cities survived until today in Győr, Székesfehérvár, Pécs, etc.

In the 19th century Trandanubia underwent a capitalist development. Due to its closeness of Austria it became again the richest part of the country, and – at least after the public opinion – more "European" and Western-like than any other region of Hungary or most regions of post-communist Central Europe.

=== Modern times ===
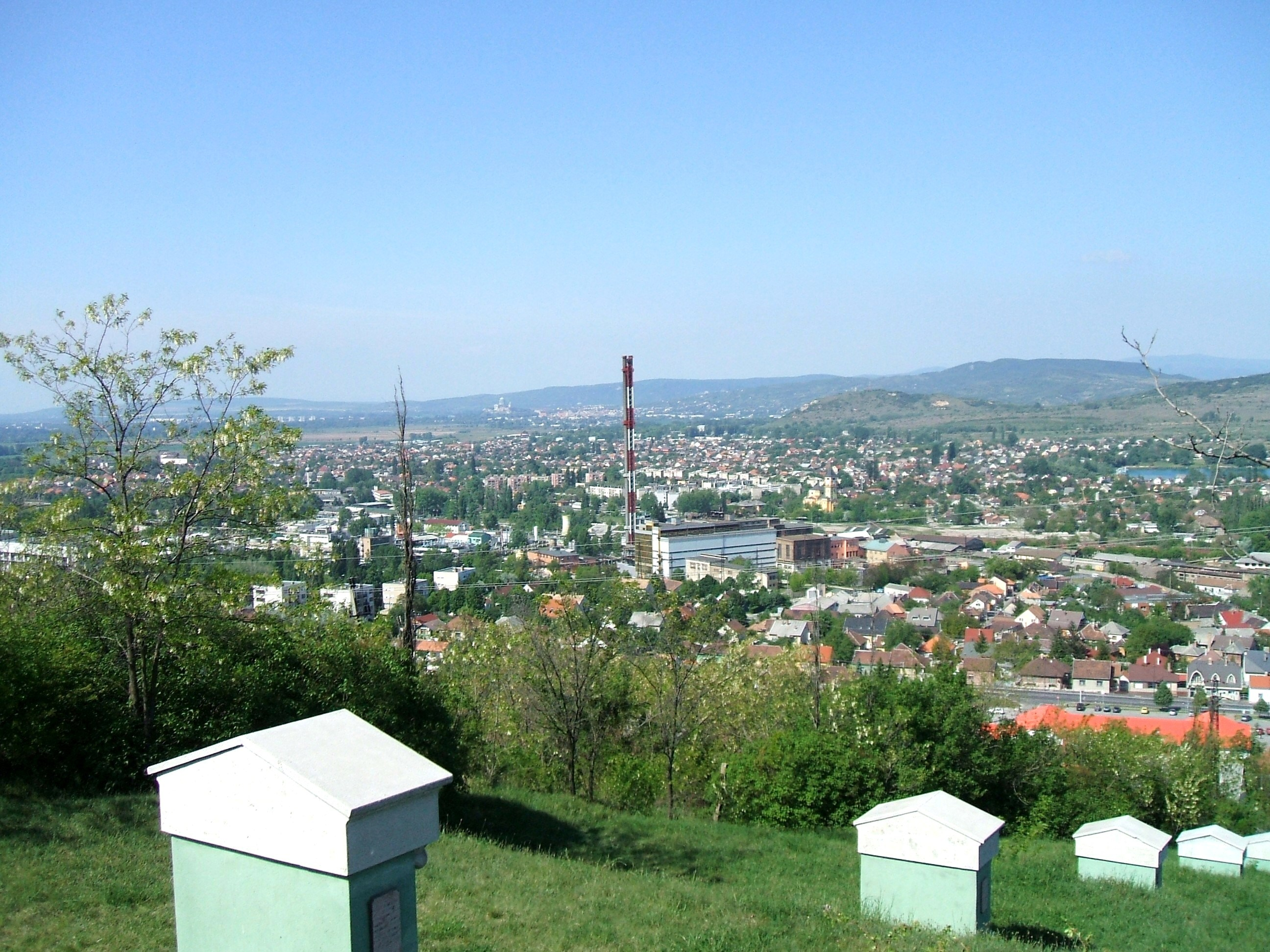
Dorog, a small industrial town

Under the People's Republic of Hungary (1949–1989), new industrial cities were built at Tatabánya, Dunaújváros, Ajka and Komló, and new industries and factories were established, for example Hungary's only atomic power plant at Paks. In Pécs, uranium was mined and big industrial suburbs were built. One of the most famous plant of Socialist Hungary, the Ikarus Bus was established in Székesfehérvár. After the fall of socialism, northern Transdanubia was more successful at adapting to the new economic situation than other parts of Hungary (except Budapest) and most of the foreign investment came here to help the radical economic renewal. In the 1990s, Székesfehérvár was counted as probably the economically most successful Hungarian town. Esztergom, Győr and Szentgotthárd became centers of the automobile industry with the establishment of the Suzuki, Audi and Opel factories. On the other hand, some rural regions remained impoverished, especially in Southern Transdanubia and along the River Drave.

== See also ==
- Pannonia
- Lower Pannonian Principality
- Danube–Tisza Interfluve

== Notes ==
- Transdanubia can also refer to the 21st and 22nd districts of Vienna, which are the only ones lying on the left bank (eastern side), of the Danube. See Floridsdorf and Donaustadt respectively.
