= Tétény (genus) =

Genus (gens) Tétény
- Country: Kingdom of Hungary
- Founded: early 13th century
- Founder: Marcellus I (or Ambrose)
- Cadet branches: House of Pekri

Tétény (Thetun or Tetun; Croatian: Tetenj) was the name of a gens (Latin for "clan"; nemzetség in Hungarian) in the Kingdom of Hungary. Initially having roots in Central Hungary, they mostly possessed lands beyond the river Drava in the territory of Slavonia. The kinship reached its peak in the first third of the 13th century. The noble Pekri family descended from this clan.

== Name ==
The variant Thetun or Tetun appear first in contemporary records in 1294. A non-authentic charter from the third quarter of the 14th century also refer to the clan with these names. According to Croatian historian Antun Nekić, Thetun (Tétény or Tetenj) was a real or fictional ancestor of the kindred, however, no historical data has survived about him. According to the tradition, one of the seven chieftains of the Magyars during the Hungarian conquest of the Carpathian Basin was called Tétény or Töhötöm. By the early 13th century, the family centered around the estate Peker or Pukur nearby the namesake river in Slavonia, near present-day Daruvar in Croatia. The adjective form ("of Peker") gradually became a family name in the first half of the 14th century, and thereafter the kinship was known as Pekri family.

The entire Pekri family archives passed into the hands of the Batthyány family in the late 15th century, when Balthasar Batthyány came into the possession of the fort of Garignica (laid in present-day Berek, Croatia) and the documents concerning the estate and others. The Batthyány family archives successfully survived the centuries of Ottoman wars.

== History ==
=== Confidants of Andrew II ===
A non-authentic charter from the third quarter of the 14th century, allegedly dated 1228, is the first record, which contains genealogical data on the Tétény kindred. This forgery was preserved only in various copies (from e.g. 1383, 1407 and 1423), because it successfully passed the sieve of the royal court. By the early 13th century, the Téténys centered around Peker (or Pukur) and Osuvak in Slavonia. The disputes between the branches of the kinship over these estates created many forged documents (with the dates 1281 too).

While Hungarian historian János Karácsonyi rejected to utilize those genealogical data which appear in the 14th-century non-authentic charter, Antun Nekić argued the text perhaps contains useful information regarding the Tétény kindred. When Ladislaus I Pekri requested the confirmation of the document in 1423, he listed five generations above him, up to Ban Peter II, and then he only stated that Marcellus II, Michael and Benedict were the ancestors of him and his brothers and cousins. The origin of the Tétény clan is unknown. Slovak historian Ján Lukačka claimed they were belonged to one of the branches of the extended Hont-Pázmány clan from Upper Hungary. Antun Nekić opposed this viewpoint. It is plausible they possessed the initial ancient landholdings around Tétény in Central Hungary (present-day Budafok-Tétény, a southwest district of Budapest), including Sóskút and Tordas. Some historians – János Karácsonyi, Pál Engel and Ján Lukačka – considered Marcellus I is the earliest known member of the clan, who fathered five sons (see below), since Peter is referred to as the son of Marcellus during a lawsuit in 1228. However, another brother Fabian was called as the son of a certain Ambrose.

By the reign of Andrew II (r. 1205–1235), three brothers – Marcellus, Peter I and Abraham – emerged to become stable pillars in the royal court. For his faithful service, Marcellus was granted landholdings and estates across the Drava (including the extended lordship of Peker and the surrounding Osuvak), which he tried to expand by purchasing. Thereafter the province Slavonia became the center and the main seat of the genus in the following centuries. Marcellus served as Judge royal twice (1207, 1211–1212) and administered various counties simultaneously. Marcellus' political influence is well reflected by the fact that Peter I, also a baron of Andrew II, was usually styled as "frater Marcelli" or "germanus Marcelli". Peter I was count (head) of the queen's court from 1229 to 1230. Before 1228, he was involved in a lawsuit with the Vajk kindred over a possession called Keresztúr, which laid between Peker and Toplica (present-day a borough of Daruvar in Croatia). During the trial, certain Arnold, son of Peterd and Leucus, son of Deschen were mentioned as Peter's relatives. Despite Marcellus did not hold any offices after 1213, he was still alive in 1232 and 1233. Together with Abraham, he sued members of the Hont-Pázmány clan for the land Toplica, but they lost the case. Marcellus was referred to as the king's "former" chamberlain in 1233.

It is possible that neither Marcellus nor Peter outlived Andrew's death. When Béla IV of Hungary ascended the throne in 1235, the monarch set up special commissions which revised all royal charters of land grants made after 1196 and began to supervise "useless and superfluous perpetual grants" made by his late father. Béla's brother Coloman, Duke of Slavonia confiscated all of their younger brother Abraham's inherited estates (including Aszuág and Gajul). He also handed over his all purchased estates beyond the river Drava in the area east of Đakovo – Daróc (present-day Vardarac, Croatia), Ködmen (Cudmend), Rücs (Ručevo) and Donát in Valkó County – to the duke, thus he was able to retain his portion in the inherited lordship of Peker. Coloman confirmed his right of ownership over the estate in 1237. Abraham died without issue sometime after 1239. His unidentified widow, bequeathed her dower, the estate Peker to the Dominican nunnery at Margaret Island, which she probably entered. This was paid by Peter's descendants in amount of 40 marks in 1286 after a lengthy dispute. Nekić argued Abraham was the son of Marcellus (II) and not his brother.

Fabian sold the village Sóskút laid nearby Tétény in Fejér County to Andrew II for 30 marks sometime before 1233 (in that year Andrew II donated the village to Nana Nánabeszter). Fabian activities can be discerned through the long-term dispute he managed with the Benedictines from Pannonhalma Abbey, says in a document from 1234 that, since he did not have a seal himself, he borrowed one from his brother Marcellus. During this conflict, Fabian was excommunicated, but he did not renounce the possessions he allegedly took by royal order. After 1235, when the Tétény clan became disgraced, the dispute seems to have been concluded very quickly in favor of the Pannonhalma Abbey. The fifth brother Demetrius acted as co-judge beside the king in 1232, on the occasion of a lawsuit. He was mentioned among the barons of the kingdom as "friar Marceli"; Demetrius may have been in the position of ispán of Varaždin County at that time until 1234.

=== During the feudal anarchy ===
Of the five brothers, only Peter I had descendants through his only known son Benedict. After the 1230s, the Tétény clan disappeared from contemporary records for the upcoming four decades. Benedict had three sons, Peter II, Paul I and Kemény. The kinship came to the fore again due to the rapid political rise of Peter II during the era of so-called feudal anarchy in the 1270–1280s. Initially, Peter and his family were subjected by Joachim Gutkeled, who administered a considerable part of Slavonia during the reign of Ladislaus IV. Peter distinguished himself in various battles against Bohemia in the 1270s. Following the death of Joachim in 1277, he became a strong partisan of the monarch, even during the harsh conflict with the Holy See. He served as Ban of Slavonia three times (1279–1280, 1280 and 1283). In his last years, he was a confidant of queen mother Elizabeth the Cuman. He married an unidentified noblewoman from the Siklós branch of the gens Kán. It is plausible that Peter was that family member, who built the castle of Dobra Kuća (Hungarian: Dobrakucsa), laid near Daruvar, on the top of the Papuk mountain, which later became a royal property in 1335.

At the end of 1278, Conrad Győr filed a lawsuit against Paul I due to a damage estimated at 200 marks that the latter caused him in the village of Thopoz in Baranya County. Palatine Matthew Csák ruled in favor of Conrad and ordered that Conrad should be brought into Paul's estate Sveti Đurađ (Scentgurg or Szentgyörgy), which was opposed by Paul's brothers, Peter II and Kemény. Despite the verdict, the estate remained in the hands of the Tétény clan, possibly due to Peter's political rise, who thus was able to protect family interests very successfully. During Ladislaus' imprisonment in January 1280, Paul attempted to free the monarch with an armed force, but he failed. For their loyalty during his imprisonment, Ladislaus IV donated the estates Aszuág (Ozyag; in the area between present-day Donji Miholjac és Sveti Đurađ in Croatia) and Gajul on the bank of river Ilova to Peter and his brothers in April 1281; both lands were formerly considered inherited estates of the Tétény clan, but were confiscated and attached to Baranya County during the ascension of Béla IV.

Peter II died sometime between 1283 and 1286. Among the three siblings, only Peter had descendants, later known as the Pekri family. After a lengthy dispute, his sons – Lawrence and Nicholas – appeared before the collegiate chapter of Buda (a place of authentication) on behalf of their uncle Kemény in 1286, and paid off the dower (i.e. a portion in Peker estate) of the unidentified widow of the late Abraham to the Dominican nunnery at Margaret Island, in accordance with her last will. Instead of handing over the estate, they paid its equivalent of 40 marks. Paul was still alive too during the agreement. He was obliged to pay 12 oxen to the nuns on account of the damage he caused in the village of the nuns called Samud. In exchange, the nuns renounced any pretensions to the Peker property and returned to Kemény all documents relating the estate which were in the possession of Abraham' widow until her death.

Kemény and his nephews swore loyalty to the new king Andrew III in 1290. Upon their request, the monarch confirmed their right of ownership over Aszuág in October 1290, despite that the influential Kórógyi family (John, son of Ladislaus) also laid claim to the property. The subsequent years were characterized by a constant struggle between the two families over the estates located in northern Slavonia (in Baranya and Križevci counties). The Kórógyis – Philip and Demetrius – protested against their elder half-brother John, who had control of the Barázda estate (near Osijek) to the exclusion of his family members with Lawrence and Nicholas in 1294 (i.e. Kemény died by then). During the conflict between the Kórógyis and Pekris, Lawrence sought assistance from his maternal cousins, Julius and Peter Siklósi, who financially supported him to recover Aszuág. In response, Lawrence donated two villages called Sygwyr within Aszuág lordship to the brothers prior to 1296, but later Lawrence expelled Peter's servants, attempting to reclaim the settlements for himself.

From 1304, Lawrence was embroiled into conflict with James Győr, also a prominent landowner in the region, and his distant relative Sayan Győr. The dispute was conducted before the oligarch Henry Kőszegi, the undisputed ruler of Slavonia during the era of interregnum (1301–1310). The reason for the dispute is the destruction of an undisclosed property, the capture of people, and other atrocities committed by the warring parties, which apparently reached the amount of 20 marks, on the basis of which James, together with Sayan, was to take an oath before Henry. However, at the moment when they came before the ban's court on the scheduled date, the quarreling parties reconciled and forgave each other for all the damages they had caused. The political decisions of Lawrence in the last decade of the 13th and the first decade of the 14th century depended to a large extent on the geographical location of his possessions; Peker stood in the space between the sphere of Henry Kőszegi in the north, Ugrin Csák in the east, and the Babonići in the south. Aszuág was also located on the border between two oligarchic territories: Ugrin Csák in the south, while on the other sides it was surrounded by the sphere under the rule and influence of the Kőszegis. Such distribution of possessions largely determined the connection between Lawrence and the Kőszegis, which can be seen most tangibly in the example from 1304, when both parties acknowledged Henry's judicial court. Lawrence married an unidentified daughter of Paul Visontai from the illustrious Aba kindred. He left behind four sons – Peter III, Dominic, Leucus, Paul II – and a daughter, Catherine. They were already referred to as the Pekri family. Peter and Paul established the two branches of the kinship.

== Family tree ==
According to Karácsonyi & Engel

- Marcellus I
  - Marcellus II (fl. 1206–1233)
  - Peter I (fl. 1221–1233)
    - Benedict
      - Paul I (fl. 1281–1286)
      - Peter II (fl. 1281–1283)
        - Lawrence (fl. 1286–1304) ∞ N Visontai
          - Pekri family
        - Nicholas (fl. 1286–1294)
      - Kemény (fl. 1281–1290)
  - Abraham (fl. 1232–1239) ∞ N (d. before 1286)
  - Demetrius (fl. 1232)
  - Fabian (fl. 1233)

According to Nekić

- Ambrose
  - Marcellus (fl. 1206–1233)
    - Abraham (fl. 1232–1239) ∞ N (d. before 1286)
  - Peter I (fl. 1221–1233)
    - Benedict
      - Paul I (fl. 1279–1286)
      - Peter II (fl. 1279–1283) ∞ N Siklósi
        - Lawrence (fl. 1286–1304) ∞ N Visontai
          - Pekri family
        - Nicholas (fl. 1286–1294)
      - Kemény (fl. 1281–1290)
    - a daughter ∞ Demetrius Kuzmin
  - Fabian (fl. 1228–1235)
  - Demetrius (fl. 1232)

== Sources ==
- Engel, Pál (1996). Magyarország világi archontológiája, 1301–1457, I. [Secular Archontology of Hungary, 1301–1457, Volume I] (in Hungarian). História, MTA Történettudományi Intézete. ISBN 963-8312-44-0.
- Karácsonyi, János (1901). A magyar nemzetségek a XIV. század közepéig. III. kötet [The Hungarian genera until the middle of the 14th century, Vol. 3] (in Hungarian). Hungarian Academy of Sciences.
- Nekić, Antun (2017). Plemićki rod Tetenj od 13. do sredine 15. stoljeća [The Noble Kindred of Tetenj from the Thirteenth until the Middle of the Fifteenth Century] (in Croatian). Doctoral thesis, University of Zadar.
- Pálosfalvi, Tamás (2014). The Noble Elite in the County of Körös (Križevci), 1400–1526 (in Hungarian). MTA Bölcsészettudományi Kutatóközpont. ISBN 978-963-962-7840.
- Zsoldos, Attila (2011). Magyarország világi archontológiája, 1000–1301 [Secular Archontology of Hungary, 1000–1301] (in Hungarian). História, MTA Történettudományi Intézete. ISBN 978-963-9627-38-3.
