= Peter II Tétény =

Hungarian baron

Peter (II) Tétény

Ban of Slavonia
- Reign: 1279–1280; 1280; 1283
- Predecessor: Nicholas Gutkeled (1st term); Stephen Dorozsma (2nd term); Nicholas Kőszegi (3rd term)
- Successor: Stephen Dorozsma (1st term); Nicholas Kőszegi (2nd term); Ivan Kőszegi (3rd term)
- Died: 1283/1286
- Noble family: gens Tétény
- Spouse: N Siklósi
- Issue: Lawrence Pekri; Nicholas
- Father: Benedict

Peter (II) from the kindred Tétény (Hungarian: Tétény nembeli (II.) Péter; died between 1283 and 1286) was a Hungarian baron in the second half of the 13th century, who served as Ban of Slavonia three times (1279–1280, 1280 and 1283). He was a faithful confidant of King Ladislaus IV of Hungary in his fight against the oligarchic domains. Peter was forefather of the Pekri (or Pekry) noble family.

== Ancestry ==
Peter II was born into the gens (clan) Tétény as one of the sons of Benedict. He had two brothers Paul and Kemény. The Tétény clan was one of the most powerful clans in the first third of the 13th century, during the reign of Andrew II of Hungary. They possessed extensive landholdings in Slavonia. However, when Béla IV, who had long opposed father's political and economic reforms, ascended the Hungarian throne in 1235, they became disgraced and the overwhelming majority of their lands were confiscated. The Tétény clan disappeared from contemporary records for the upcoming four decades.

== Early career ==
Sometime around 1270, Peter entered the service of the powerful lord Joachim Gutkeled, who served as Ban of Slavonia from that year and was a central figure of the 1270s civil wars and feudal anarchy. Under Joachim's command, Peter took part in the Bohemian–Hungarian war in the spring of 1273, when King Ottokar II of Bohemia invaded Northern Hungary. Peter was present in the recapture of Győr and Szombathely in August, and also fought in the successful attack at Nagyszombat (today Trnava, Slovakia), where the town was recovered during the second phase of Ottokar's invasion in the autumn of 1273. During the siege, two of his teeth were knocked out by an arrow shot.

During the 1270s internal conflict under the minor Ladislaus' reign, Peter belonged to the Kőszegi–Gutkeled baronial group, which fought for the supreme power and political control over the royal council against the Csák–Aba faction. As a familiaris of Joachim Gutkeled, Peter participated in the clashes with the Babonići, who threatened Joachim's territorial domain in Slavonia. The Babonići rose up in rebellion in Slavonia in early 1277. Although the Hungarian royal army was able to suppress the rebellion by August 1277, where Peter also participated, his lord Joachim Gutkeled was killed in a battle in April 1277 and his oligarchic domain quickly disintegrated due to the partition agreements between the Kőszegis and the Babonići.

== Ban of Slavonia ==
Peter Tétény was installed Ban of Slavonia in the second half of 1279, succeeding Nicholas Gutkeled. According to Croatian historian Antun Nekić, Peter's political ascension took place because the Csáks, who dominated the royal council since 1277 decided to deprive the Gutkeleds from power for unknown reasons sometime after July 1279, despite their temporary alliance against the Kőszegis which was concluded after Joachim's death. It is possible that Peter left the allegiance of the Gutkeleds during that time and swore loyalty to the Csák kindred. In contrast, historian Attila Zsoldos considered Ladislaus IV, who was declared to be of age in May 1277, pursued an active and independent policy in the years 1277–1281, and Peter was able to rise to the narrow elite of the realm, because he faithfully supported the monarch against papal legate Philip, Bishop of Fermo over the Cuman question. Ladislaus appointed nobles who had been neglected until now to the court positions, including Peter Tétény, Lawrence Aba and Apor Péc.

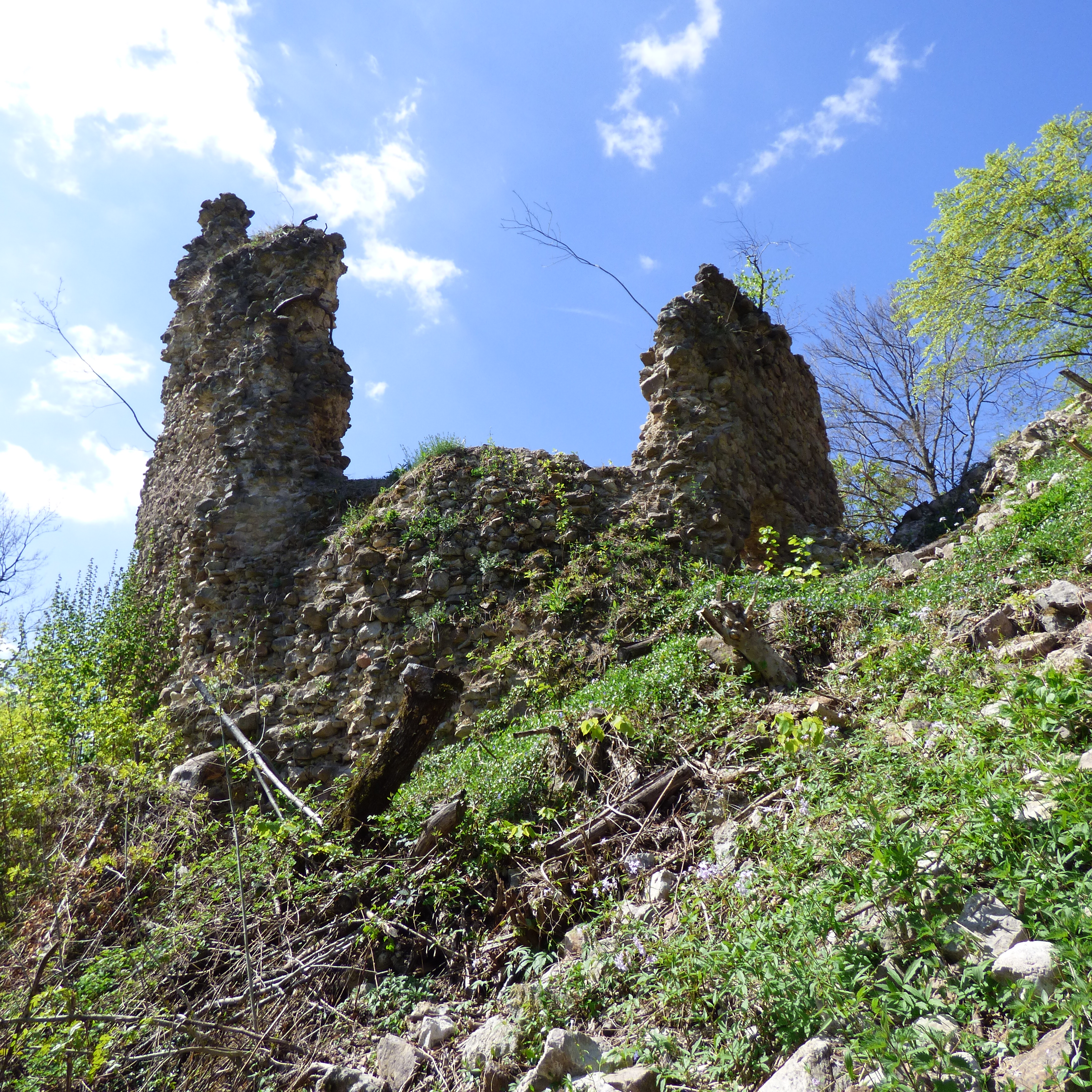
The ruins of Dobra Kuća, plausibly built by Peter (II) Tétény

Peter is first referred to as Ban of Slavonia on the last day of 1279. He presided over a general assembly (congregatio generalis) of the realm of Slavonia (regni Sclavonie) during that time, where he confirmed some of their previous privileges to brothers Pousa and Gecse Türje. Peter firmly protected the family interests, taking advantage of his position. When Conrad Győr filed a lawsuit against his brother Paul, because the latter looted his village in Baranya County, Palatine Matthew Csák ruled in favor of Conrad and ordered that Conrad should be brought into Paul's estate Sveti Đurađ (Scentgurg or Szentgyörgy), which was opposed by Paul's brothers, Peter and Kemény. Despite the verdict, the estate remained in the hands of the Tétény clan; as only a few years later Peter received an exemption for the taxation regarding the marturina and Szentgyörgy estate. Meanwhile, Ladislaus IV captured and imprisoned Philip of Fermo in late December 1279 or early January 1280. This escalation completely alienated the Hungarian lords from the monarch: as a result, they – under the leadership of Matthew Csák – decided to imprison the king. Sometime after January 1280, Ladislaus was arrested and transferred to the fort of Roland Borsa as a prisoner. Paul Tétény attempted to free Ladislaus with an armed force, but he failed. This proves that Peter and his kinship did not join the palace coup against the monarch. The royal council deprived Peter from his position around January 1280, and he was replaced by Stephen Dorozsma. With the mediation of Pope Nicholas III, both the legate and the king were set free within a month, in February 1280. It is plausible that Peter was that family member, who built the castle of Dobra Kuća (Hungarian: Dobrakucsa), laid near present-day Daruvar in Croatia, on the top of the Papuk mountain, which later became a royal property in 1335.

Ladislaus IV regained his complete range of motion by the summer of 1280. He reinstated his previously removed confidants in the royal council, including Peter Tétény, who was appointed Ban of Slavonia sometime between May and July 1280. Although Peter remained a confidant of the monarch, he was replaced as ban by Nicholas Kőszegi in October 1280 at the latest. For their loyalty during his imprisonment, Ladislaus donated the estates Aszuág (Ozyag; in the area between present-day Donji Miholjac és Sveti Đurađ in Croatia) and Gajul on the bank of river Ilova to Peter and his brothers in April 1281; both lands were formerly considered inherited estates of the Tétény clan, but were confiscated and attached to Baranya County during the ascension of Béla IV. Peter participated in the royal campaign against the rebellious Finta Aba in the summer of 1281. He was present at the siege of the fort of Szalánc (present-day Slanec, Slovakia).

Peter elevated to the position of Ban of Slavonia for the third time sometime between April 1281 (Nicholas Kőszegi's last appearance) and June 1283 (Peter's first mention in this capacity). In this capacity, Peter was involved in the harsh dispute between Dowager Queen Elizabeth the Cuman and Timothy, Bishop of Zagreb over the lordship of Garić (Garics or Podgaric). Timothy and his diocese were granted the castle of Garić and Gerzence (Garešnica) lordship by Ladislaus IV in March 1277 by eternal right. Despite that, the monarch donated the lordship with its accessories (the castle and the surrounding lands) to Peter for his loyal service in June 1283, saying that Peter formerly possessed the lordship, but it was wrongfully taken from him. Croatian historian Antun Nekić considered Peter belonged to the court of Elizabeth, then Duchess of Macsó and Bosnia, representing her interests in Garić and Gerzence against the Diocese of Zagreb and the Kőszegi family. By the 1290s, the Kőszegis practically extended their influence over the whole region. Simultaneously with his baronial dignity, Peter was also styled as ispán of Baranya County and the Gerzence lordship located in Križevci County in his own document in October 1283, when donated a portion in his inherited land Toplica to his familiaris Benedict, son of Job. The estate is identical with present-day Dimičkovina, a borough of Daruvar.

== Descendants ==
Peter Tétény died sometime between 1283 and 1286. Ivan Kőszegi is first referred to as Ban of Slavonia in November 1284, already. Peter married an unidentified noblewoman from the Siklós branch of the gens Kán. It is possible that his wife was a sister of Nicholas Siklósi, father of Julius and Peter.

Peter's sons, Lawrence and Nicholas appeared before the collegiate chapter of Buda (a place of authentication) on behalf of their uncle Kemény in 1286, and paid off the dower (i.e. a portion in Peker estate) of the unidentified widow of the late Abraham Tétény to the Dominican nunnery at Margaret Island, in accordance with her last will and testament. Instead of handing over the estate, they paid its equivalent of 40 marks. The noble Pekri family (also known as Pekry), which rose to prominence in the 16th century, during the Ottoman–Habsburg wars, descended from Lawrence.

== Sources ==
- Engel, Pál (1996). Magyarország világi archontológiája, 1301–1457, I. [Secular Archontology of Hungary, 1301–1457, Volume I] (in Hungarian). História, MTA Történettudományi Intézete. ISBN 963-8312-44-0.
- Karácsonyi, János (1901). A magyar nemzetségek a XIV. század közepéig. III. kötet [The Hungarian genera until the middle of the 14th century, Vol. 3] (in Hungarian). Hungarian Academy of Sciences.
- Markó, László (2006). A magyar állam főméltóságai Szent Istvántól napjainkig: Életrajzi Lexikon [Great Officers of State in Hungary from King Saint Stephen to Our Days: A Biographical Encyclopedia] (in Hungarian). Helikon Kiadó. ISBN 963-208-970-7.
- Nekić, Antun (2017). Plemićki rod Tetenj od 13. do sredine 15. stoljeća [The Noble Kindred of Tetenj from the Thirteenth until the Middle of the Fifteenth Century] (in Croatian). Doctoral thesis, University of Zadar.
- Zsoldos, Attila (1997). "Téténytől a Hód-tóig. Az 1279 és 1282 közötti évek politikatörténetének vázlata [From Tétény to Hód Lake: Outline of the Political History of the Years Between 1279 and 1282]". Történelmi Szemle (in Hungarian). 39 (1). Hungarian Academy of Sciences: 69–98. ISSN 0040-9634.
- Zsoldos, Attila (2011). Magyarország világi archontológiája, 1000–1301 [Secular Archontology of Hungary, 1000–1301] (in Hungarian). História, MTA Történettudományi Intézete. ISBN 978-963-9627-38-3.

Peter II Genus Tétény Born: ? Died: 1283/1286
Political offices
Preceded by Nicholas Gutkeled	Ban of Slavonia; 1279–1280	Succeeded by Stephen Dorozsma
Preceded by Stephen Dorozsma	Ban of Slavonia; 1280	Succeeded by Nicholas Kőszegi
Preceded by Nicholas Kőszegi	Ban of Slavonia; 1283	Succeeded by Ivan Kőszegi
