= Marcellus Tétény =

Hungarian lord (died after 1233)

Judge royal
- Reign: (1206–)1207; 1211–1212
- Predecessor: Smaragd (1st term); Nicholas (2nd term)
- Successor: Nicholas (1st term); Julius Kán (2nd term)
- Died: after 1233
- Noble family: gens Tétény
- Spouse: unknown
- Issue: none
- Father: Marcellus I (or Ambrose)

Marcellus (II) from the kindred Tétény (Hungarian: Tétény nembeli (II.) Marcell; died after 1233) was a Hungarian lord, who served as Judge royal twice during the reign of Andrew II of Hungary.

== Family ==
Marcellus II belonged to the gens Tétény as the eldest son of Marcellus I (or possibly Ambrose). It is plausible the clan possessed the initial ancient landholdings around Tétény in Central Hungary (present-day Budafok-Tétény, a southwest district of Budapest), including Sóskút and Tordas.

His brothers were Peter I, who functioned as Judge royal for the Queen from 1229 to 1230, and Abraham, who was ispán of Vas County (1233) and Sopron County (1235). Additionally, Fabian and Demetrius were also the brothers of him. Marcellus had no children. Among the five brothers, only Peter I had known descendants. Croatian historian Antun Nekić considered that Abraham was the son of Marcellus II and not his brother.

== Career ==
In contemporary records, Marcellus was first mentioned as ispán of Sopron County in 1206. After that he served as ispán of Csanád County between 1206 and 1207. He was replaced by Peter, son of Töre. In 1207, he appeared in charters as Judge royal at the first time; perhaps he already held that position since 1206. Following that he functioned as ispán of Bihar County in 1208. He was head of Sopron County again from 1208 till 1209. According to royal charters, he governed Bács County between 1209 and 1210., and Nyitra County for a short time in 1210. Marcellus' political influence is well reflected by the fact that his brothers (Peter, Fabian and Demetrius) were usually styled as "frater Marcelli" or "germanus Marcelli".

Marcellus participated in King Andrew's royal campaign against the Principality of Galicia in 1211, functioning as one of the commanders of the Hungarian army. He was appointed Judge royal for the second time in 1211 and held the office until the next year. Beside that he also functioned as ispán of Keve County between 1211 and 1212. For his faithful service, Marcellus was granted landholdings and estates across the Drava (including the extended lordship of Peker or Pukur in present-day Badljevina and the surrounding Osuvak), which he tried to expand by purchasing. His lands and estates were laying mostly south to the Drava River. Croatian historian Antun Nekić considered that Marcellus might have been part of the conspiracy against Queen Gertrude, who favored her own German courtiers against the Hungarian barons. Marcellus was deprived of his offices in 1212, thus he could join next year to the group of dissatisfied noblemen, who assassinated the queen in September 1213. Neither Marcellus nor his brothers held any important position until the late 1220s, and Béla's accession to the throne adversely affected them after 1235. Since Marcellus did not take part in the murder itself, he managed to avoid complete disgrace. Historian Attila Zsoldos incorrectly claimed that Marcellus held the office of Judge royal for the third time in 1214, in addition to his simultaneous service as ispán of Csanád County. In fact, both offices were held by Martin Hont-Pázmány in that year.

It is possible that Marcellus was present when Andrew II and Leszek the White, High Duke of Poland in Szepes (today Spiš, Slovakia) in the autumn of 1214, where they arranged the marriage between Coloman of Galicia and Salomea, and their alliance against regent Vladislav Kormilichich. Thereafter, Marcellus did not hold any offices in the royal court for unknown reasons (his involvement in Gertrude's murder is hypothetical). It is possible he took part in the Fifth Crusade in 1217–1218. Marcellus and Abraham were involved in a lawsuit over the land Toplica (present-day a borough of Daruvar in Croatia) near their ancient area Peker along the namesake river in 1232. They lost the case. Marcellus is referred to as the king's "former" chamberlain in 1233.

== Sources ==
- Font, Márta (2021). The Kings of the House of Árpád and the Rurikid Princes. Cooperation and conflict in medieval Hungary and Kievan Rus'. Arpadiana VIII., Research Centre for the Humanities. ISBN 978-963-416-278-0.
- Karácsonyi, János (1901). A magyar nemzetségek a XIV. század közepéig. III. kötet [The Hungarian genera until the middle of the 14th century, Vol. 3] (in Hungarian). Hungarian Academy of Sciences.
- Markó, László (2006). A magyar állam főméltóságai Szent Istvántól napjainkig: Életrajzi Lexikon [Great Officers of State in Hungary from King Saint Stephen to Our Days: A Biographical Encyclopedia] (in Hungarian). Helikon Kiadó. ISBN 963-208-970-7.
- Nekić, Antun (2017). Plemićki rod Tetenj od 13. do sredine 15. stoljeća [The Noble Kindred of Tetenj from the Thirteenth until the Middle of the Fifteenth Century] (in Croatian). Doctoral thesis, University of Zadar.
- Nekić, Antun (2023). "Short Remarks on the Murder of Queen Gertrude (1213)". Chronica. 22. Institute of History, University of Szeged: 103–112. ISSN 1588-2039.
- Zsoldos, Attila (2011). Magyarország világi archontológiája, 1000–1301 [Secular Archontology of Hungary, 1000–1301] (in Hungarian). História, MTA Történettudományi Intézete. ISBN 978-963-9627-38-3.

Marcellus II Genus Tétény Born: ? Died: after 1233
Political offices
Preceded by Smaragd	Judge royal (1206–)1207	Succeeded by Nicholas
Preceded by Nicholas	Judge royal 1211–1212	Succeeded by Julius Kán
