= Budmér (genus) =

Budmér was the name of a minor gens (Latin for "clan"; nemzetség in Hungarian) in the Kingdom of Hungary, which possessed lands in Southern Transdanubia, mostly Baranya County.

== History ==
The Budmér clan possibly originated from Slavonia. Their name comes from Slavic personal name Budimír. It may also come from Cuman Bütemer. According to historian György Györffy, they were of castle warrior origin, but historian Tamás Körmendi strongly doubts it because of the lack of royal castle lands in the region. By the last decades of the 13th century, when the genus first appeared in contemporary records, they possessed villages Nagybudmér and Kisbudmér north of the Villány Mountains. Both villages were named after the founder of the clan, Budmér or Budimír.

Two members of the family, Andrew (son of Peter) and Teha acted as arbiters in the lawsuit between James Győr and Kemény, son of Lawrence in 1285. Another member of the clan, Michael was a familiaris of Kemény. Andrew served as one of the noble judges (Hungarian: szolgabíró; lit. "servants' judge") of Baranya County in 1291 and 1295, alongside other local noblemen. This Andrew and his relative Bencentius (son of Mark) appeared as arbiters in 1296 and 1297, in a lawsuit between the Győr (Óvári) and Kán (Siklósi) clans.

Tamás Körmendi identified Nicholas the Sinister, who served as Master of the stewards from 1251 to 1256, as a member of the Budmér clan. He claimed this based on Nicholas' fragmentally preserved seal from 1255, which circumscription can be solved as "[- - - MA]GISTRI DE GENERE BVDMER", in addition to a 1285 charter by the cathedral chapter of Pécs, which referred to a certain Michael as a son of ispán Nicholas from the kindred Budmér (i.e. the above-mentioned Michael). Nicholas the Sinister also had a son named Michael. Nicholas' seal depicts two birds (pigeons or thrushes), which could be the symbol of the Budmér clan.

== Family tree ==
=== Fragmented data ===
- Peter
  - Andrew (fl. 1285–97), noble judge of Baranya County (1291, 1295)

Teha (fl. 1285)

- Mark
  - Bencentius (fl. 1296–97)

=== "Sinister" branch ===
- Nicholas I
  - Nicholas II ("the Sinister"; fl. 1241–1256), Master of the stewards (1251–1256)
    - Michael (or Nicholas III; fl. 1265–1285, died before 1287)
    - George (fl. 1265–1270) ∞ daughter of Conrad Győr
      - Stephanie (fl. 1302–1321) ∞ Nicholas Osl
    - Catherine ∞ Ladislaus Gyönki
    - a daughter (fl. 1287–1303) ∞ Kemény, son of Lawrence

== Sources ==
- Karácsonyi, János (1901). A magyar nemzetségek a XIV. század közepéig. I. kötet [The Hungarian genera until the middle of the 14th century, Vol. 1] (in Hungarian). Hungarian Academy of Sciences.
- Körmendi, Tamás (2009). "A magyarországi nemzetségi címerek kialakulásának kérdéséhez". Századok (in Hungarian). 143 (2). Magyar Történelmi Társulat: 391–426. ISSN 0039-8098.
- Zsoldos, Attila (2011). Magyarország világi archontológiája, 1000–1301 [Secular Archontology of Hungary, 1000–1301] (in Hungarian). História, MTA Történettudományi Intézete. ISBN 978-963-9627-38-3.
