= Lawrence II Aba =

Hungarian baron

Lawrence (II) Aba

Master of the treasury
- Reign: 1279 (–1280); 1280–1281 (1284–)1285
- Predecessor: Ugrin Csák (1st & 2nd term); Peter Aba (3rd term)
- Successor: Ugrin Csák (1st term); Peter Aba (2nd term); Ivan Kőszegi (3rd term)
- Died: after 1290
- Noble family: gens Aba
- Spouse: Cuman lady (?)
- Issue: Nicholas I Atyinai; John I Atyinai; James Atyinai; Peter I Atyinai
- Father: Lawrence I

Lawrence (II) from the kindred Aba (Hungarian: Aba nembeli (II.) Lőrinc; died after 1290) was a Hungarian nobleman in the 13th century, who served as Master of the treasury three times in the court of Ladislaus IV of Hungary. He was the forefather of the Atyinai noble family, which flourished until the mid-15th century.

== Family ==
Lawrence II was born into the Atyina–Gagy (or also Nyék) branch of the powerful and extended gens (clan) Aba. In genealogy, the branch was named after Atyina (present-day Voćin, Croatia), the acquisition and eponymous estate of Lawrence's sons. He was the only known son of his namesake father, who was a faithful partisan of Béla IV of Hungary. For his loyalty and military service, Lawrence I was granted large-scale landholdings in Sopron County.

== Career ==
He was also called as Lawrence of Nyék or Lawrence of Sopron by contemporary documents after his residence. He first appears in sources in 1279, when donated the estate of Limpach to the Cistercian Klostermarienberg Abbey (Borsmonostor, today part of Mannersdorf an der Rabnitz, Austria) for his late father's spiritual salvation, who was buried in the monastery. Lawrence II was considered a faithful confidant of Ladislaus IV and his mother, Dowager Queen Elizabeth the Cuman. According to a list of merits, issued by her in 1290, Lawrence usually "selflessly made his property available to the king" and negotiated in abroad at his own expense as an envoy of Ladislaus on several occasions. He was made Master of the treasury in December 1279, when Ladislaus IV imprisoned papal legate Philip of Fermo and reorganized the royal council in order to fill the dignities with his loyal partisans, including Peter Tétény and Apor Péc beside Lawrence. However, thereafter Ladislaus himself was also captured by some lords. In less than two months, both the legate and the king were set free. It is plausible that Lawrence held his dignity until the spring of 1280, when Ugrin Csák retook the position in accordance with the agreement and reconciliation between the king and the most powerful barons. When Ladislaus IV regained some space for maneuver, Lawrence again served as Master of the treasury from around July 1280 to April 1281, but he was ultimately replaced by his distant relative, Peter Aba from the more influential Széplak branch.

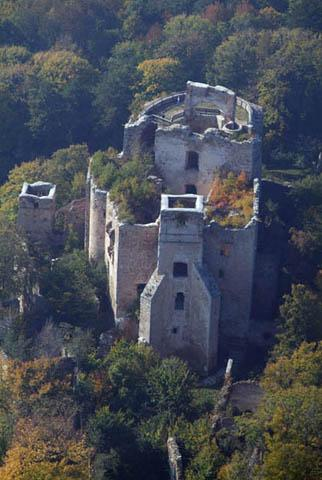
Aerial photography of Burgruine Landsee (Lánzsér), today in Austria

Since the early 1280s, the powerful Kőszegi family gradually extended their influence over Sopron County, including the Locsmánd region, where the majority of Lawrence's lands had laid. According to historian Gyula Kristó, Ivan Kőszegi brought whole Sopron County under his jurisdiction and annexed it to his emerging oligarchic province by 1285, when several local nobles were mentioned as his familiares. When Nicholas Kőszegi donated a land to the Klostermarienberg Abbey in 1285, Lawrence Aba, among others (for instance Simon Nagymartoni), appeared as a witness and was referred to as "cari nostri" ("our dear"), reflecting his political allegiance, as he was forced to enter the Kőszegis' service by then. The Kőszegis retook their positions over the royal council in 1284. During the course, Lawrence functioned as Master of the treasury for the third time, presumably between 1284 and 1285, until the Kőszegis' most recent rebellion against Ladislaus IV. Beside that, he also served as ispán of Sáros County in 1285.

Ivan Kőszegi's continuous looting raids in Austria and Styria resulted a large-scale war ("Güssing Feud"; German: Güssinger Fehde) throughout in 1289, when Albert I, Duke of Austria launched a massive royal campaign with his 15,000-size army against the Kőszegis and their familiares. The Austrians captured at least 30 fortresses and settlements along the western borders, including Aba Lawrence's three castles, Lánzsér, Nyék and Locsmánd (present-day Landsee, Neckenmarkt and Lutzmannsburg in Austria, respectively), because Lawrence and his banderium refused to join the Austrian army to defeat the Kőszegi family. Duke Albert's mercenaries completely burnt and devastated the fort of Nyék, Lawrence's residence, while its inhabitants were imprisoned and sent to Austria in the spring of 1289. Nyék Castle was never re-built. For his loyalty, Queen Elizabeth, with the consent of her son, Ladislaus IV, donated the abbey of Szentmárton in Virovitica County to him in 1290. In her document, the queen referred to Lawrence as her "dear relative" ("cognatus carissimus") and she justified the donation not only on merit but also on kinship ("ratio proximitatis"). Genealogist Mór Wertner argued Lawrence married one of the Cuman relatives of Queen Elizabeth. Ladislaus IV was assassinated some months later. Lawrence Aba swore loyalty to Andrew III of Hungary, and was granted lands in Križevci County from the new Hungarian monarch. These acquisitions in Slavonia became the basis of his descendants' direction of expansion, in addition that his family successfully recovered Lánzsér after Andrew's royal campaign against Austria. Lawrence Aba died sometime after 1290.

From his marriage to an unidentified (Cuman?) lady, Lawrence II had four sons, Nicholas I, John I, James and Peter I. During the Interregnum, they supported the claim of Charles I of Hungary. Nicholas I married one of the daughters of the once powerful baron Egidius Monoszló. Through this wedding, the brothers acquired the lordships of Darnóc (today Slatinski Drenovac in Croatia) and Atyina, and – following violent struggles with the Kőszegis – became ancestors of the Atyinai family (1317), which flourished until the 1430s.

== Sources ==
- Kristó, Gyula (1969). "A locsmándi várispánság és felbomlása [The Royal Castle Ispánate of Locsmánd and its Dissolution]". Soproni Szemle (in Hungarian). 23 (2). Soproni Városszépítő Egyesület: 131–144. ISSN 0133-0748.
- Markó, László (2006). A magyar állam főméltóságai Szent Istvántól napjainkig: Életrajzi Lexikon [Great Officers of State in Hungary from King Saint Stephen to Our Days: A Biographical Encyclopedia] (in Hungarian). Helikon Kiadó. ISBN 963-547-085-1.
- Wertner, Mór (1892). Az Árpádok családi története [Family History of the Árpáds] (in Hungarian). Szabó Ferencz N.-eleméri plébános & Pleitz Fer. Pál Könyvnyomdája.
- Zsoldos, Attila (1997). "Téténytől a Hód-tóig. Az 1279 és 1282 közötti évek politikatörténetének vázlata [From Tétény to Hód Lake: Outline of the Political History of the Years Between 1279 and 1282]". Történelmi Szemle (in Hungarian). 39 (1). Hungarian Academy of Sciences: 69–98. ISSN 0040-9634.
- Zsoldos, Attila (2011). Magyarország világi archontológiája, 1000–1301 [Secular Archontology of Hungary, 1000–1301] (in Hungarian). História, MTA Történettudományi Intézete. ISBN 978-963-9627-38-3.

Lawrence II Genus Aba Born: ? Died: after 1290
Political offices
Preceded by Ugrin Csák	Master of the treasury 1279(–1280)	Succeeded by Ugrin Csák
Preceded by Ugrin Csák	Master of the treasury 1280–1281	Succeeded by Peter Aba
Preceded by Peter Aba	Master of the treasury (1284–)1285	Succeeded by Ivan Kőszegi
