= Demetrius Tétény =

Hungarian noble

Ispán of Varaždin
- Reign: 1234
- Predecessor: Atyusz III Atyusz
- Successor: Michael Hahót
- Died: after 1234
- Noble family: gens Tétény
- Father: Marcellus I (or Ambrose)

Demetrius from the kindred Tétény (Hungarian: Tétény nembeli Demeter; died after 1234) was a Hungarian noble in the first half of the 13th century, who served as ispán of Varaždin County in 1234, during the reign of Andrew II of Hungary.

== Life ==
Demetrius was born into the gens (clan) Tétény as the son of Marcellus I (or Ambrose). His four brothers were Marcellus II, Peter I – both of them were influential barons in the court of Andrew II –, Fabian and Abraham.

Demetrius acted as co-judge beside the king in 1232, on the occasion of a lawsuit. He was mentioned among the barons of the kingdom as "friar Marceli". Demetrius served as ispán of Varaždin County in 1234, but it is possible he already held the office in 1232.

== Sources ==
- Karácsonyi, János (1901). A magyar nemzetségek a XIV. század közepéig. III. kötet [The Hungarian genera until the middle of the 14th century, Vol. 3] (in Hungarian). Hungarian Academy of Sciences.
- Nekić, Antun (2017). Plemićki rod Tetenj od 13. do sredine 15. stoljeća [The Noble Kindred of Tetenj from the Thirteenth until the Middle of the Fifteenth Century] (in Croatian). Doctoral thesis, University of Zadar.
- Zsoldos, Attila (2011). Magyarország világi archontológiája, 1000–1301 [Secular Archontology of Hungary, 1000–1301] (in Hungarian). História, MTA Történettudományi Intézete. ISBN 978-963-9627-38-3.

Demetrius Genus Tétény Born: ? Died: after 1234
Political offices
| Preceded by (?) Atyusz Atyusz | Ispán of Varaždin; 1234 | Succeeded by (?) Michael Hahót |
