= Michael Hahót =

Hungarian noble

Michael (I) Hahót

Ispán of Varaždin
- Reign: 1244
- Predecessor: Demetrius Tétény
- Successor: Ekch
- Died: after 1256
- Noble family: gens Hahót
- Spouses: 1, unidentified 2, unidentified (div. 1233)
- Issue: (1) Michael II (1) a daughter (?) John
- Father: Hahold II
- Mother: first wife of his father

Michael (I) from the kindred Hahót (Hungarian: Hahót nembeli (I.) Mihály; fl. 1222–56) was a Hungarian noble, who served as ispán of Varaždin County in 1244.

== Family ==
Michael I was born into the Hahold branch of the gens Hahót as the son of Hahold II (fl. 1192) and his unidentified first wife. He had a brother, Hahold III, who was ispán of Vas County from 1237 to 1239. Their father married for the second time, which marriage produced further three sons: Ákos, Nicholas I and Denis I. Michael I had two children from his first unidentified wife: Michael II and an unidentified daughter, who married Györk Atyusz, the son of influential baron Atyusz III Atyusz. It is presumable that John, the Archbishop of Split from 1266 to 1294, who entered Franciscans prior to that, was also his son.

Sometime after the death of his first wife, Michael married the widow of Michael Héder. She had three sons from her first marriage, Hencse, Lawrence and Virunt. After a "few years of living together", Michael Hahót unilaterally divorced and banished his wife from his manor. In response, his stepsons filed a lawsuit against him, who defended himself before the court that, during wedding, he was unaware of the fact that his wife was a goddaughter ("spiritualis filia") of his late father, Hahold II. After hearing witnesses from both families, Bartholomew, Bishop of Veszprém officially broke the marriage and obliged Michael to pay 140 marks to his ex-wife and her sons in 1233.

== Career ==
He was first mentioned by contemporary records in 1222, when bought the land of Szemenye (today in Muraszemenye) from the Chapter of Veszprém. Alongside his cousin, Ban Buzád Hahót, he appeared as a witness in the so-called Kehida Diploma of 1232, where the royal servants of Zala County urged King Andrew II of Hungary to recognise their verdict as compulsory, because Atyusz, the father of Michael's future son-in-law, refused to give back the land of Wezmech to the Diocese of Veszprém. Later, the royal servants were able to enforce the verdict as Bartholomew, Bishop of Veszprém sold Wezmech to Michael Hahót in 1239. In a royal charter of 1234, the sons of Ban Buzád agreed to their second-degree uncle, Michael to own the kindred's possession of Szemenye sole and entire.

From 1239 to 1240 (or 1241), he served as Master of the stewards for Queen Maria Laskarina, the consort of King Béla IV of Hungary. In this capacity, he took care of the minor children – Catherine, Elizabeth, Constance, Yolanda and Stephen – of the royal family until the king's court fled to Dalmatia following the Mongol invasion and the disastrous Battle of Mohi in April 1241. After that he was entrusted to maintain order in the area of Varaždin and Ptuj after the withdrawal of the Mongols in 1242. Thus it is possible he already held the Varaždin (Hungarian: Varasd) ispánate (which then belonged to the Hungarian realm and was not part of the province of Slavonia) since that year. In this context, he was first mentioned by a source in July 1244. He held the dignity amid political sensitive situation. Béla, who was grateful to Trogir, which provided shelter to the royal family during the Mongol invasion, granted it lands near Split, causing a lasting conflict between the two Dalmatian towns. The burghers of Trogir resorted to the king for help. Michael participated in Béla's campaign in Dalmatia in 1244, and was a member of that Hungarian army, led by Slavonian Ban Denis Türje, which supported Trogir in the clashes against Split.

In 1248, he founded a Franciscan monastery in Szemenye, dedicated to Mary the Virgin. He convened a congregatio to offer and determine the yearly amount of alms for the monks, thus Michael still owned the land itself. Later the Bánfi de Alsólendva family, descendants of the Hahót kindred through his brother Hahold III, became patron of the monastery. Michael Hahót died after 1256.

== Sources ==
- Cselenkó, Borbála (2006). Szerzetesrendek az Árpád-kori Zala megyében [Monasteries in Zala County of the Era of the Árpáds] (in Hungarian). Zalai Kismonográfiák 9., Zala Megyei Múzeumok Igazgatósága. ISBN 963-7205-43-8.
- Karácsonyi, János (1901). A magyar nemzetségek a XIV. század közepéig. II. kötet [The Hungarian genera until the middle of the 14th century, Vol. 2] (in Hungarian). Hungarian Academy of Sciences.
- Zsoldos, Attila (1997). "»Eléggé nemes férfiak...« A kehidai oklevél társadalomtörténeti vonatkozásairól". In Káli, Csaba (ed.). Zalai történeti tanulmányok [Essays on History of Zala] (in Hungarian). Zala County Archives. pp. 7–19. ISBN 963-7226-26-5.
- Zsoldos, Attila (2011). Magyarország világi archontológiája, 1000–1301 [Secular Archontology of Hungary, 1000–1301] (in Hungarian). História, MTA Történettudományi Intézete. ISBN 978-963-9627-38-3.

Michael I Genus Hahót Born: ? Died: after 1256
Political offices
Preceded by Demetrius Tétény	Ispán of Varaždin; 1244	Succeeded by Ekch
