= Peter I Tétény =

Hungarian noble

Peter (I) Tétény

Count of the Queen's Court
- Reign: 1229–1230
- Predecessor: Atyusz Atyusz
- Successor: Julius Kán
- Died: after 1233
- Noble family: gens Tétény
- Issue: Benedict
- Father: Marcellus I (or Ambrose)

Peter (I) from the kindred Tétény (Hungarian: Tétény nembeli (I.) Péter; died after 1233) was a Hungarian noble in the first half of the 13th century, who administered counties during the reign of Andrew II of Hungary.

== Family ==
Peter (I) was born into the gens (clan) Tétény as the son of Marcellus I (or Ambrose). His brothers were Marcellus II, an influential baron in the court of Andrew II, Fabian, Demetrius and Abraham. Of the five brothers, only Peter had descendants. Through his only known son Benedict, he was forefather of the noble Pekri family (also known as Pekry), which rose to prominence in the 16th century, during the Ottoman–Habsburg wars.

== Career ==
Along with his brothers, Peter was a confidant of King Andrew II. In contemporary documents, he was usually styled as "frater Marcelli" or "germanus Marcelli", which reflects his brother Marcellus' influence in the royal court during that time. Peter is first referred to as ispán of Temes County in 1221. Whether Peter is identical with those namesake office-holders, who held ispánates in various parts of the kingdom in the 1220s, is unknown. Prior to 1228, Peter was involved in a lawsuit with the Vajk kindred over a possession called Keresztúr, which laid between Peker (or Pukur) and Toplica (present-day a borough of Daruvar in Croatia). During the trial, certain Arnold, son of Peterd and Leucus, son of Deschen were mentioned as Peter's relatives (possibly by his marriage). The court ruled against Peter in 1228.

Peter served as count (head) of the court of Queen Yolanda of Courtenay from 1229 to 1230. Beside that, he also administered Abaúj County (or Újvár) in 1230. According to a non-authentic charter, he held the latter position in 1232 too. He functioned as ispán of Nyitra County in 1233. In this capacity, he was among those barons of the realm, who swore to the Oath of Bereg – the agreement of Andrew II and the Holy See – in September 1233. Still in 1233, Peter was replaced as ispán by Sebes Hont-Pázmány. It is possible that neither Marcellus nor Peter outlived Andrew's death, which occurred in 1235.

== Sources ==
- Karácsonyi, János (1901). A magyar nemzetségek a XIV. század közepéig. III. kötet [The Hungarian genera until the middle of the 14th century, Vol. 3] (in Hungarian). Hungarian Academy of Sciences.
- Nekić, Antun (2017). Plemićki rod Tetenj od 13. do sredine 15. stoljeća [The Noble Kindred of Tetenj from the Thirteenth until the Middle of the Fifteenth Century] (in Croatian). Doctoral thesis, University of Zadar.
- Zsoldos, Attila (2011). Magyarország világi archontológiája, 1000–1301 [Secular Archontology of Hungary, 1000–1301] (in Hungarian). História, MTA Történettudományi Intézete. ISBN 978-963-9627-38-3.

Peter I Genus Tétény Born: ? Died: after 1233
Political offices
Preceded by Atyusz Atyusz	Count of the Queen's Court; 1229–1230	Succeeded by Julius Kán
