= Abraham Tétény =

13th-century Hungarian noble

Ispán of Sopron
- Reign: 1235
- Predecessor: File Szeretvai
- Successor: Osl Osl
- Died: after 1239
- Noble family: gens Tétény
- Spouse: unknown
- Issue: none
- Father: Marcellus I (or Ambrose)

Abraham from the kindred Tétény (Hungarian: Tétény nembeli Ábrahám; died after 1239) was a Hungarian noble in the first half of the 13th century, who administered counties during the reign of Andrew II of Hungary.

== Career ==
Abraham was born into the gens (clan) Tétény as the third son of Marcellus I (or Ambrose). His elder brothers were Marcellus II and Peter I, both of them were influential barons in the court of Andrew II. Additionally, Fabian and Demetrius were also the brothers of him. Croatian historian Antun Nekić considered that Abraham was the son of Marcellus II and not his brother.

The brothers possessed lands in Slavonia. Marcellus and Abraham were involved in a lawsuit over the land Toplica (present-day a borough of Daruvar in Croatia) near their ancient area Peker or Pukur (present-day Badljevina) along the namesake river in 1232. They lost the case. Abraham was referred to as ispán of Vas County in 1233. He administered Sopron County in 1235, but lost the office when Béla IV of Hungary ascended the Hungarian throne in that year.

The Tétény kindred became disgraced thereafter and Béla IV confiscated their "unlawful inheritances", including Abraham's possessions. Abraham handed over his all purchased estates beyond the river Drava – Daróc (present-day Vardarac, Croatia), Ködmen, Rücs (Ručevo) and Donát in Valkó County – to Coloman, the Duke of Slavonia and Béla's brother, thus he was able to retain his portion in the inherited lordship of Peker. His right of ownership over the estate was confirmed by Coloman in 1237. Two years later, Coloman donated Abraham's former lands to his confidant File Miskolc. Abraham undertook a guarantee for the quality of the lands. Abraham died without issue sometime after 1239. His unidentified widow, bequeathed her dower, the estate Peker to the Dominican nunnery at Margaret Island, which she probably entered. This was paid by Peter's descendants in amount of 40 marks in 1286 after a lengthy dispute.

== Sources ==
- Karácsonyi, János (1901). A magyar nemzetségek a XIV. század közepéig. III. kötet [The Hungarian genera until the middle of the 14th century, Vol. 3] (in Hungarian). Hungarian Academy of Sciences.
- Nekić, Antun (2017). Plemićki rod Tetenj od 13. do sredine 15. stoljeća [The Noble Kindred of Tetenj from the Thirteenth until the Middle of the Fifteenth Century] (in Croatian). Doctoral thesis, University of Zadar.
- Zsoldos, Attila (2011). Magyarország világi archontológiája, 1000–1301 [Secular Archontology of Hungary, 1000–1301] (in Hungarian). História, MTA Történettudományi Intézete. ISBN 978-963-9627-38-3.

Abraham Genus Tétény Born: ? Died: after 1239
Political offices
| Preceded by Buzád Hahót | Ispán of Vas; 1233 | Succeeded by Martin Ják |
| Preceded by File Szeretvai | Ispán of Sopron; 1235 | Succeeded by Osl Osl |
