= Nicholas Budmér =

Hungarian noble

Nicholas (II) Budmér
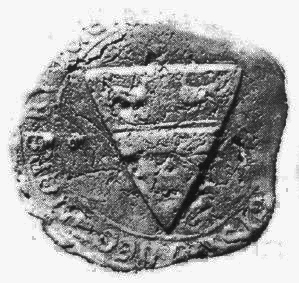
- Seal of Nicholas Budmér (1255)

Master of the stewards
- Reign: 1251–1256
- Predecessor: Maurice Pok
- Successor: Mojs
- Died: between 1256 and 1265
- Noble family: gens Budmér
- Issue: Michael; George; Catherine a daughter
- Father: Nicholas I

Nicholas (II) from the kindred Budmér, also known as Nicholas the Sinister (Hungarian: Budmér nembeli "Balog" Miklós; died after 1256) was a Hungarian noble in the 13th century, who served as Master of the stewards from 1251 to 1256.

== Family ==
Nicholas was born into a noble family, which possessed lands in the area between Harsány and Szársomlyó Hill in Baranya County. His father was Nicholas (I), whose parentage is unknown. Contemporary records, even his own charter in 1255, frequently referred to him as Nicholas "the Sinister" or "the Left-handed" (Hungarian: Balog), but he definitely did not belong to the powerful clan Balog, which owned lands in northern Hungary. Historian Tamás Körmendi identified Nicholas as a member of the gens (clan) Budmér, a relatively insignificant kindred from Baranya County. Körmendi claimed this based on Nicholas' fragmentally preserved seal from 1255, which circumscription can be solved as "[- - - MA]GISTRI DE GENERE BVDMER", in addition to a 1285 charter by the cathedral chapter of Pécs, which referred to a certain Michael as a son of ispán Nicholas from the kindred Budmér. Nicholas' seal depicts two birds (pigeons or thrushes).

Nicholas had two sons and two daughters. The eldest son Michael (or Nicholas III) was a courtier of Queen Maria Laskarina in 1267. He inherited his estates but died without descendants around 1287. The second son George married an unidentified daughter of Conrad Győr, also a landowner in Baranya County. They had a daughter Stephanie. Catherine was the wife of Ladislaus Gyönki, a nobleman from Tolna County. Their descendants owned Gyönk until the mid-15th century. Nicholas' another unidentified daughter married Kemény, the son of Palatine Lawrence. They were ancestors of the Cseményi family, which flourished until the early 15th century. As both Michael and George died without male heirs, the majority of the wealth of Nicholas' family, particularly the lordship of Harsány were inherited by Kemény in 1287, who was one of the richest noblemen in Baranya County by that time.

== Career ==
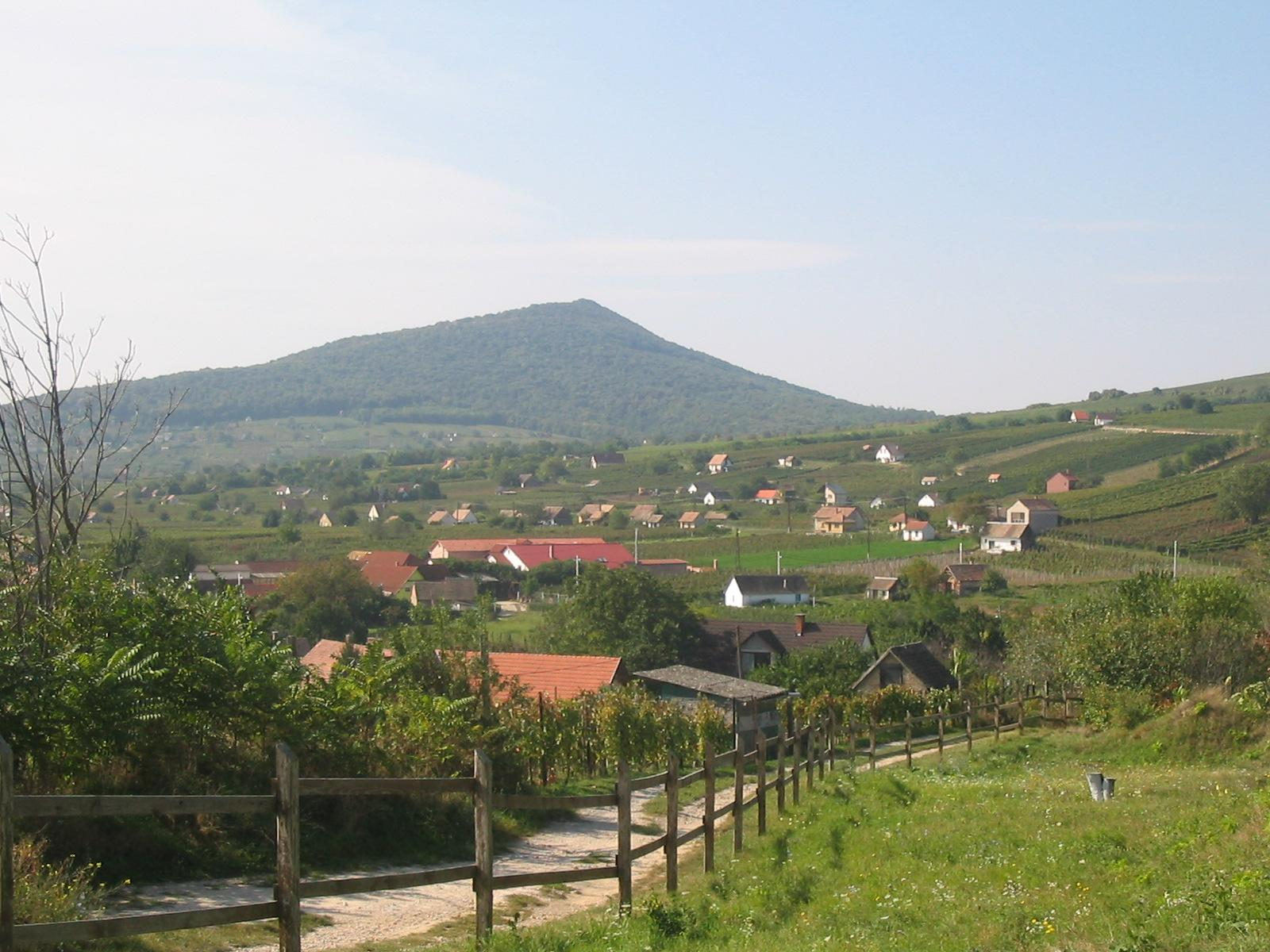
Szársomlyó Hill near Nagyharsány, where Nicholas Budmér built his castle in the 1250s

During the First Mongol invasion of Hungary, Nicholas participated in the disastrous Battle of Mohi on 11 April 1241, from where fled together with king Béla IV of Hungary to the Dalmatian coast. According to the king's donation letter (1249), Nicholas was sent to diplomatic missions in several unspecified cases in the following years. Belonging to the household of the child prince and heir Duke Stephen, Nicholas served as ispán of Dubica County from 1244 to 1249, which had laid in Lower Slavonia. In this capacity, he fought against the heretics in Bosnia between 1244 and 1246. Nicholas was also present at the Battle of the Leitha River on 15 June 1246, where the Hungarians were defeated but their enemy, Frederick the Quarrelsome was killed. In 1249, Nicholas was styled as treasurer in the ducal court of Stephen.

For his loyal service, Nicholas was granted the royal lands around Harsány by Béla IV in 1249, to increase the area of his own estates. In addition, Nicholas was also permitted to build a stone castle on top of the Szársomlyó Hill in order to prevent a possible subsequent Mongol invasion. Nicholas erected the fort, called Harsány Castle or Szársomlyó Castle in the 1250s. Around the same time, Nicholas was also granted the village Danóc and the right of patronage over the monastery of Gét in Baranya County by King Béla, who confiscated them from Gug and his sons, ancestors of the prestigious Újlaki family. Nicholas was made Master of the stewards in the royal court sometime before November 1251. He held the position at least until February 1256. He was replaced by Mojs in that year. From 1254 to 1255, Nicholas was mandated to supervise and confiscate the former royal land donations to the udvornici in Western Hungary – Somogy, Zala, Vas and Veszprém counties.

== Legacy ==
Nicholas died sometime between 1256 and 1265. In the latter year, his sons Michael (Nicholas) and George possessed the right of patronage over Gét, indicating his death by that time. According to the document, the elderly Béla IV took back the right and the village Danóc from the brothers and recovered them to the original owners Gug and his sons. The monarch compensated Michael and George with the estates Szederjes (in the territory of present-day Sudaraž) and Mamád. After the death of Michael (and thus the extinction of the "Sinister branch"), the fort of Szársomlyó and the surrounding lordship of Harsány became the property of Nicholas' son-in-law Kemény. His family still owned the castle in the early 14th century, but soon the advancing Kőszegi family seized it along with several other castles in the region of Southern Transdanubia. Following their fall, the fort became a royal castle, then a property of the Kórógyis.

== Sources ==
- Engel, Pál (1996). Magyarország világi archontológiája, 1301–1457, I. [Secular Archontology of Hungary, 1301–1457, Volume I] (in Hungarian). História, MTA Történettudományi Intézete. ISBN 963-8312-44-0.
- Kis, Péter (2010). A királyi szolgálónépi szervezet a 13–14. században [The Organization of Royal Servants in the 13–14th Centuries]. Szeged: Szegedi Középkortörténeti Könyvtár. ISBN 978-963-306-080-3.
- Körmendi, Tamás (2009). "A magyarországi nemzetségi címerek kialakulásának kérdéséhez". Századok (in Hungarian). 143 (2). Magyar Történelmi Társulat: 391–426. ISSN 0039-8098.
- Wertner, Mór (1897). "Sinister (Balog) Miklós és utódai [Nicholas the Sinister and his Descendants]". Turul (in Hungarian). 15 (3): 136–137. ISSN 1216-7258.
- Zsoldos, Attila (2007). Családi ügy: IV. Béla és István ifjabb király viszálya az 1260-as években [A family affair: The Conflict between Béla IV and Junior King Stephen in the 1260s] (in Hungarian). História, MTA Történettudományi Intézete. ISBN 978-963-9627-15-4.
- Zsoldos, Attila (2011). Magyarország világi archontológiája, 1000–1301 [Secular Archontology of Hungary, 1000–1301] (in Hungarian). História, MTA Történettudományi Intézete. ISBN 978-963-9627-38-3.

Nicholas II Genus Budmér Born: ? Died: after 1256
Political offices
Preceded by Maurice Pok	Master of the stewards 1251–1256	Succeeded by Mojs
