= Kemény, son of Lawrence =

Hungarian lord

Master of the cupbearers
- Reign: 1289
- Predecessor: Stephen Borsa
- Successor: James Győr
- Died: between 1299 and 1302
- Noble family: Matucsinai kinship
- Spouse: N Budmér
- Issue: Lawrence II; Conrad Cseményi two daughters
- Father: Lawrence I

Kemény, son of Lawrence (Hungarian: Lőrinc fia Kemény; died between 1299 and 1302) was a Hungarian lord in the late 13th century, who served as Master of the cupbearers in 1289. During the era of feudal anarchy, he was one of the most powerful landowners in Southern Transdanubia, especially Baranya County. The Cseményi noble family descended from him.

== Family ==
Kemény (also Kemen, Kemyn or Kemynus) was born into a noble family, which possessed lands in southern Transdanubia, especially Baranya County. His father was Lawrence (I), an illustrious military general and baron during the reign of Béla IV of Hungary, who held various government positions during his career. Kemény had a brother Nicholas ("Bakó"). Kemény married an unidentified daughter of Nicholas Budmér, the Master of the stewards from 1251 to 1256. They had two sons, Lawrence (II) and Conrad, both still were minors in 1302. Through the latter, Kemény and his wife were ancestors of the Cseményi family, which became extinct in the early 15th century. They also had two unidentified daughters, still unmarried in 1303.

== Career ==
Lawrence died sometime between 1274 and 1280. Both Kemény and Nicholas embroiled in conflict with the Óvári family from the gens (clan) Győr, which also possessed large portions in Baranya County. Kemény's troops burned and perished three villages of James Győr – Gyula, Great and Little Kéménd –, murdered his six Italian (or Walloon) serfs and captured and robbed James himself. He redeemed his freedom for 100 marks. In October 1285, the Pécs Chapter declared Kemény's act as unlawful and unfounded and ordered to pay damages. The chapter also sentenced Kemény to 73-day imprisonment beginning on 12 May 1286 to a house owned by the Dominican friars of Pécs. According to the verdict, Kemény had to apologize barefoot, with his belt off, begging to James after his release, but it is likely that the verdict was never implemented. Kemény also had to pay 200 marks throughout the year 1287.

Kemény was a faithful confidant of King Ladislaus IV of Hungary. According to the monarch, Kemény had served the royal court with his participation in various military expeditions, but the king does not go into detail about these. When his brother-in-law Michael Budmér died without male descendants, which also resulted the extinction of his kindred, his estates escheated to the Crown. In the summer of 1287, Ladislaus IV donated these landholdings – the castle of Harsány (or Szársomlyó) with its accessories – to Kemény. Among the surrounding villages, of which the lordship of Harsány was composed, were Ug, Permány, Tótvölgy, Perecske, Boja, Hídvég and the St. Michael monastery. Kemény was appointed Master of the cupbearers by June 1289. Beside that, he also served as ispán of Baranya County at least from June 1289 to October 1291. He is first mentioned in these capacities, when Ladislaus IV renewed the aforementioned land donation to Kemény in June 1289. The monarch referred to his faithful service since Kemény's "adolescence" after the death of Stephen V of Hungary and his ascension to the Hungarian throne (1272), and also emphasized that Kemény never rebelled against the king despite the turbulent political conditions (the era of feudal anarchy). Upon the request of his mother Elizabeth the Cuman and wife Isabella of Sicily, Ladislaus expanded the range of donated villages for Kemény. Several settlements – Harsány, Babócsa, Világosberek, Keresztes, Bánfalva, Belus, Urosfalva, Töttös, Hetény, Szederjes, Rékas, Barkfalva, Letnek, Majs, Fejértó és Csősztelek, together with fishponds along the river Drava – were attached to the lordship of Harsány, accordingly.

Following the assassination of Ladislaus IV, Kemény swore loyalty to the new monarch Andrew III of Hungary in 1290. When the pretender entered Hungary, he hosted him on his estate and was among those noblemen, who escorted him to Székesfehérvár, where he was crowned. In early 1291, Kemény fought in that auxiliary troops at his own expense, which was sent to Poland in order to assist Władysław the Elbow-high, Duke of Kraków and Sandomierz in his unification war against Wenceslaus II of Bohemia. Kemény also participated in the royal campaign against the Duchy of Austria in the summer of 1291, still holding the title of ispán of Baranya County. Because of his military service, Andrew III confirmed the aforementioned donation letters of Ladislaus IV in August 1291 and October 1291, regarding Szársomlyó Castle and Harsány lordship.

In the remaining years, his acts of domination and violent actions were preserved in Baranya County. When his brother Nicholas unlawfully seized the estate Kopács (present-day Kopačevo, Croatia) from Conrad Győr, Andrew III enforced an agreement between Nicholas and Conrad, under which he ordered Nicholas to return the village to its original owner. However, Nicholas even in 1300 usurped Kopács, because Kemény, who was responsible for enforcing the provision as the ispán of Baranya County, successfully sabotaged the decision, in accordance with a royal instruction to his successor John Csák. According to a charter from November 1294, Kemény also embroiled in conflict with Julius Siklósi, then incumbent ispán, whose landholdings he has ravaged. Their conflict was settled in an arbitral tribunal. Kemény was again styled as ispán of Baranya County from March 1296 to June 1299. In this capacity, he and the Kórógyis plundered and seized several lands of Conrad Győr in 1296, including Kéménd, Gyula, Olasz and Palkonya. In retaliation for the official complaint of Conrad Győr, Kemény and Philip Kórógyi destroyed his several additional landholdings in the area, for instance Gréc and Csér. According to the investigation, Kemény's castellans, Koppány of Szársomlyó and Ladislaus, son of Welk (Újvár ["New Castle"], later Matucsina) also participated in the raid, looting and transferring the treasures to Harsány, where Kemény's fortified manor located. During the trial, Kemény's several lands were confiscated – Permány, Ug, Tótvölgy and Kövesd – as a compensation to Conrad Győr, in accordance with vice-judge royal Stephen's letter in September 1299, while Kemény and his accomplices were summoned to the king's court. Kemény died sometime before July 1302, when his brother Nicholas and his sons Lawrence and Conrad were registered as owners of Csama and Harsány, respectively. Following a lost litigation against their relative, Stephanie Budmér (also Conrad Győr's granddaughter), Kemény's impoverished widow mortgaged, then sold Fejértó around October 1303 to their familiaris Ladislaus Hencsei, in order to raise her orphaned two sons and to get marry their two daughters.

== Sources ==
- Béli, Gábor (2013). "Börtönviselés perbeli egyezség alapján a XIII. században [Imprisonment on the Basis of a Court Settlement in the 13th Century]". In Máthé, Gábor; Révész, T. Mihály; Gosztonyi, Gergely (eds.). Jogtörténeti Parerga. Ünnepi tanulmányok Mezey Barna 60. születésnapja tiszteletére (in Hungarian). ELTE Eötvös Kiadó. pp. 66–72. ISBN 978-963-312-166-5.
- Wertner, Mór (1892). "Kemény fia Lőrincz nádor és utódai [Palatine Lawrence, son of Kemény and his Descendants]". Századok (in Hungarian). 26 (1). Magyar Történelmi Társulat: 41–55. ISSN 0039-8098.
- Zsoldos, Attila (2011). Magyarország világi archontológiája, 1000–1301 [Secular Archontology of Hungary, 1000–1301] (in Hungarian). História, MTA Történettudományi Intézete. ISBN 978-963-9627-38-3.

Political offices
Preceded by Stephen Borsa	Master of the cupbearers 1289	Succeeded by James Győr
