= Dobra Kuća =

Fortress in Croatia

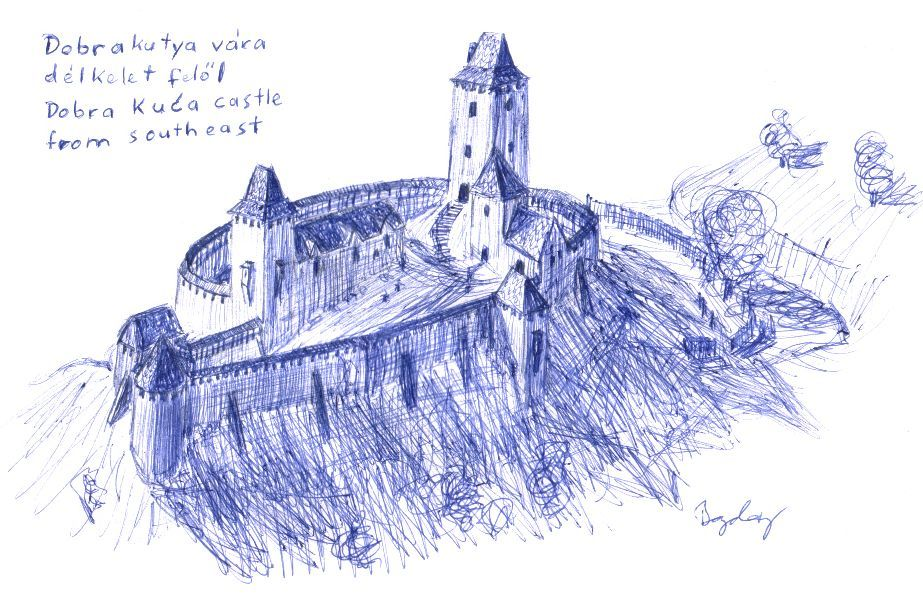
Imagined sight of castle Dobra Kuća

Medieval castle Dobra Kuća (meaning "Good House", also Hungarian: Dobrakutya) was an important fortification of the region in the Middle Ages. It is often mentioned in Croatian medieval sources. It is situated near city of Daruvar, Croatia. Dobra Kuća, owned by various persons, was a vivid centre of then rich country. The castle was built after castle Stupčanica in the 14th century. It was first mentioned in 1335, when king Charles I of Hungary exchanged royal estate of new Litva for castle Dobra Kuća with Dobra Kuća family. While neighbouring castle Stupčanica can be seen from far well, castle Dobra Kuća is a real place of refuge; it is located on a solitary hill surrounded by mountains in every direction and cannot be seen unless you are at the bottom of it.

The market town of Dobra Kuća was mentioned in 1510s, it belonged to Bjelovar-Križevci County. The settlement and surrounding area flourished until the conquest by Ottomans. Ottoman troops captured the castle in 1542 and henceforth controlled it by a guard of thirty men. Following the retreat of Ottomans, Dobra Kuća fell into decay and disrepair.

== Sources ==
- https://web.archive.org/web/20090206234554/http://varak.hu/
- Szabo, Gjuro (1920). Sredovječni gradovi u Hrvatskoj i Slavoniji [Medieval cities in Croatia and Slavonia] (PDF) (in Croatian). Zagreb: Matica hrvatska.
