= Julius III Kán =

13th century Hungarian noble

Julius (III) Kán

Ispán of Baranya
- Reign: 1294
- Predecessor: Kemény, son of Lawrence
- Successor: Kemény, son of Lawrence
- Born: Unknown
- Died: 1299
- Noble family: gens Kán
- Spouse: Clara Aba
- Father: Nicholas I

Julius (III) from the kindred Kán (Hungarian: Kán nembeli (III.) Gyula; died 1299) was a Hungarian noble from the Siklós branch of the gens Kán as the son of Nicholas I Kán, who served as ispán (comes) of Baranya and Tolna Counties in 1294. His aunt married Peter Tétény. He had a brother, Peter de Siklós, who inherited his estates and functioned as ispán of Baranya County in 1313. His sister was Helena, the spouse of James Győr.

He married Clara Aba (died before 1300), daughter of Palatine Finta Aba.

== Sources ==
- (in Hungarian) Karácsonyi, János (1901). A magyar nemzetségek a XIV. század közepéig ("The Hungarian genera until the middle of the 14th century"). Vol. 2., Hungarian Academy of Sciences. Budapest.
- (in Hungarian) Zsoldos, Attila (2011). Magyarország világi archontológiája, 1000–1301 ("Secular Archontology of Hungary, 1000–1301"). História, MTA Történettudományi Intézete. Budapest. ISBN 978-963-9627-38-3

Julius III Genus Kán Born: ? Died: 1299
Political offices
Preceded by Kemény	Ispán of Baranya; 1294	Succeeded by Kemény
Preceded by Gregory	Ispán of Tolna; 1294	Succeeded by Kakas Rátót
