= James Győr =

Hungarian nobleman

Master of the cupbearers
- Reign: 1291
- Predecessor: Kemény, son of Lawrence
- Successor: Nicholas Rátót
- Died: 1314 or 1315
- Noble family: gens Győr
- Spouse: Helena Kán (Siklósi)
- Issue: Nicholas Gyulai; Conrad Kéméndi; Csala a daughter (?)
- Father: Conrad I

James from the kindred Győr (Hungarian: Győr nembeli Jakab; died 1314 or 1315) was a Hungarian nobleman at the turn of the 13th and 14th centuries, who served as Master of the cupbearers in 1291. Also known as James of Óvár (Hungarian: Óvári Jakab) then James of Kéménd (Hungarian: Kéméndi Jakab) in contemporary documents, he was the progenitor of the Gyulai, Geszti and Kéméndi noble families.

== Life ==
James was born into the Óvár branch of the gens (clan) Győr of German origin, as one of the two sons of Conrad I, Master of the cupbearers. His brother was Stephen III (fl. 1302–14). He also had two sisters; Catherine, who married Miske Rátót, thus they became direct ascendants to the illustrious Batthyány family; and an unidentified sister, who married local noble George Balog of Harsány. In 1297 or 1298, James married Helena, the daughter of Nicholas Kán from the Siklós branch (and also a sister of Julius). Their marriage produced three or four children: Nicholas was the first member of the Gyulai family (who located in present-day Belvárdgyula) and also ancestor of its cadet branch, the Geszti family, while Conrad III settled down in Kéménd (today Máriakéménd) and became head of the Kéméndi family. James also had two daughters: Csala, who was betrothed to James, son of Mizse the Saracen and an unidentified daughter, who married Cibak Hont-Pázmány (she is possibly identical with Csala).

He is first mentioned by contemporary records in 1282, when his long-lived father Conrad was already expelled from his landholdings in Northwest Hungary by the powerful Kőszegi family. James and his brother Stephen III lived in Baranya County. There James was embroiled in conflict with Kemény, son of Lawrence, ancestor of the Cseményi family, whose troops burned and perished his three villages, murdered his six Italian (or Walloon) serfs and captured and robbed James himself. He redeemed his freedom for 100 silver denari. In October 1285, the Pécs Chapter declared Kemény's act as unlawful and unfounded and ordered to pay damages. The chapter also sentenced Kemény to 73-day imprisonment beginning on 12 May 1286 to a house owned by the Dominican friars of Pécs. According to the verdict, Kemény had to apologize barefoot, with his belt off, begging to James after his release, but it is likely that the verdict was never implemented.

The Óvár branch's new seat was built in Kéménd by the early 1290s, where James also resided. As the Kőszegi dominion gradually expanded into the region Baranya, both Conrad and James became a loyal supporter of Andrew III of Hungary. James was appointed Master of the cupbearers for a short time in 1291. In the next year, he functioned as ispán of Moson County, but this position was merely nominal as the territory of the county was seized by the Kőszegis since the 1280s. In addition, by that time, the center of interests of the family has shifted to Baranya County. Predominantly James appeared his father's side in contemporary documents. Conrad and James were granted exemption from the jurisdiction of the ispán of Baranya County by Andrew III of Hungary, but in reality this did not prevail due to the anarchic conditions. Nevertheless, the Győrs' possessions were constantly harassed by the troops of Kemény, son of Lawrence and Philip Kórógyi, their powerful neighbors. James, alongside his father, was one of the many patrons of the Zselicszentjakab Abbey in 1298.

After the death of Conrad between 1299 and 1302, James became head of the family. During the era of interregnum (1301–1310), he had various conflicts and lawsuits with his neighbors (e.g. Lawrence Tétény), the Pécsvárad Abbey and his brother-in-law Miske Rátót. Sometimes after 1300, the Muslim-born noble Eyza (or Ejze) persuaded James to contribute the forced betrothal of his daughter Csala and Eyza's nephew James (son of the late Palatine Mizse). During that time Csala was less than 7 years old. When she reached adulthood in 1319, she broke off the engagement. In 1300s, James gradually lost his estates in Baranya County. By the year 1305, he was successfully forced into the service of the Kőszegis, who also extended their influence in southern Transdanubia. Around 1313, John Kőszegi seized Kéménd Castle. Thus, it is plausible that James and his family swore loyalty to Charles I of Hungary, who aimed to abolish the oligarchic system after his third coronation in 1310. James died not long after, in late 1314 or early 1315. His children were still minors during his time of death.

== Sources ==
- Bartha, Annamária (2012). "Hatalmaskodás és nők 1301–1323 közötti okleveles források tükrében [Acts of Might and Women in the Charters between 1301–1323]". In Kiss P., Attila; Piti, Ferenc; Szabados, György (eds.). Középkortörténeti tanulmányok 7 (in Hungarian). University of Szeged. pp. 325–336. ISBN 978-963-306-160-2.
- Béli, Gábor (2013). "Börtönviselés perbeli egyezség alapján a XIII. században [Imprisonment on the Basis of a Court Settlement in the 13th Century]". In Máthé, Gábor; Révész, T. Mihály; Gosztonyi, Gergely (eds.). Jogtörténeti Parerga. Ünnepi tanulmányok Mezey Barna 60. születésnapja tiszteletére (in Hungarian). ELTE Eötvös Kiadó. pp. 66–72. ISBN 978-963-312-166-5.
- Engel, Pál (1996). Magyarország világi archontológiája, 1301–1457, I. [Secular Archontology of Hungary, 1301–1457, Volume I] (in Hungarian). História, MTA Történettudományi Intézete. ISBN 963-8312-44-0.
- Karácsonyi, János (1901). A magyar nemzetségek a XIV. század közepéig. II. kötet [The Hungarian genera until the middle of the 14th century, Vol. 2] (in Hungarian). Hungarian Academy of Sciences.
- Tóth, Norbert C. (2001). "A Győr-nemzetség az Árpád-korban [The Győr Kindred in the Age of Árpáds]". In Neumann, Tibor (ed.). Analecta Mediaevalia I. Tanulmányok a középkorról (in Hungarian). Budapest: Argumentum Kiadó. pp. 53–72. ISBN 963-446-174-3.
- Varga, Virág (2019). "A Győr nemzetség az oligarchia időszakában [The Győr Kindred during the Era of Oligarchy]". Első Század (in Hungarian). 20 (Autumn): 79–101. ISSN 2063-5737.
- Zsoldos, Attila (2011). Magyarország világi archontológiája, 1000–1301 [Secular Archontology of Hungary, 1000–1301] (in Hungarian). História, MTA Történettudományi Intézete. ISBN 978-963-9627-38-3.

James Genus Győr Born: ? Died: 1314 or 1315
Political offices
| Preceded by Kemény | Master of the cupbearers 1291 | Succeeded by Nicholas Rátót |
