= Ugrin Csák =

Hungarian baron

Ugrin (III) Csák
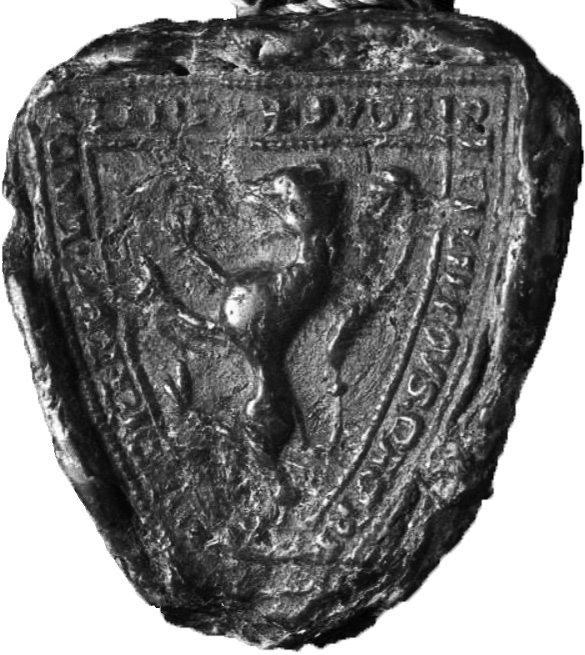
- Seal of Ugrin Csák, 1274

Judge royal
- Reign: 1275–1276
- Predecessor: Nicholas Geregye
- Successor: Mojs
- Born: 1230s
- Died: 1311
- Noble family: gens Csák
- Issue: Nicholas II
- Father: Pós

Ugrin (III) from the kindred Csák (Hungarian: Csák nembeli (III.) Ugrin, Croatian: Ugrin Čak, Serbian: Угрин Чак; died in 1311) was a prominent Hungarian baron and oligarch in the early 14th century. He was born into an ancient Hungarian clan. He actively participated in the various internal conflicts during the era of feudal anarchy since the reign of Ladislaus IV of Hungary. He held various dignities in the royal court in the 1270s. Simultaneously, he established a province surrounding his centre Syrmia in the southern parts of the kingdom.

Initially, he supported the efforts of Andrew III of Hungary, but later turned against him, and became the guardian and the most ardent domestic partisan of the young pretender Charles. After the extinction of the Árpád dynasty in 1301, he was among the so-called oligarchs or provincial lords, who ruled de facto independently their dominions. Charles I fought for the Hungarian throne during the civil war relying on his hinterland in Ugrin Csák's province. The elderly lord died in 1311, his dominion was soon integrated into the royal administration.

== Family ==
Ugrin III was born into the Újlak (or Ilok) branch of the powerful and prestigious gens (clan) Csák, as the son of Pós (or Pous), who served as Ban of Severin and Master of the treasury in 1235. Genealogist Pál Engel incorrectly distinguished two noblemen named Pós, assuming father-son relationship between them. In fact, Pós, who was considered Duke Béla's confidant in the 1220s, and the influential baron in the next decade, was identical. Accordingly, Ugrin's uncle was the renowned military leader, Ugrin Csák, Archbishop of Kalocsa. Pós died by 1240, when his minor sons and their cousin Csák were involved in a lawsuit against the St. Michael church in Vas County. During the case, the children were represented by Demetrius Csák from the clan's Ugod branch and their uncle, Archbishop Ugrin. The document, issued by Judge royal Andrew, son of Serafin on 20 December 1240, confirms that Ugrin was born sometime in the 1230s and had at least one unidentified brother, whose name and fate is unknown.

Despite Ugrin has lived at least seventy years, he, from his much younger unidentified wife, had only one known son, Nicholas, whose career rose to its peak during the early reign of Louis I of Hungary and died in 1359 or 1360. The Újlak branch became extinct with Ugrin's grandson Ladislaus, who died in 1364 without heirs.

== Early career ==
After the indirect reference to his person in the above-mentioned document from 1240, Ugrin first appeared in contemporary records in 1268, when he already served as Ban of Severin. In that year, he donated the villages of Felsőpetény and Alsópetény in Nógrád County to his faithful familiaris Denis Zsadány. It is uncertain whether Ugrin has supported Béla IV or his son Duke Stephen in their emerging conflict and civil war in the early 1260s. Following Stephen' victory and the division of the kingdom, the Banate of Severin belonged to Stephen's realm. However, Ugrin narrates in his charter that he was granted the dignity due to "King Béla's goodness". Ugrin's lands laid in both realms during that time. As historian Péter Galambosi considers, Ugrin was made ban by Duke Stephen, but later joined the allegiance of Béla, who confirmed him in that position. In the same year, 1268, but also without exact date, Alexander Karászi was referred to as the "current" Ban of Severin by Duke Stephen.

Ugrin did not hold any positions during the short reign of Stephen V. Initially, he possibly belonged to the Kőszegi–Gutkeled baronial group, which had kidnapped Stephen's eldest son and heir Ladislaus in the summer of 1272. Stephen V died shortly thereafter. The minor Ladislaus was crowned king, and fell under the influence of Henry I Kőszegi's party. Ugrin was made Master of the horse and ispán of Syrmia County (Hungarian: Szerém) in the autumn of 1272. Despite the rapid "changes of government" between the Kőszegis and their rival, the Trencsén branch of the Csáks, in the subsequent months, Ugrin retained his positions for a year, until the autumn of 1273, which reflected the relative insignificance of his political influence and court dignity in that time. His relationship with the Kőszegi group had deteriorated by then, as a result he lost his positions, when they again took the supreme power in the royal council. Ugrin joined the rival group, which was dominated by his distant relatives, Matthew II and Peter I Csák. Following the Battle of Föveny, where Henry Kőszegi was killed, Ugrin was made Ban of Severin in September 1274. He held the office until June 1275, when the Kőszegis retook the power. A new civil war broke out between Joachim Gutkeled and Peter Csák in the following months; Ugrin took the first step in the emerging conflict, when attacked Joachim's troops near Föveny, where the aforementioned battle took place one year earlier. However, Ugrin failed and the following royal charter issued by the Kőszegi-dominated royal council in the name of Ladislaus IV called him "treasonous".

Before December 1275, another shift in the government occurred; Ugrin Csák elevated into the dignity of Voivode of Transylvania. He was appointed Judge royal on 10 December. He held the dignity until January 1276, when he became voivode again and served in that capacity in the first half of that year. These high-ranking positions show that Ugrin's influence gradually increased within the baronial group, becoming its third most important leader after his relatives, brothers Matthew II and Peter I Csák. Ugrin was again Ban of Severin in 1276.

== Provincial lord ==
=== Establishment of his province ===
Joachim Gutkeled died while battling against the Babonići in April 1277. A month later, the general assembly declared Ladislaus IV to be of age, who was also authorized to restore internal peace with all possible means. These events ended the five-year chaotic conditions in the realm. Ugrin was appointed Master of the treasury around November 1277, and held the dignity until December 1279. Beside that he was also ispán of Bánya (Árkibánya) ispánate, which laid in the territory of Nyitra County. He was made Ban of Macsó and Bosnia in 1279. He was styled as "ban and lord" of the two territories by a royal document in the summer of 1279. He was again referred to as "lord of Bosnia" in December in that year. According to historian Péter Galambosi, his title reflects an extended power over his court dignities. Accordingly, when Ladislaus IV concluded an agreement with the Gutkeleds, and gave royal pardon to Joachim's brothers in June 1278, Ugrin Csák was entrusted to govern the southern part of the Hungarian kingdom, which meant a significant victory for the Csák clan.

When Ladislaus IV imprisoned papal legate Philip of Fermo in late 1279, Ugrin lost his dignity during a major change in the composition of the royal council. However, thereafter Ladislaus himself was also captured by some lords. In less than two months, both the legate and the king were set free and Ladislaus took a new oath to enforce the Cuman laws. In accordance with the agreement, Ugrin was appointed Master of the treasury again in the spring of 1280. However he lost the position within months. Based on some indirect data in the contemporary documents, it is plausible that Ugrin became disgraced in the royal court for the remaining part of the reign of Ladislaus. This includes that the king's mother, Queen Dowager Elizabeth the Cuman was created Duchess of Macsó and Bosnia in 1279, which seriously violated and threatened the local interests of Ugrin. With this appointment, Ladislaus IV intended to restore royal power over the southern border area against Ugrin, who increasingly dominated the region with his informal power.

Ugrin retired to his province across the river Sava for the upcoming decades. He extended his influence over the whole territory of Syrmia County. He built his residence, Újlak Castle (Croatian: Ilok) in Valkó County in the 1280s, after obtained the lordship from his distant relative Dominic Csák under unknown circumstances. Ugrin also acquired some lands in Požega County. He was referred to as the ispán of the county in 1293. Initially, he was a loyal confidant of King Andrew III, who ruled Hungary since 1290, after Ladislaus' assassination. According to a royal charter issued by Andrew III in July 1298, Ugrin and his familiares crossed the river Sava and defeated an invading Tatar army, who had plundered the region of Macsó. The two generals of the Tatars were executed and their heads were sent to Buda. It is possible the army was hired by Bulgarian warlords Darman and Kudelin against Stephen Dragutin's realm, who ruled the neighboring Hungarian banates and northern Serbia, altogether known as Lower Syrmia. These events presumably occurred at the turn of 1291 and 1292. In the latter year, Andrew sent Ugrin to Primorje in order to escort his mother Tomasina Morosini to Hungary, but he was captured and imprisoned by certain "disloyal barons". He was freed from captivity by Radoslav Babonić, Ban of Slavonia upon the king's order. The Kőszegis rose up in open rebellion against Andrew in spring 1292, acknowledging Charles Martel, as King of Hungary. Under this situation, Ugrin's territory functioned as a buffer zone between the royal lands and Slavonia, where the majority of lords accepted Charles' suzerainty. However Andrew III appointed his mother Duchess of Slavonia to administer Croatia, Dalmatia, and Slavonia. Due to her activities, the Babonići, Šubići, and the Dalmatian towns acknowledged Andrew's rule. As previously Queen Elizabeth, Tomasina also became Ugrin's rival in the region. Ugrin held Syrmia and Valkó counties firmly under his control, but Tomasina's duchy prevented his western expansion into Požega County.

=== Charles' guardian ===
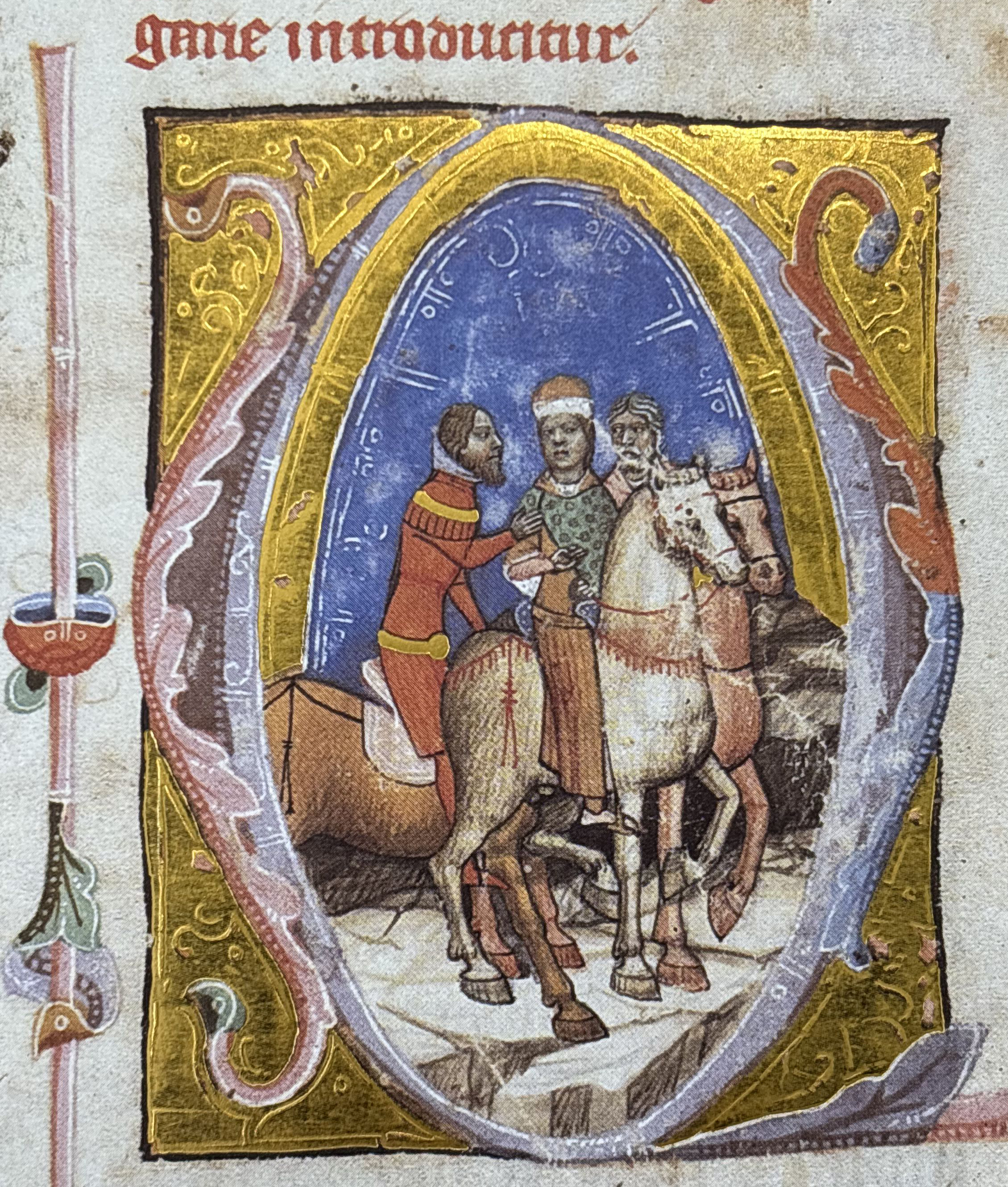
Charles's arrival to Hungary, depicted in the Illuminated Chronicle

Andrew III made his maternal uncle, Albertino Morosini, Duke of Slavonia, in July 1299, stirring up the Slavonian and Croatian noblemen to revolt. A powerful Croatian baron, Paul Šubić, sent his brother, George, to Italy in early 1300 to convince Charles II of Naples to send his grandson to Hungary to claim the throne in person. The king accepted the proposal and the twelve-year-old Charles arrived to Hungary with his escort. They landed at Split in Dalmatia in August 1300. From Split, Paul Šubić escorted him to Zagreb, where Ugrin Csák swore loyalty to Charles, who also handed over Požega Castle to him. Ugrin placed the young pretender under his guardianship. He was also called Charles' protector (Latin: conservator). Other sources confirm that he already took an oath of allegiance to the pretender prior to that. According to the Illuminated Chronicle, Ugrin was one of those lords, who requested Pope Boniface VIII to provide a new king for Hungary. In February 1300, Charles II listed Ugrin's name among those Hungarian barons, who urged him to send his grandson to Hungary. His familiaris and skilled diplomat, Benedict Geszti also visited the Neapolitan court several times in that period. It is possible that Ugrin turned against Andrew already in 1298, as he did not countersign the decrees of the national diet in that year, which aimed to destroy forts built without permission and ordered the punishment of those who had seized landed property with force. Ugrin did present neither before the king's judicial court in 1300, during a lawsuit regarding his former palace in Esztergom.

Ugrin Csák's province among the oligarchs in early 14th century

Andrew III died on 14 January 1301. With his death, the House of Árpád became extinct. A civil war between various claimants to the throne – Charles of Anjou, Wenceslaus of Bohemia, and Otto of Bavaria – followed Andrew's death and lasted for seven years. Hungary and Croatia had disintegrated into about a dozen independent provinces, each ruled by a powerful lord, or oligarch. Among them, Ugrin's distant relative, Matthew III Csák dominated the northwestern parts of Hungary (which now form the western territories of present-day Slovakia), Amadeus Aba controlled the northeastern lands, the Kőszegis ruled Transdanubia, James Borsa dominated Tiszántúl, and Ladislaus Kán governed Transylvania, while Paul Šubić ruled over Littoral Croatia and Bosnia as a de facto king. Ugrin Csák was the de facto ruler of Upper Syrmia. He was styled as ispán of Syrmia, Valkó, Bács and Požega counties in August 1303, thus he was considered the omnipotent lord in the region. Historian Pál Engel argued he held these dignities since the beginning of the 14th century until his death.

Ugrin was the most ardent domestic supporter of Charles' claim to the Hungarian throne for a decade until his death. The so-called Chronicon Posoniense ("Chronicle of Pressburg"; present-day Bratislava, Slovakia) also emphasized his importance several times, which fact suggests that the chronicle was written in the court of the Csáks' Újlak branch. In the lists of barons, which were part of the royal charters issued by Charles in the first decade of the 14th century, Ugrin's name was constantly placed to the first place, ahead of the king's another mainstay Amadeus Aba. Following Andrew's death, Ugrin had an important role in the subsequent events; under his guidance, Charles hurried Székesfehérvár, then Esztergom, where he was crowned king irregularly in the spring of 1301. Being Pope Boniface's candidate for the Hungarian throne, Charles had always been unpopular, because the Hungarian lords feared that they would "lose their freedom by accepting a king appointed by the Church", as the Illuminated Chronicle narrates. The majority of the lords supported Wenceslaus instead of him. After Wenceslaus's coronation, Charles withdrew to Ugrin Csák's domains in the southern regions of the kingdom.

Despite his advanced age, Ugrin participated in the unsuccessful siege of Buda in September 1302. Through his diplomat Benedict, he also played a decisive role in the concluding alliance between Charles and his cousin Rudolph III of Austria, in Pressburg on 24 August 1304. According to the Chronicon Posoniense, Ladislaus Kán handed over his prisoner, the self-declared claimant Otto of Bavaria sometimes in the second half of 1307 in Szeged to Ugrin, who "expelled" Charles' last rival pretender from Hungary. In the same year, Vincent, Archbishop of Kalocsa withdrew the punishment of excommunication against Peter Monoszló, Bishop of Transylvania at the request of Charles and Ugrin Csák. The elderly bishop, formerly, refused to fulfill the pope's order to excommunicate Ladislaus Kán and confiscate his unlawfully acquired lands. Ugrin was made Master of the treasury around September 1307 and held the office until late 1309 or early 1310. His dignity became temporarily the most prestigious position in the royal court, as half dozen of lords arbitrarily took the title Palatine, which caused the "devaluation" of that dignity. Gyula Kristó considered the dignity of Master of the treasury elevated into its highest status because of Ugrin's privileged position in the inner circle of Charles. Ugrin was present at the Diet of Rákos on 10 October 1307, which confirmed Charles's claim to the throne. Due to his advanced age and possible declining health, he gradually retired from public life. He did not attend the synod of Buda in November 1308 nor the second coronation of Charles I on 15 June 1309 personally; he was represented by his envoys at both events. Historian Iván Bertényi argued Ugrin Csák functioned as Judge royal from 1304 to 1311, however majority of the historians do not accept his theory, and considered that the position of Judge royal was in a state of vacancy for a decade, until Charles's third coronation was performed in full accordance with customary law in August 1310. Ugrin Csák performed his judicial role exclusively in his province in Syrmia, thus he did not hold the dignity of Judge royal necessarily. The first known office-holder in the Angevin era was Ugrin's second nephew John Csák.

== His dominion ==
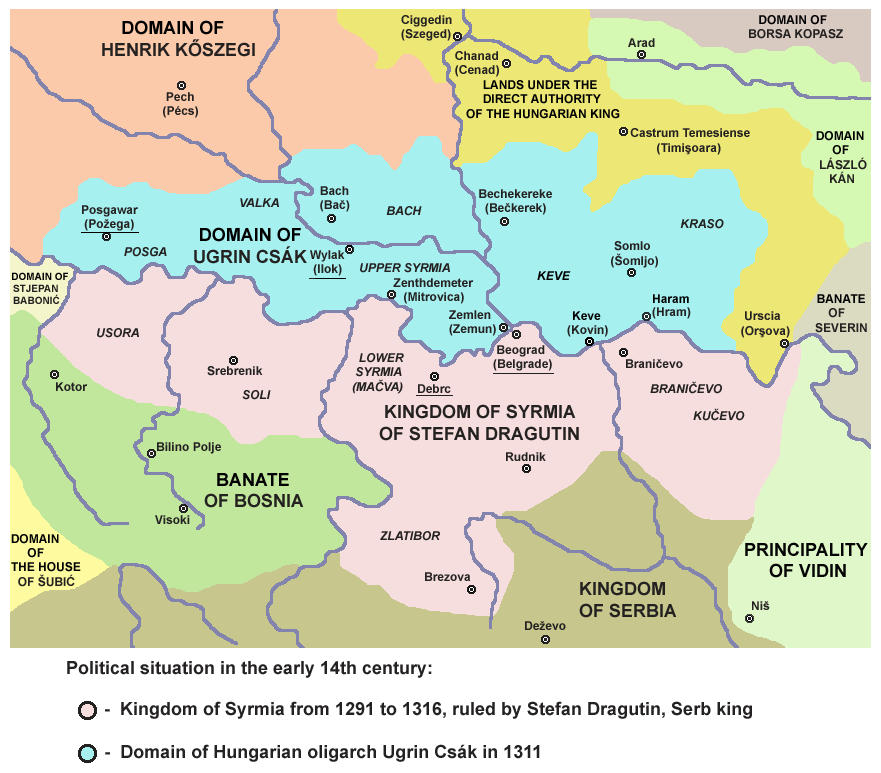
Territories under the control of Ugrin Csák (light blue), before his death in 1311 (according to historian Pál Engel and other historians)

Ugrin Csák dominated the southern part of the Kingdom of Hungary, acquiring suzerainty over Upper Syrmia and other territories along the river Sava. Historian Gyula Pauler simply called him the "powerful lord of Syrmia" in the late 19th century. Bálint Hóman considered his influence extended to Trans-Drava, Syrmia and the Banate of Macsó. According to Pál Engel and Attila Zsoldos, his dominion extended in the territory from Požega to Temesvár (present-day Timișoara, Romania), and ruled over the counties of Požega, Valkó, Bács, Syrmia, Torontál, Keve and possibly Temes and Krassó. It is plausible that Ugrin dominated Syrmia County since the end of the 1270s as there were no records of any office-holders (ispáns) in the county since then. Around the same time, Ugrin also extended his influence in the neighboring Valkó County, where he built his centre Újlak (Ilok). Following his local rival Queen Tomasina's death, he acquired the whole county for himself. In 1303, the curialis comes of Valkó County styled himself as the "official" of Ugrin Csák, which demonstrates his lordship in the region. When Albertino Morosini left Hungary shortly after Andrew III's death, Ugrin marched into Požega County and captured his duchy. Ugrin also extended his influence over Bács County during the era of Interregnum. With this expansion, his dominion spread to the other bank of the Danube. His biographer, Péter Galambosi doubted Engel's theory that the counties to the east of Syrmia (Keve, Krassó and Temes) belonged to Ugrin's province.

Because of his persistent loyalty to Charles, several historians did not list him among the oligarchs. The young pretender was put under the protection of Ugrin Csák. He resided in Bélakút Abbey (near present-day Petrovaradin, Serbia), which laid in the neighbor of Újlak, Ugrin's seat. In his dominion, Charles performed judicial powers, donated lands and customs, granted privileges of tax exemption and judicial freedom, while the possessions of those who died without an heir returned to the Crown. Charles donated lands and granted privileges in Ugrin's territory even after he left the province for Buda in 1307, when his troops seized the town. Therefore, Attila Zsoldos draws a distinction between the "oligarchs" and "provincial lords" regarding the role of the royal power in the provincial administration. While, accordingly, Ugrin was considered "only" provincial lord, Charles' other faithful partisans, Amadeus Aba or Stephen Ákos, who exercised sovereign rights in their domains but remained loyal to the king, were regarded as "loyal oligarchs". While the Aba, Ákos and Kán sons rebelled against Charles after their fathers' deaths, Charles managed to restore full royal power without any resistance in Ugrin's domain after his death, despite the fact that he had a son, as royally appointed ispáns appear at the head of the counties which had formerly belonged to his province.

Ugrin's familiares entered the service of Charles, while retained the allegiance and loyalty to their lord, which reflects a power-sharing between the monarch and Ugrin Csák in his province. Among them, Denis Zsadány was a long-time servant of Ugrin. He was present, when the king restored the privileges and rights of the church of Buda in September 1308. He attended the second coronation of Charles as the envoy of Ugrin in June 1309. His skilled diplomat Benedict also represented him in the event; on his way to home, he was captured by the partisans of Henry II Kőszegi. His remaining fate is unknown. The renowned military leader, Paul Garai initially also belonged to Ugrin's household; he served as castellan of Požega Castle, when it was granted to the arriving Charles. He participated in the war against Bohemia in the autumn of 1304. The neighboring oligarch, Stephen Dragutin's troops pillaged Ugrin Csák's domains in 1307, but Garai made a counter-attack and defeated Dragutin's army, according to the narration of a royal charter issued on 13 October 1307. Records of the destructions that Dragutin and his troops made in Valkó and Syrmia counties most probably refer to Dragutin's frequent raids against Ugrin Csák's territories in 1309 and 1310. Dragutin's army was led by John Smaragd, but he was defeated and captured by Paul Garai. Formerly, Ugrin's province also faced a series of attacks by the Kőszegis at the turn of 1304 and 1305; firstly they ravaged Požega County, then Valkó County (Henry Kőszegi issued his charter there in January 1305). Their troops marched to the town of Eng, which then was liberated by Paul Garai. Thereafter his army gradually ousted the invaders from Ugrin's territory.

Ugrin Csák died by the end of 1311; his son Nicholas confirmed one of his former land donations in Požega County on 27 December 1317 and noted the act occurred in the sixth year after his father's death. Following Ugrin's death, his province had disintegrated without resistance and merged into the royal administration. Albeit Nicholas did not inherit his father's oligarchic power, he was able to retain his family's private equity, as he issued his charter in Újlak. Consequently, Ugrin Csák's dominion became the basis of the wealth of the emerging Újlaki family, which was granted the lands once owned by Ugrin after his branch died out in 1364.

== Sources ==
- Báling, Péter (2015). "Personal Network of the Neapolitan Angevins and Hungary (1290–1304)". Specimina nova. Pars prima, Sectio mediaevalis: dissertationes historicae collectae per Cathedra Historiae Medii Aevi Modernorumque Temporum Universitatis Quinqueecclesiensis. 8. University of Pécs: 83–108. ISSN 1588-8002.
- Engel, Pál (1996). Magyarország világi archontológiája, 1301–1457, I [Secular Archontology of Hungary, 1301–1457, Volume I] (in Hungarian). História, MTA Történettudományi Intézete. ISBN 963-8312-44-0.
- Galambosi, Péter (2017). "Csák Ugrin, a hűséges tartományúr [Ugrin Csák, the Loyal Provincial Lord]". Fons (in Hungarian). 24 (3). Szentpétery Imre Történettudományi Alapítvány: 289–322. ISSN 1217-8020.
- Kristó, Gyula (1979). A feudális széttagolódás Magyarországon [Feudal Anarchy in Hungary] (in Hungarian). Akadémiai Kiadó. ISBN 963-05-1595-4.
- Kristó, Gyula (1999). "I. Károly király főúri elitje (1301–1309) [The Aristocratic Elite of King Charles I, 1301–1309]". Századok (in Hungarian). 133 (1). Magyar Történelmi Társulat: 41–62. ISSN 0039-8098.
- Markó, László (2006). A magyar állam főméltóságai Szent Istvántól napjainkig: Életrajzi Lexikon [Great Officers of State in Hungary from King Saint Stephen to Our Days: A Biographical Encyclopedia] (in Hungarian). Helikon Kiadó. ISBN 963-208-970-7.
- Szűcs, Jenő (2002). Az utolsó Árpádok [The Last Árpáds] (in Hungarian). Osiris Kiadó. ISBN 963-389-271-6.
- Zsoldos, Attila (2011). Magyarország világi archontológiája, 1000–1301 [Secular Archontology of Hungary, 1000–1301] (in Hungarian). História, MTA Történettudományi Intézete. ISBN 978-963-9627-38-3.
- Zsoldos, Attila (2012). "Hűséges oligarchák [Loyal Oligarchs]". In Baráth, Magdolna; Molnár, Antal (eds.). A történettudomány szolgálatában: Tanulmányok a 70 éves Gecsényi Lajos tiszteletére (in Hungarian). Magyar Országos Levéltár. pp. 347–354. ISBN 978-963-7228-34-6.

Ugrin Genus Csák Born: before 1240 Died: 1311
Political offices
Preceded by Alexander Karászi	Ban of Severin; 1268	Succeeded by Lawrence, son of Kemény
Preceded by Nicholas Monoszló	Master of the horse 1272–1273	Succeeded by Herbord Osl
Preceded by Paul Gutkeled	Ban of Severin; 1274–1275	Succeeded by Paul Gutkeled
Preceded by Matthew II Csák	Voivode of Transylvania; 1275	Succeeded by Ladislaus Kán
Preceded by Nicholas Geregye	Judge royal 1275–1276	Succeeded by Mojs
Preceded by Ladislaus Kán	Voivode of Transylvania; 1276	Succeeded by Matthew II Csák
Preceded by Mikod Kökényesradnót	Ban of Severin; 1276	Succeeded by Paul Gutkeled (?)
Preceded by Ivan Kőszegi	Master of the treasury 1277–1279	Succeeded by Lawrence Aba
Preceded by Albert Ákos (?)	Ban of Macsó; 1279	Succeeded by Elizabeth the Cuman; Duchess of Macsó and Bosnia
Preceded by Egidius Monoszló	Ban of Bosnia; 1279	Succeeded by Elizabeth the Cuman; Duchess of Macsó and Bosnia
Preceded by Lawrence Aba	Master of the treasury 1280	Succeeded by Lawrence Aba
Preceded by Nicholas Kőszegi	Master of the treasury 1307–1309	Succeeded by Matthew III Csák
