= Badljevina =

- Village
- Location within Croatia
- Coordinates: 45.513535°N 17.192359°E
- Country: Croatia
- Region: Slavonia
- County: Požega-Slavonia
- City: Pakrac

Area
  - Total: 14.1 km^{2} (5.4 sq mi)
- Elevation: 152 m (499 ft)

Population (2021)
  - Total: 597
  - Density: 42.3/km^{2} (110/sq mi)
- Time zone: UTC+1 (CET)
  - Summer (DST): UTC+2 (CEST)
- Postal code: 34552
- Area code: 034

Badljevina is a village in the western Slavonia region of Croatia. The settlement is administered as a part of the City of Pakrac and the Požega-Slavonia County. According to the 2021 census it has 597 inhabitants. It is connected by the D5 state road.
