= Sveti Đurađ, Osijek-Baranja County =

Sveti Đurađ
- Village (Selo)
- Saint George church in Sveti Durad

- Location within Croatia
- Coordinates: 45°44′25″N 18°14′30″E
- Country: Croatia
- County: Osijek-Baranja
- Municipality: Donji Miholjac

Area
  - Total: 16.8 km^{2} (6.5 sq mi)

Population (2021)
  - Total: 704
  - Density: 41.9/km^{2} (109/sq mi)
- Time zone: UTC+1 (CET)
  - Summer (DST): UTC+2 (CEST)

Sveti Đurađ is a village in Croatia. It is connected by the D34 highway.
