= Kán =

Kán is the name of a Hungarian noble family which gave bans (governors) to Croatia and Slavonia, voivodes to Transylvania, and palatines to Hungary in the 13th and 14th centuries.

== History ==
The Kán family were members of the Hermány clan. They crossed the Carpathian mountains together with Árpád, leader of the Magyars, and settled in Pannonia in 895. They were Counts of Siklós from the year 900.

== Members ==
Notable members of the family include:

=== Transylvanian branch ===
- Julius I (Hungarian: Gyula) Kán. Count of Siklós. Ban of Croatia and Slavonia, 1213, 1229-1235. Voivode of Transylvania, 1201-1214. Palatine of Hungary, 1215–1218, 1222-1226.
- Ladislaus I (Hungarian: László) Kán, son of Julius I Kán. Count of Siklós. Palatine of Hungary, 1242-1245. Ban of Croatia and Slavonia, 1245-1246.
- Julius II Kán, son of Julius I Kán. Count of Siklós. Voivode of Transylvania, 1230-1233.
- Ladislaus II Kán (Hungarian: László) Kán, son of Ladislaus I Kán. Voivode of Transylvania, 1260–1267, 1275-1276.
- Nicholas Kán, son of Ladislaus I Kán. Archbishop-elect of Esztergom in the 1270s.
- Ladislaus III Kán, son of Ladislas II Kán. Married a princess of the Piast royal family of Poland. Voivode of Transylvania 1294-1315. He is thought incorrectly to be the founder of the Lackfi or Lacković family.

=== Siklós branch ===
- Simon
  - Buchk fl. c. 1251
    - Nicholas I
      - Urban fl. 1281
      - Cain fl. 1281
    - Michael
      - Blaise fl. 1281
    - Peter I → Beremendi sub-branch
      - Peter II fl. 1281–1296
        - Stephen fl. 1293
  - Julius I fl. c. 1251
    - Nicholas II fl. 1266–1288
      - Julius II fl. 1283–1298 ∞ Clara Aba, daughter of Finta Aba
      - Peter III fl. 1283–1341 ∞ (1) unidentified; (2) Catherine Kaboli
        - Siklósi family
      - Helena fl. 1298–1336 ∞ James Győr
    - a daughter ∞ Peter Tétény
