= Bjelovar-Križevci County =

Historic county of the Kingdom of Croatia-Slavonia

Bjelovar-Križevci County Bjelovarsko-križevačka županija (Croatian) Belovár-Kőrös vármegye (Hungarian)
- County of the Kingdom of Croatia-Slavonia
- 1886–1922
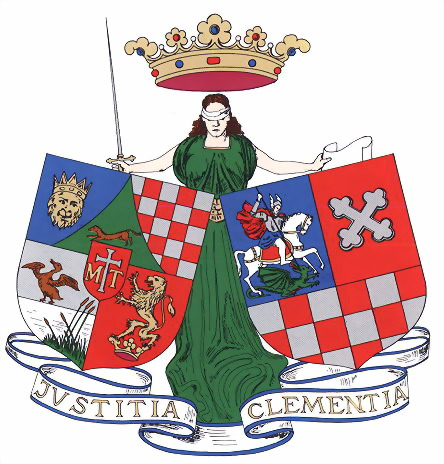
- Coat of arms

- Location of the County (red) within the Kingdom of Croatia-Slavonia (white)

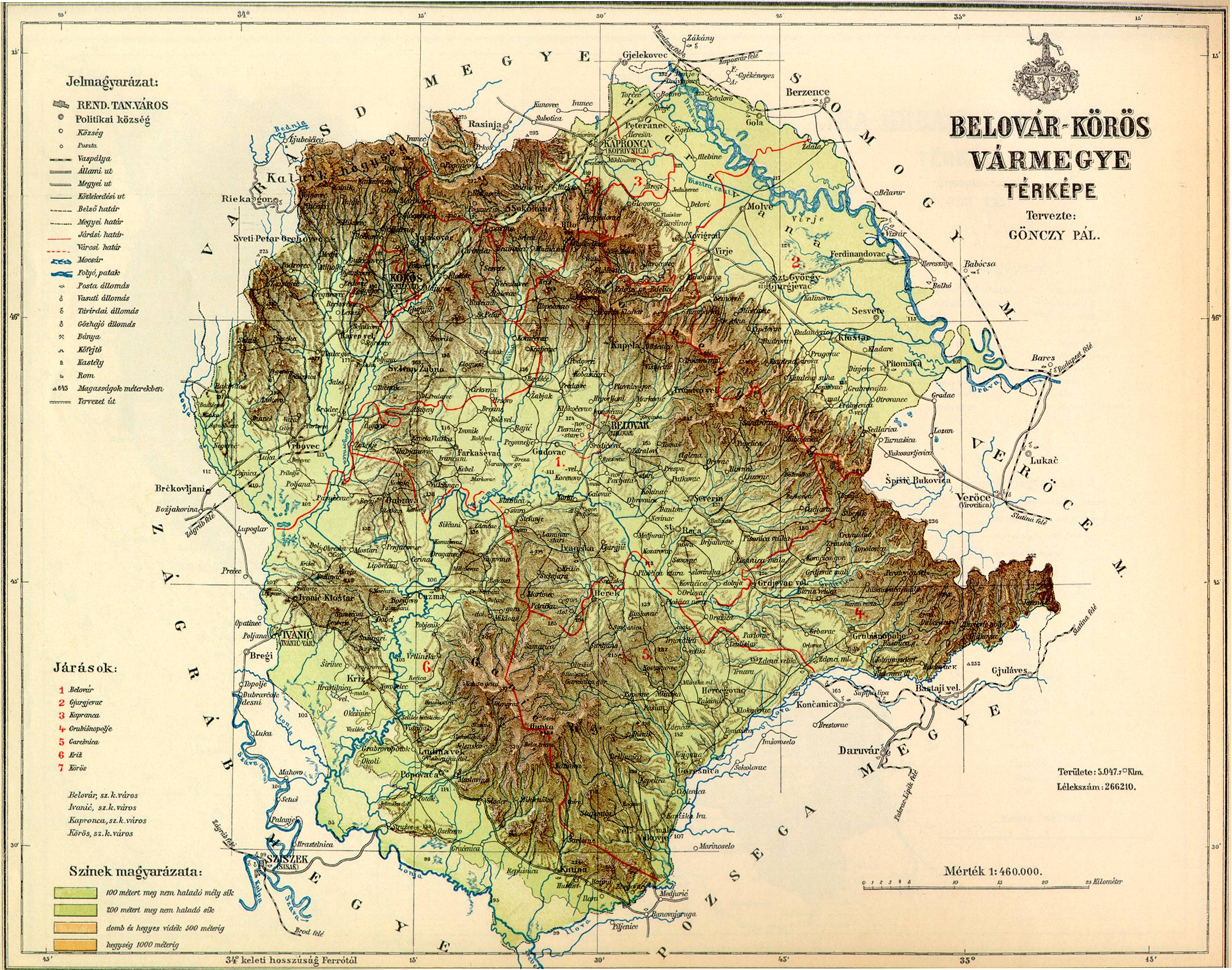
- Old map of Bjelovar-Križevci County
- Capital: Bjelovar
- Area
  - Coordinates: 45°54′N 16°51′E
  - 1910: 5,048 km^{2} (1,949 sq mi)
- Population
  - 1910: 332,592
- History
  - Established: 1886
  - Treaty of Trianon: 4 June 1920
  - Formally abolished: 1922
Preceded by	Succeeded by
Bjelovar County; Križevci County	Osijek Oblast
- Today part of: Croatia

The Bjelovar-Križevci County (Croatian: Bjelovarsko-križevačka županija; Hungarian: Belovár-Kőrös vármegye) was a historic administrative subdivision of the Kingdom of Croatia-Slavonia. Croatia-Slavonia was an autonomous kingdom within the Lands of the Crown of Saint Stephen (Transleithania), the Hungarian part of the dual Austro-Hungarian Empire. Its territory is now in northern Croatia. Belovár and Kőrös are the Hungarian names for the cities Bjelovar and Križevci, respectively. The capital of the county was Bjelovar.

== Geography ==
The Bjelovar-Križevci County shared borders with the Hungarian county of Somogy, and the Croatian-Slavonian counties of Virovitica, Požega, Varaždin, and Zagreb. The river Drava formed its northeastern border. Its area was 5,048 km^{2} (1,949 sq mi) around 1910.

== History ==
An 1885 map showing Croatia-Slavonia and south-western Hungary before the final restructuring of the Croatian-Slavonian counties. Bjelovar and Križevci counties can be seen in pale blue and green in the centre of Croatia-Slavonia.

The territory of the Bjelovar-Križevci County was part of the Kingdom of Croatia when it entered a personal union with the Kingdom of Hungary in 1102, and with it Križevci County became part of the Habsburg monarchy in 1526. However, by then most of the territory of the later county had become part of Ottoman Hungary and remained so until the Treaty of Karlowitz in 1699. After that this area became part of the Military Frontier as the Varaždin Generalate, centred on Bjelovar, which was subdivided into the Križevci (Note: The Križevci district of the Military Frontier was named after the Križevci regiment which held it; the city of Križevci itself lay within the Križevci County. The administrative centre of the Križevci district was Ivanić-Grad) and Đurđevac districts.

Following the compromise of 1867 which established Austria-Hungary from the Austrian Empire several waves of administrative restructuring took place. In 1871 the Varaždin Generalate was dissolved and it territory integrated into Croatia-Slavonia. This territory, plus parts of the Križevci County and the Kutina exclave of Požega County were reconstituted as the Bjelovar and Križevci Counties. The remainder of the Croatian and Slavonian Military Frontiers were incorporated in 1881, which led to a final restructuring of the counties in 1886; Bjelovar-Križevci County was formed from almost all of the Bjelovar and Križevci Counties.

In 1920 by the Treaty of Trianon the county became part of the newly formed Kingdom of Serbs, Croats and Slovenes (later renamed to Yugoslavia) and was formally abolished in 1922 when the Vidovdan Constitution came into force. Since 1991, when Croatia became independent from Yugoslavia, the county has been part of Croatia.

== Demographics ==
In 1900, the county had a population of 303,620 people and was composed of the following linguistic communities:

Total:

- Croatian: 225,451 (74.3%)
- Serbian: 44,654 (14.7%)
- Hungarian: 14,057 (4.6%)
- German: 4,218 (1.4%)
- Slovak: 156 (0.1%)
- Romanian: 2 (0.0%)
- Ruthenian: 27 (0.0%)
- Other or unknown: 15,055 (4.9%)

According to the census of 1900, the county was composed of the following religious communities:

Total:

- Roman Catholic: 254,062 (83.7%)
- Serbian Orthodox: 44,872 (14.8%)
- Jewish: 2,275 (0.7%)
- Calvinist: 1,115 (0.4%)
- Lutheran: 1,018 (0.3%)
- Greek Catholic: 255 (0.1%)
- Unitarian: 0 (0.0%)
- Other or unknown: 23 (0.0%)

In 1910, the county had a population of 332,592 people and was composed of the following linguistic communities:

Total:

- Croatian: 253,687 (76.28%)
- Serbian: 44,533 (13.39%)
- Hungarian: 14,224 (4.28%)
- German: 4,235 (1.27%)
- Slovak: 386 (0.12%)
- Ruthenian: 281 (0.08%)
- Romanian: 1 (0.0%)
- Other or unknown: 15,245 (4.58%) (Note: Most of them (11,126) Czech)

According to the census of 1910, the county was composed of the following religious communities:

Total:

- Roman Catholic: 282,450 (84.92%)
- Serbian Orthodox: 44,658 (13.43%)
- Jewish: 2,406 (0.72%)
- Lutheran: 1,224 (0.37%)
- Calvinist: 1,210 (0.36%)
- Greek Catholic: 635 (0.19%)
- Unitarian: 0 (0.0%)
- Other or unknown: 9 (0.0%)

== Subdivisions ==
In the early 20th century, the subdivisions of Belovár-Kőrös county were:

Districts
District	Capital
Bjelovar	Bjelovar
Čazma	Čazma
Garešnica	Garešnica
Đurđevac	Đurđevac
Grubišno Polje	Grubišno Polje
Koprivnica	Koprivnica
Križevci	Križevci
Kutina	Kutina
Urban districts
Bjelovar
Koprivnica
Križevci

== See also ==
- Bjelovar-Bilogora and Koprivnica-Križevci counties of Croatia
