= Tordas =

- Location of Fejér county in Hungary

- Location of Tordas
- Coordinates: 47.34374°N 18.74759°E
- Country: Hungary
- County: Fejér

Area
  - Total: 16.76 km^{2} (6.47 sq mi)

Population (2017)
  - Total: 2,113
  - Density: 126.1/km^{2} (326.5/sq mi)
- Time zone: UTC+1 (CET)
  - Summer (DST): UTC+2 (CEST)
- Postal code: 2463
- Area code: 22
- Motorways: M7
- Distance from Budapest: 33 km (21 mi) Northeast
- Website: www.tordas.hu

Tordas is a village in Fejér county, Hungary.

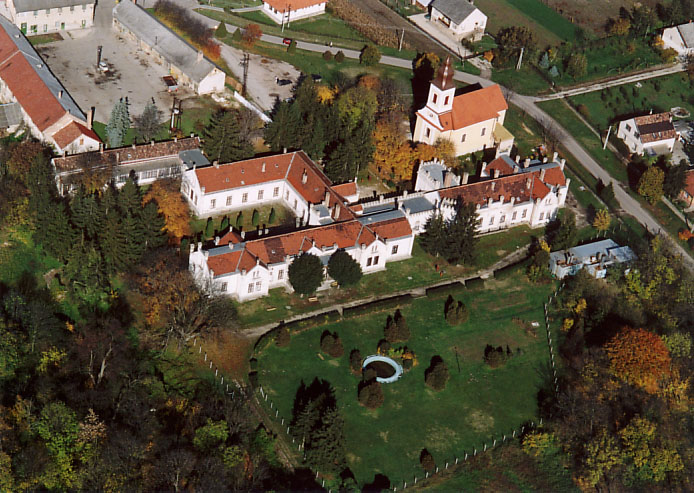
Tordas - Sajnovics palace from above
