= Varaždin County (former) =

Historic county of the Kingdom of Croatia-Slavonia

Varaždin County Varaždinska županija (Croatian) Varasd vármegye (Hungarian)
- County of the Kingdom of Croatia-Slavonia
- 12th century–1922
- Coat of arms

- Location of Varaždin County (red) within the Kingdom of Croatia-Slavonia (white)

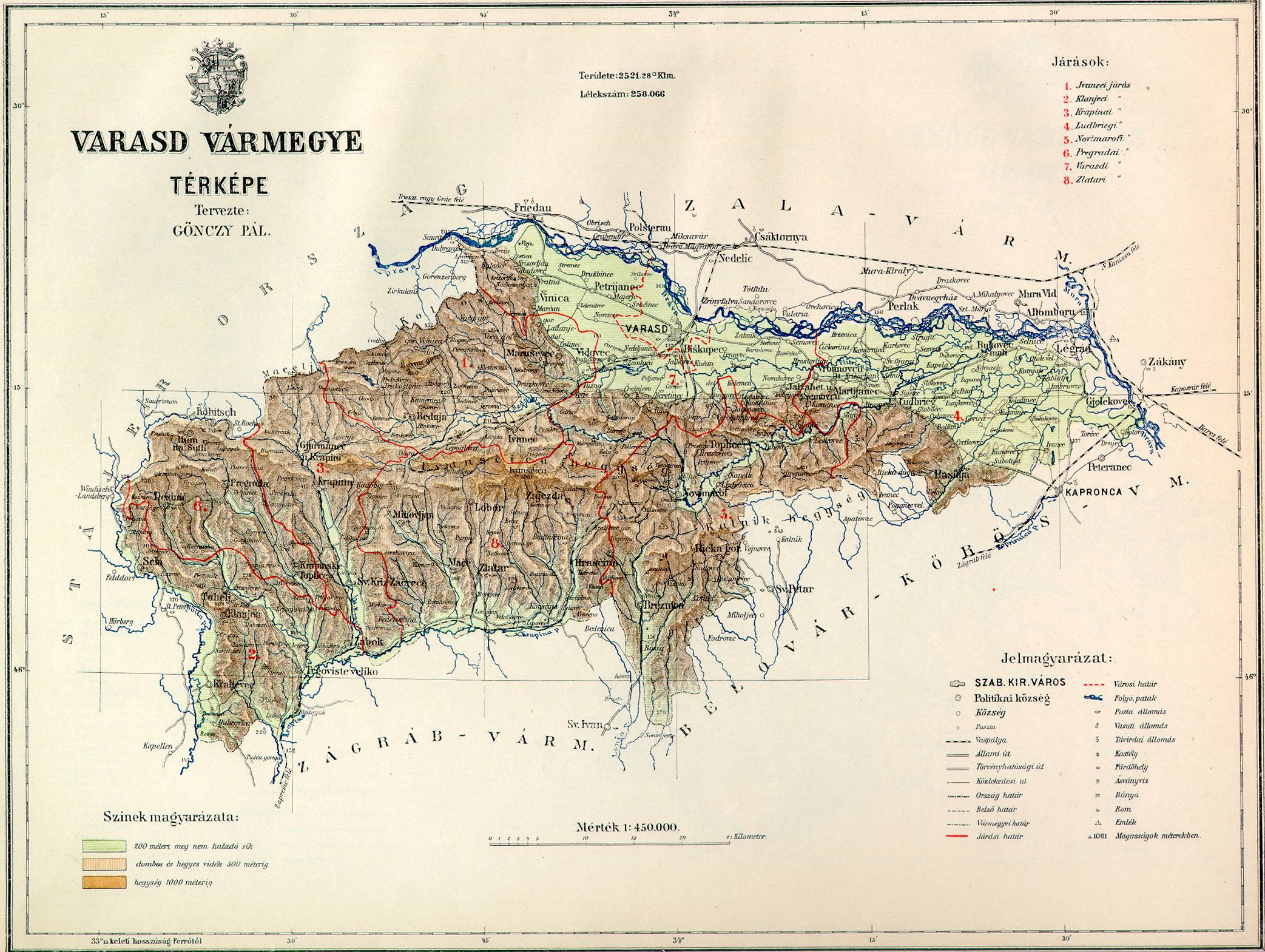
- Early 20th century map of Varaždin County
- Capital: Varaždin
- Area
  - Coordinates: 46°18′N 16°20′E
  - 1910: 2,521 km^{2} (973 sq mi)
- Population
  - 1910: 307,010
- History
  - Established: 12th century
  - Treaty of Trianon: 4 June 1920
  - Disestablished: 1922
Succeeded by
Zagreb Oblast
- Today part of: Croatia

Varaždin County (Croatian: Varaždinska županija; Hungarian: Varasd vármegye) was an administrative subdivision (županija) of the Kingdom of Croatia-Slavonia. Croatia-Slavonia was an autonomous kingdom within the Lands of the Crown of Saint Stephen (Transleithania), the Hungarian part of the dual Austro-Hungarian Empire. Its territory is now in northern Croatia. The capital of the county was Varaždin (Croatian, in Hungarian: Varasd).

== Geography ==
Varaždin County shared borders with the Austrian land of Styria, the Hungarian county of Zala, and the Croatian-Slavonian county of Bjelovar-Križevci and Zagreb. It comprised the towns and market towns of Ivanec, Jalžabet, Lepoglava, Ludbreg, Prelog, Čakovec, Klanjec, Krapina, Novi Marof, and Varaždinske Toplice.

The Drava River formed its northern border after Međimurje became part of Hungary's Zala County in 1720. Its area was 2,521 km² around 1910.

== History ==
The territory of Varaždin County was part of the Kingdom of Croatia when it entered a personal union with the Kingdom of Hungary in 1102, and with it became part of the Habsburg monarchy in 1526. After 1607, the position of the county's župan was hereditary, given to the Erdődy noble family. Until the 18th century it was part of the Varaždin Generalate of the Military Frontier.

In 1850, following the revolutions of 1848, Varaždin County gained Međimurje from the Hungarian Zala County (except for the area around Legrad, which went to Križevci County). It was divided into four (political) districts ((politische) Bezirke):

- Warasdin
- Klanjec
- Krapina
- Csakaturn (Čakovec)

In 1854, as part of Bach's absolutism, it was restructured again, absorbing much of Križevci County. The 1850 districts were replaced with a different system (still referred to as Bezirke but functionally different).

1. Kreutz (environs)
2. Kopreinitz (environs)
3. Ludbreg
4. Toplice
5. Varasdin (environs)
6. Ivanec
7. Krapina
8. Zlatar
9. Pregrada
10. Klanjec
11. Čakathurn
12. Prelog
13. Štrigovo

The cities of Kreutz (Križevci), Kopreinitz (Koprivnica) and Warasdin/Varasdin (Varaždin) themselves were city-districts (Stadtbezirke) separate from the districts listed above (which were Landbezirke).

Its territory was restored to its pre-1850 state in 1860.

An 1885 map showing Croatia-Slavonia and south-western Hungary before the final restructuring of the Croatian-Slavonian counties. Varaždin County can be seen in yellow in the north of Croatia-Slavonia.

In 1871 the Varaždin Generalate of the Military Frontier was integrated into Croatia-Slavonia. As a result the territory of the surrounding counties was altered; Varaždin County gained some territory from both Zagreb and Križevci Counties. In 1886 its territory was altered again, with some returned to Zagreb and some more gained from Križevci (which became part of Bjelovar-Križevci County in the same reform). This configuration would remain in place until the county's dissolution.

In 1918 Croatia-Slavonia de facto seceded from Austria-Hungary as part of the State of Slovenes, Croats and Serbs, which joined the Kingdom of Serbs, Croats and Slovenes (later renamed to Yugoslavia) soon after. This was recognised in the 1920 Treaty of Trianon. The county was formally abolished in 1922 when the Vidovdan Constitution came into force. Since 1991, when Croatia became independent from Yugoslavia, the county is part of the Republic of Croatia.

== Demographics ==
In 1900, the county had a population of 279,448 people and was composed of the following linguistic communities:

Total:

- Croatian: 270,897 (96.9%)
- Serbian: 2,464 (0.9%)
- German: 1,654 (0.6%)
- Hungarian: 1,061 (0.4%)
- Slovak: 126 (0.0%)
- Ruthenian: 4 (0.0%)
- Romanian: 1 (0.0%)
- Other or unknown: 3,241 (1.2%)

According to the census of 1900, the county was composed of the following religious communities:

Total:

- Roman Catholic: 275,111 (98.5%)
- Serbian Orthodox: 2,502 (0.9%)
- Jewish: 1,612 (0.6%)
- Lutheran: 161 (0.0%)
- Calvinist: 31 (0.0%)
- Greek Catholic: 26 (0.0%)
- Unitarian: 0 (0.0%)
- Other or unknown: 5 (0.0%)

In 1910, the county had a population of 307,010 people and was composed of the following linguistic communities:

Total:

- Croatian: 300,033 (97.7%)
- Serbian: 2,384 (0.8%)
- German: 1,172 (0.4%)
- Hungarian: 1,095 (0.4%)
- Slovak: 41 (0.0%)
- Ruthenian: 0 (0.0%)
- Romanian: 2 (0.0%)
- Other or unknown: 2,283 (0.7%)

According to the census of 1910, the county was composed of the following religious communities:

Total:

- Roman Catholic: 303,038 (98.7%)
- Serbian Orthodox: 2,409 (0.8%)
- Jewish: 1,341 (0.4%)
- Lutheran: 114 (0.0%)
- Calvinist: 42 (0.0%)
- Greek Catholic: 61 (0.0%)
- Unitarian: 0 (0.0%)
- Other or unknown: 5 (0.0%)

== Subdivisions ==
In the early 20th century, the subdivisions of Varasd county were:

Districts
District	Capital
Ivanec	Ivanec
Klanjec	Klanjec
Krapina	Krapina
Ludbreg	Ludbreg
Novi Marof	Novi Marof
Pregrada	Pregrada
Varasd	Varaždin
Zlatar	Zlatar
Urban counties
Varaždin

== See also ==
- Current Varaždin County
