= Nicholas I Kőszegi =

Hungarian noble

Nicholas (I) Kőszegi

Palatine of Hungary
- Reign: 1275; 1276–1277; 1284–1285; 1289; 1291; 1294–1295; 1296; 1297–1298
- Born: c. 1240
- Died: 1299
- Noble family: House of Kőszegi
- Issue: Nicholas II; John Béri
- Father: Henry I
- Mother: Henry's first wife

Nicholas (I) Kőszegi (Hungarian: Kőszegi (I.) Miklós, Croatian: Nikola Gisingovac; died 1299) was a Hungarian influential lord in the second half of the 13th century. He was a member of the powerful Kőszegi family. He served as Palatine of Hungary at various times between 1275 and 1298. He was also Ban of Slavonia three times. Albeit he participated in several rebellions against the royal power, he proved to be more moderate and conformist than his younger brothers. He swore loyalty to Andrew III of Hungary after their failed rebellion in 1292. In comparison to the other branches of the Kőszegi family, Nicholas' branch remained relatively insignificant, as he did not establish an oligarchic province independently of the king, unlike his brothers. Nicholas was ancestor of the Rohonci family, which flourished until the mid-15th century.

== Family ==
Nicholas I was born in the 1240s into the wealthy and influential Kőszegi family, originating from the gens (clan) Héder, as the eldest son of the powerful lord Henry I Kőszegi. His younger brothers were Ivan, Henry II – who were also elevated into high dignities during the age of the late Árpáds – and Peter, the Bishop of Veszprém from 1275 till his murder in 1289.

His marriage to an unidentified noblewoman produced two sons. The elder one was Nicholas II (also "the Rooster"), who inherited his domains and became ancestor of the Rohonci family (then Ludbregi), which flourished until the middle of the 15th century, but was declared disgraced by King Sigismund in 1403. According to genealogist Pál Engel, Nicholas also had another son, John, whose only known son Nicholas was mentioned with the surname "Béri" by a single document in 1368.

== Early career ==
Nicholas Kőszegi first appeared in contemporary records in March 1265, when he participated in the Battle of Isaszeg alongside his father Henry and brother Ivan. During the civil war between Béla IV of Hungary and his son Duke Stephen, Nicholas' father was a staunch supporter of the king and led the royal army against the duke. However Stephen gained a decisive victory over his father's army, and Henry Kőszegi and his two sons were captured. The Kőszegis were being held as prisoners and after the Battle of Isaszeg, Béla IV was forced to accept the authority of Stephen in the eastern parts of the kingdom. On 23 March 1266, father and son confirmed the peace in the Convent of the Blessed Virgin on 'Rabbits' Island and Henry and his two sons, alongside others, were released from captivity. When Stephen V ascended the Hungarian throne in May 1270, following his father's death, several barons, including Henry and his sons handed over their castles along the western borders to Ottokar II. They had spent the next two years in exile at Ottokar's court in Prague. Their departure caused a war between Hungary and Bohemia, which lasted until the conclusion of an agreement in Pressburg in July 1271.

Henry Kőszegi and his sons returned from Bohemia to Hungary following Stephen's death in the summer of 1272. His ten-year-old son Ladislaus IV ascended the throne. During his minority, many groupings of barons fought against each other for supreme power. The arriving Henry Kőszegi brutally murdered Ladislaus' cousin, Béla of Macsó, the only adult male member of the Árpád dynasty. The Kőszegis entered alliance with the Gutkeleds and the Geregyes, forming one of the two main baronial groups (the other one was dominated by the Csák and Monoszló clans). Nicholas' father became a key figure in the early stage of the era of so-called feudal anarchy. When Henry extended his dominance in the royal council, Nicholas served as ispán of Szana County in Lower Slavonia, from 1273 to 1274, where his father acted as ban. Nicholas participated in the Bohemian–Hungarian War in 1273, under the commandment of his father. He was present at Laa in August 1273, when Henry's army looted the surrounding town for two days. Subsequently, Nicholas was styled as ispán of Rojcsa (today Rovišće, Croatia), which laid in the territory of Križevci (Kőrös) County, in the period between 1274 and 1279. In late September 1274, Peter Csák defeated the united forces of the Kőszegis and the Gutkeleds at the Battle of Föveny. Henry Kőszegi was killed, but his sons Nicholas and Ivan managed to flee the battlefield, withdrawing their troops to the borderlands between Hungary and Austria. Thereafter Peter Csák and the young Ladislaus IV gathered an army against the Kőszegis' domain in the autumn of 1274; their troops marched into Western Hungary, pillaging the brothers' landholdings. Nicholas and Ivan barricaded themselves in the castle of Szalónak (present-day Stadtschlaining, Austria). The royal army besieged the fort, but failed to capture it because of the coming winter. Through his ambitious and unscrupulous sons, the Kőszegi family survived their paterfamilias' death.

== Powerful baron ==
=== Rebellions against Ladislaus IV ===
Despite their violent actions against the monarch, the Kőszegis regained their influence and retook the power by the spring of 1275, when Nicholas became Palatine, the most prestigious position, while his younger brother Ivan was made Ban of Slavonia. Beside his dignity, Nicholas also functioned as ispán of Sopron County. Nicholas' appointment as Palatine marked a turning point in the history of the feudal anarchy. Prior to that, the rivaling baronial groups delegated elderly honored barons to the office, for instance, Denis Péc or Roland Rátót. After 1275, when Nicholas broke this "tradition", the leading members of the two major "parties" have now placed themselves in this dignity. As Palatine, Nicholas confirmed the previous royal donation and ceded the twentieth tithe of Sopron County to the Cistercian monastery at Borsmonostor (today Klostermarienberg, a borough of Mannersdorf an der Rabnitz in Austria). Nicholas lost his dignity by the autumn of 1275, when the Csáks retook the positions in the royal council. Thereafter the Csák group launched a massive military campaign against the Kőszegi and Gutkeled dominions; Peter Csák's troops devastated Veszprém, the episcopal see of Peter Kőszegi, Nicholas' brother. Joachim Gutkeled and the Kőszegis again removed their opponents from power at an assembly of the barons and noblemen at Buda around 21 June 1276. Subsequently, Nicholas was styled as Palatine of Hungary and ispán of Moson and Sopron counties until the next year.

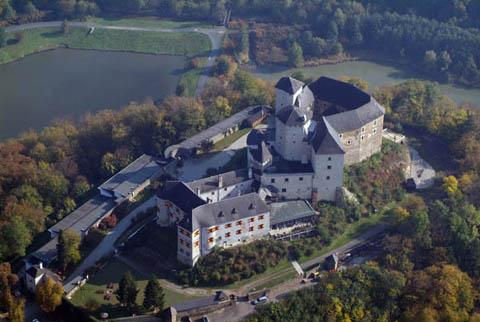
Burg Lockenhaus (Léka), owned by Nicholas Kőszegi and his descendants until the early 14th century

The Kőszegis' ally Joachim Gutkeled died while battling against the Babonići in April 1277. A month later, the general assembly declared Ladislaus IV to be of age, who was also authorized to restore internal peace with all possible means. These events ended the five-year chaotic conditions in the realm. The Kőszegis and the Babonići divided the Gutkeled's province between each other on the border of Transdanubia and Slavonia. Sometimes in the second half of the 1270s, Nicholas and Ivan handed over the family's landholdings in Varaždin County to their much younger brother Henry. In the course of the division of lands between the two elder brothers in 1279, Ivan was granted Kőszeg, Borostyánkő (present-day Bernstein, Austria) and Sárvár, while Szentvid and Léka (present-day Lockenhaus, Austria) went to Nicholas' property. In the upcoming decades, Nicholas Kőszegi extended his influence in Southwest Transdanubia, acquiring large-scale landholdings and villages, although in a more moderate way in comparison to his younger brothers, Ivan and Henry, who were among the most powerful oligarchs in the kingdom by the end of the 13th century. Sometimes before 1292, Nicholas seized the castle of Pölöske from Nicholas Hahót. The latter's brother Arnold Hahót unsuccessfully tried to recover the fort in that year. Nicholas also acquired some estates in Upper Slavonia and the castle of Rohonc in Vas County (present-day Rechnitz in Austria), where his namesake son resided permanently and his descendants took their surname after this fort, which beforehand belonged to Csépán Ják, who died without heirs. It is also plausible he built and owned the castle of Kanizsa in Zala County.

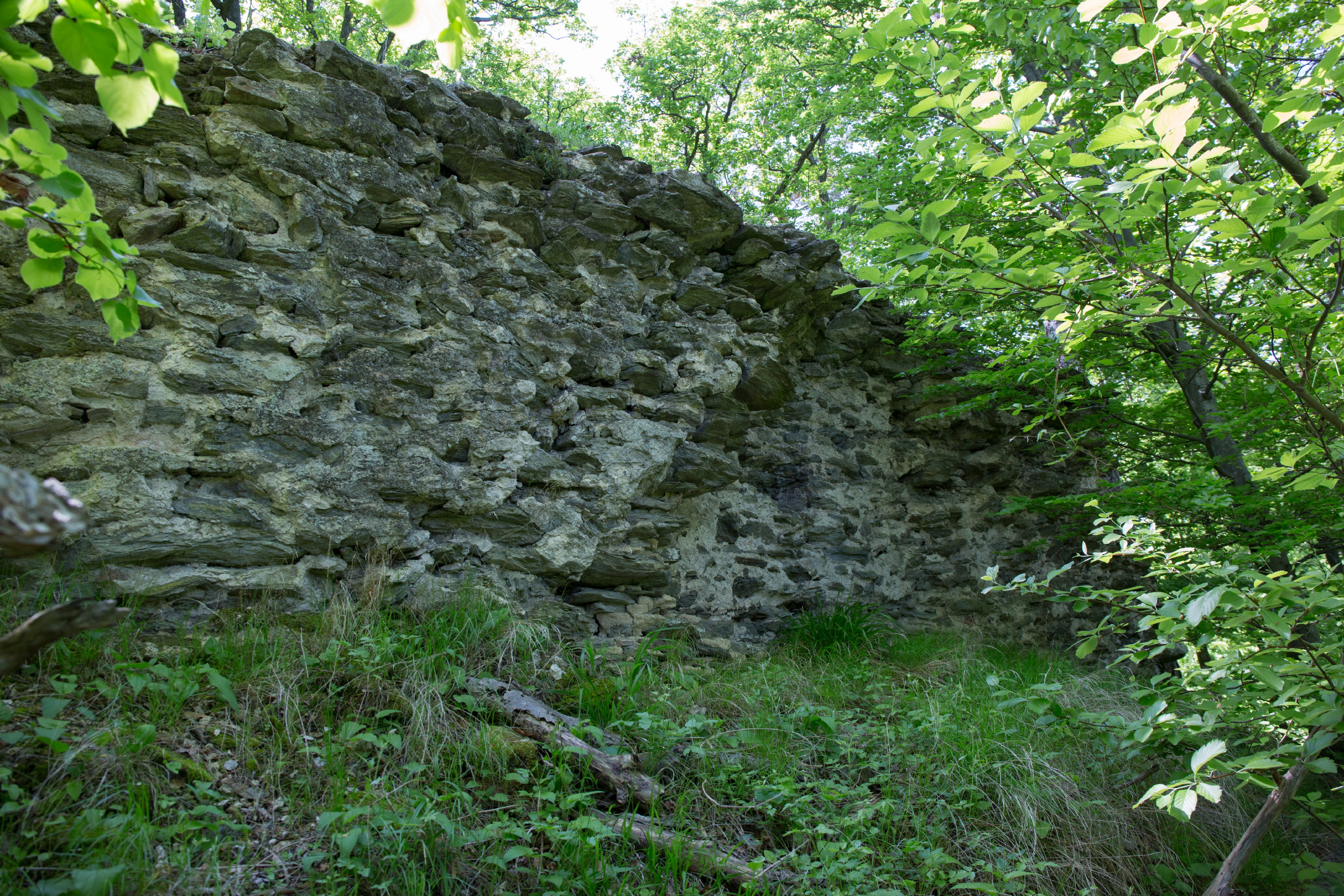
The ruins of the castle of Rechnitz (Rohonc), owned by Nicholas Kőszegi and his descendants until the early 15th century

From 1277, the Kőszegi family was in rebellion against Ladislaus IV; the politically motivated Ivan Kőszegi even invited the king's distant relative Andrew the Venetian to the Hungarian throne in 1278, who made Nicholas as Ban of Slavonia. However the victory over Ottokar II in the Battle on the Marchfeld on 26 August strengthened Ladislaus' domestic political positions. Thereafter the Kőszegi brothers pledged allegiance to Ladislaus IV in early 1279. Nicholas served as Ban of Slavonia from the autumn of 1280 to 1281. In this capacity, he and his brothers – Ivan and Peter – concluded peace with their local enemies, the Babonići and Frankopans in October 1280 at Ozalj Castle along the river Kupa. Nicholas and his two brothers, Ivan and Henry, plundered the estates of the Diocese of Zagreb at various times in the following months. As a result, Timothy, Bishop of Zagreb excommunicated them in March 1281. At the end of 1283, Ladislaus IV again led an unsuccessful campaign against Ivan Kőszegi's forts. Along with his brothers, Nicholas provided help to Ivan. Having Ladislaus failed, Nicholas, Henry and Bishop Peter stormed into Southern Transdanubia and jointly invaded and besieged the episcopal town of Pécs in March 1284. Following his failure, Ladislaus had to reconcile with the Kőszegi brothers in the spring of 1284. Nicholas was made Palatine for the third time in his career; beside that he was also ispán of Pozsony County. He held both offices until at least December 1285. Palatine Nicholas had no own literate staff, as his charter was issued by the royal chancellery at the legislative day of 20 August 1284.

In 1285, when Albert I, Duke of Austria led his forces against Ivan's province after his series of looting and pillaging raids, and intended to besiege Borostyánkő Castle, Ivan again sought assistance from Nicholas, Peter and Henry, who recruited an army of 1,000 people. In order to eliminate the powerful barons' influence over the royal council, Ladislaus managed a self-coup in September 1286, expelling members of the Kőszegi–Borsa baronial group from the government body. Also neglecting the Kőszegis' aristocratic rivals, the king appointed his own loyal soldiers and lesser nobles to the high positions. It is possible that Nicholas also lost his both offices during that time, because his family concluded an alliance with Albert. Thereafter Ladislaus IV launched his fifth and last royal campaign against the Kőszegi territory in November 1286. The king seized Kőszeg, but Ivan managed to escape. Simultaneously, on the northern front of the war, Nicholas Kőszegi and Apor Péc besieged and captured Pressburg Castle, devastating the surrounding region. Local nobles expelled Nicholas' soldiers from the area in a short time. The castle was only recovered to the royal crown in the next year. The Borsas' troops arrived from Transtisia; their joint troops defeated Ladislaus' army at the river Zsitva (Žitava) in March. Meanwhile, the Kőszegis again invited Duke Andrew to claim the Hungarian throne. After a new reconciliation, Nicholas Kőszegi was appointed Ban of Slavonia, he was first mentioned in this capacity in June 1287. Ivan's continuous looting raids in Austria and Styria resulted a large-scale war ("Güssing Feud"; German: Güssinger Fehde) with Duke Albert throughout in 1289. The Austrians captured at least 30 fortresses and settlements along the western borders from the Kőszegis, including Nicholas' two castles, Rohonc (May) and Szentvid (December).

Nicholas Kőszegi held the dignity of Palatine, according to a charter issued on 8 September 1289. As another document, which was transcribed in the next day, refers to Reynold Básztély as an incumbent palatine, historian Gyula Pauler argued there were two palatines in the kingdom simultaneously during that time, as a precursor of the established political administration during the late reign of Andrew III. However historian Attila Zsoldos questioned Pauler's theory, proving that the royal charter, which issued on 9 September, and its transcribed version on 30 September were non-authentic. Historian Tibor Szőcs considers that Nicholas Kőszegi arbitrarily used the title of Palatine in September 1289, without the recognition of the monarch. He argues some texts of the non-authentic charters from that period were based on authentic documents. Nicholas was styled as ispán of Somogy County from 1289 to 1295.

=== Fluctuating relationship with Andrew III ===
The Kőszegi family supported the claim of Andrew the Venetian to the Hungarian throne since early 1290. Ladislaus IV was assassinated by his Cuman subjects in July 1290. Andrew III was crowned king in Székesfehérvár some weeks later. Along with his brothers, Nicholas hoped that Andrew would recover their family's lost landholdings and forts from Duke Albert. He was made Palatine of Hungary around February 1291, replacing Amadeus Aba, who was sent to Poland to lead auxiliary troops to assist Władysław the Short in his unification war. Nicholas participated in the campaign against Austria. Andrew III sent him to recapture Vasvár and to recover Vas and Zala counties. Nicholas ordered the enemy to be confined in the Vasvár collegiate chapter's church then the building was set on fire. In addition to the Austrians, several local clergymen also fell victim to this, which Nicholas later tried to financially compensate the collegiate chapter for. However, the Peace of Hainburg, which concluded the war, prescribed the destruction of the fortresses that Albert had seized from the Kőszegis, which was in the interests of both monarchs. The Kőszegis were outraged at Andrew's move. Nicholas lost his dignity by the end of the year. After a few months of tension, the Kőszegi brothers rose up in open rebellion against Andrew in spring 1292, acknowledging the late Ladislaus' nephew, Charles Martel of Anjou, as King of Hungary. While Ivan plundered the royal estates in Transdanubia, Nicholas stormed and captured the castles of Pressburg and Detrekő (present-day near Plavecké Podhradie in Slovakia) with his army. He also started to besiege the fort of Szenic in Nyitra County (present-day Senica, Slovakia), but Andrew III sent a relief army and successfully forced Nicholas' troops to retreat. Subsequently, the royal army recaptured Pressburg and Detrekő with the leadership of Matthew Csák and subdued the rebellion by July.

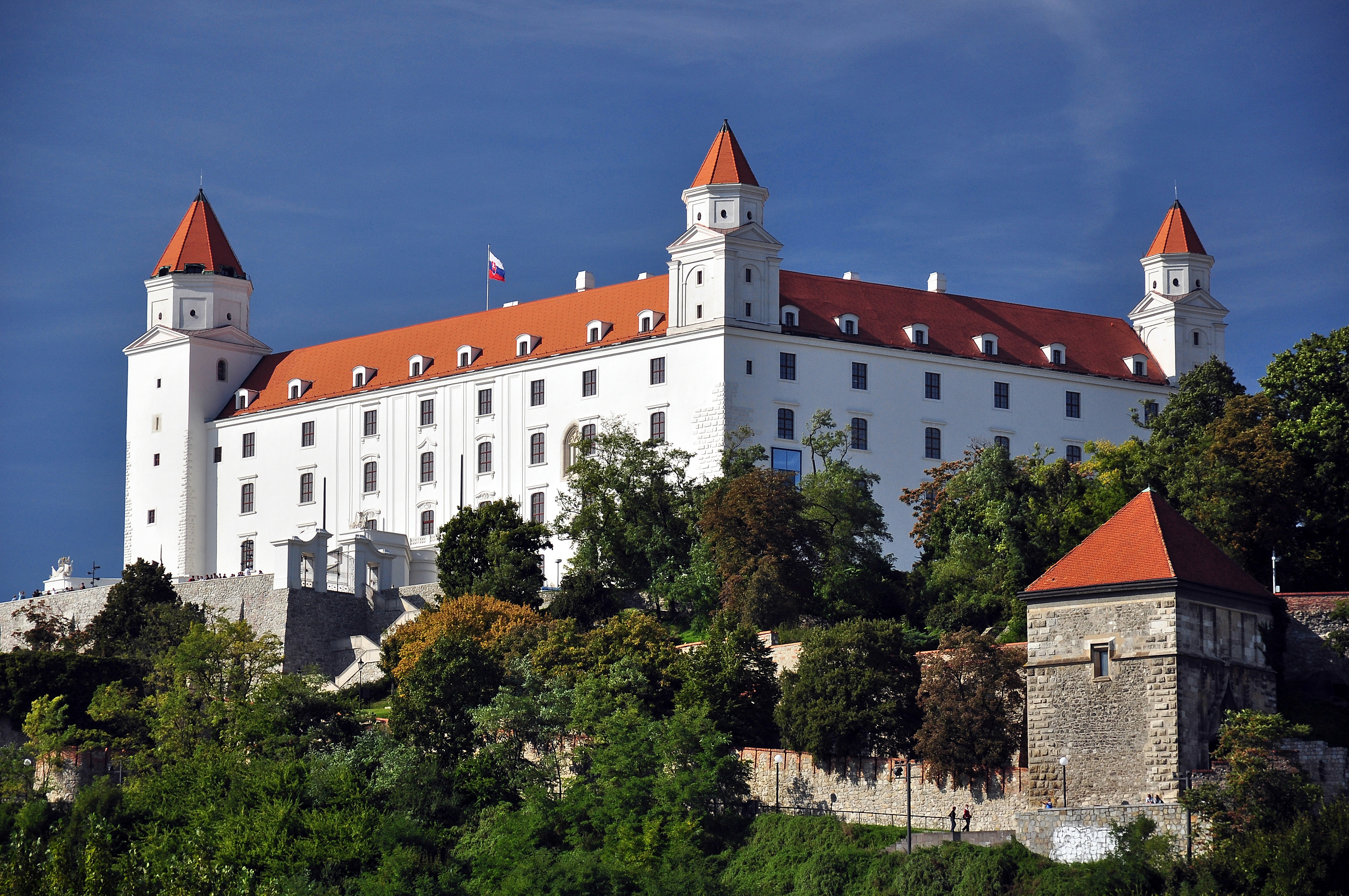
Nicholas Kőszegi besieged and occupied Bratislava Castle (Pressburg) twice: in 1286 and 1292, for a brief time in both occasions

There was a turning point in his political orientation after 1292. Nicholas did not support his younger brother, the more unscrupulous Ivan, who captured and imprisoned Andrew III during his journey to Slavonia for a brief time in August 1292. Nicholas involved in resolving the crisis and was among those loyal barons and nobles who sent their relatives or familiares as hostages to Ivan in order to liberate Andrew III. While Ivan Kőszegi remained rebellious for the remaining part of the reign of Andrew, Nicholas pledged allegiance to the monarch after their failed rebellion, thus their political orientations had gradually separated from each other. Nicholas Kőszegi served as Palatine of Hungary at least from the first half of 1294 to the summer of 1295. He was also referred to as ispán of Fejér County by multiple documents in 1295. In that year, Nicholas Kőszegi and Paul Balog, the Bishop of Pécs assisted Queen Mother Tomasina Morosini to expel the rebellious Mizse, a former Palatine from the castle of Szekcső in Baranya County, after having seized that by enforcement from the queen. They successfully besieged and captured Szekcső and handed it over to Tomasina. After a short interruption, Nicholas Kőszegi again functioned as Palatine, according to a sole document from May 1296. According to historian Attila Zsoldos, there was an agreement between the powerful Aba and Kőszegi families in the first regnal years of Andrew III; the position of Palatine rotated among them in the summer of every year. According to historian Tamás Kádár, in contrast, Nicholas never held the position of palatine after 1296, and used the title arbitrarily or was styled in token of respect in his province in Transdanubia.

Andrew III married Agnes, the daughter of Duke Albert of Austria in February 1296. Afterwards, with his father-in-law's support, Andrew tried to eliminate the Kőszegis' power and launched another war against the family in August 1296. While the Austrian troops besieged Ivan Kőszegi's some castles, Archbishop Lodomer excommunicated the brothers, including Nicholas. By October, the royal army managed to capture only Kőszeg and two other forts from Ivan Kőszegi. During the royal campaign, Nicholas successfully defended Somogyvár against Andrew's army. After Andrew's failure, the king reconciled with Nicholas sometimes after May 1297, while Lodomer also absolved him and his brother Ivan from the excommunication in 1299. After Matthew Csák's rebellion in late August 1297, Andrew III restored the dual system and Nicholas Kőszegi and Amadeus Aba were appointed co-palatines of the kingdom. Nicholas was responsible for the Cisdanubian region (Latin: palatinus citradanubialis). In the contemporary context, this meant that he had jurisdiction over Western Hungary in this capacity, while Amadeus Aba supervised the counties in Eastern Hungary (as "Transdanubia" had a different meaning than present days). They held their dignity until June 1298. When Nicholas attended the diet of 1298, he was already referred to as "former" Palatine. Nicholas was also a participant of the diet, held in the summer of 1299, where his younger brother Henry pledged allegiance to the monarch too. Nicholas died by the end of 1299.

== Sources ==
- Kádár, Tamás (2022). "Pontosítások, megjegyzések és észrevételek az 1272–1301 között működő nádorok, illetve nádori címet használó előkelők archontológiájához [Clarifications, Comments and Remarks on the Archontology of the Reigning Palatines and Noblemen who used the Title of Palatine in the Period 1272–1301]". Fons. 29 (2). Szentpétery Imre Történettudományi Alapítvány: 155–206. ISSN 1217-8020.
- Markó, László (2006). A magyar állam főméltóságai Szent Istvántól napjainkig: Életrajzi Lexikon [Great Officers of State in Hungary from King Saint Stephen to Our Days: A Biographical Encyclopedia] (in Hungarian). Helikon Kiadó. ISBN 963-547-085-1.
- Rudolf, Veronika (2023). Közép-Európa a hosszú 13. században [Central Europe in the Long 13th Century] (in Hungarian). Arpadiana XV., Research Centre for the Humanities. ISBN 978-963-416-406-7.
- Szőcs, Tibor (2014). A nádori intézmény korai története, 1000–1342 [An Early History of the Palatinal Institution: 1000–1342] (in Hungarian). Magyar Tudományos Akadémia Támogatott Kutatások Irodája. ISBN 978-963-508-697-9.
- Szűcs, Jenő (2002). Az utolsó Árpádok [The Last Árpáds] (in Hungarian). Osiris Kiadó. ISBN 963-389-271-6.
- Zsoldos, Attila (2003). "III. András". In Szovák, Kornél; Szentpéteri, József; Szakács, Margit (eds.). Szent István és III. András [Saint Stephen and Andrew III] (in Hungarian). Kossuth Kiadó. pp. 119–227. ISBN 963-09-4461-8.
- Zsoldos, Attila (2007). Családi ügy: IV. Béla és István ifjabb király viszálya az 1260-as években [A family affair: The Conflict between Béla IV and Junior King Stephen in the 1260s] (in Hungarian). História, MTA Történettudományi Intézete. ISBN 978-963-9627-15-4.
- Zsoldos, Attila (2010). "A Henrik-fiak: A Héder nembéli Kőszegiek "családi története" [The Henry Sons: The "Family History" of the Kőszegis from the Kindred Héder]". Vasi Szemle (in Hungarian). 64 (6): 651–661. ISSN 0505-0332.
- Zsoldos, Attila (2011). Magyarország világi archontológiája, 1000–1301 [Secular Archontology of Hungary, 1000–1301] (in Hungarian). História, MTA Történettudományi Intézete. ISBN 978-963-9627-38-3.

Nicholas I House of Kőszegi Born: c. 1240 Died: 1299
Political offices
Preceded by Roland I Rátót	Palatine of Hungary; 1275	Succeeded by Peter Csák
Preceded by Peter Csák	Palatine of Hungary; 1276–1277	Succeeded by Peter Csák
Preceded by Joachim Gutkeled	Ban of Slavonia; 1278	Succeeded by Nicholas Gutkeled
Preceded by Peter Tétény	Ban of Slavonia; 1280–1281	Succeeded by Peter Tétény
Preceded by Denis Péc	Palatine of Hungary; 1284–1285	Succeeded by Makján Aba
Preceded by Stephen Gutkeled	Ban of Slavonia; 1287	Succeeded by Radoslav Babonić
Preceded by Reynold Básztély	Palatine of Hungary; 1289	Succeeded by Mizse
Preceded by Amadeus Aba	Palatine of Hungary; 1291	Succeeded by Michael Szentemágócs & Amadeus Aba
Preceded by Amadeus Aba	Palatine of Hungary; 1294–1295	Succeeded by Amadeus Aba
Preceded by Amadeus Aba	Palatine of Hungary; 1296	Succeeded by Amadeus Aba & Matthew Csák
Preceded by Matthew Csák	Palatine of Hungary alongside Amadeus Aba; 1297–1298	Succeeded by Apor Péc & Roland II Rátót
