= Amadeus Aba =

14th-century Hungarian oligarch

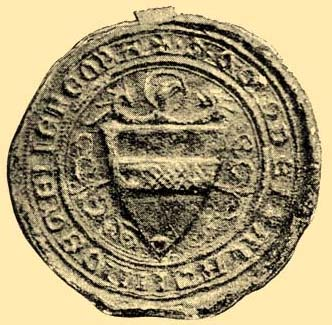
- Seal of Amadeus Aba

Palatine of Hungary
- Reign: 1302–1310
- Predecessor: several others
- Successor: James Borsa
- Born: 1254
- Died: 5 September 1311; Kassa, Hungary (today Košice, Slovakia)
- Noble family: gens Aba
- Issue: John; Nicholas III; David II; Ladislaus II; Amadeus II; Dominic; Catherine
- Father: David I

Amadeus Aba or Amade Aba (Hungarian: Aba Amadé; Slovak: Omodej Aba; ? – 5 September 1311) was a Hungarian oligarch in the Kingdom of Hungary who ruled de facto independently the northern and north-eastern counties of the kingdom (today parts of Hungary, Slovakia and Ukraine). He held the office of Palatine (nádor) several times (1288–1289, 1290–1291, 1291–1293, 1295–1296, 1297–1298, 1299–1300, 1302–1310), and he was also judge royal (országbíró) twice (1283–1285, 1289). He was assassinated at the south gate in the city of Kassa by Saxon burghers.

== Family and early career ==
He was born as the son of David I, a member of the genus (clan) Aba, who was mentioned as ispán (comes) in contemporary sources and ancestor of the Berthóty family. Amadeus had three siblings, Palatine Finta, who had rebelled against the King in 1281, Royal Judge Peter, who was a close ally of Amadeus and a daughter who married Simon from the Kacsics genus. Amadeus had at least six sons and a daughter from his unidentified wife, who had survived him. The eldest son was John, who served as Master of the horse according to his own charter. His other two sons, Nicholas III and David II were killed in the Battle of Rozgony. Amadeus' only daughter Catherine married Blessed Maurice Csák in 1301, who later became a Dominican friar. Catherine also joined the nuns at Margaret Island. This act angered Amadeus, who imprisoned Maurice in Buda for a short time, but later released him.

Amadeus fought in the Battle of Marchfeld in the troops King Ladislaus IV of Hungary sent to King Rudolph I of Germany against King Ottokar II of Bohemia (26 August 1278). In 1280, Aba became the head of Hermannstadt (today Sibiu in Romania), i.e., the royal officer appointed to administer the Transylvanian Saxons. Following the dismissal of Finta as Palatine, he rebelled against Ladislaus in 1281. As Peter Aba was appointed Master of the treasury and there is no mention of Amadeus Aba, it is likely to be declared that only Finta rebelled against the king and not the whole Aba clan.

King Ladislaus IV appointed Amadeus to the office of judge royal in 1283. In February 1285, he fought successfully against the Mongols who were pillaging the north-eastern parts of the kingdom. He received land and special privileges in Poland from Wladyslaw Lokietek King of Poland, and was referred to as Amadej in Polish.

== The powerful magnate ==
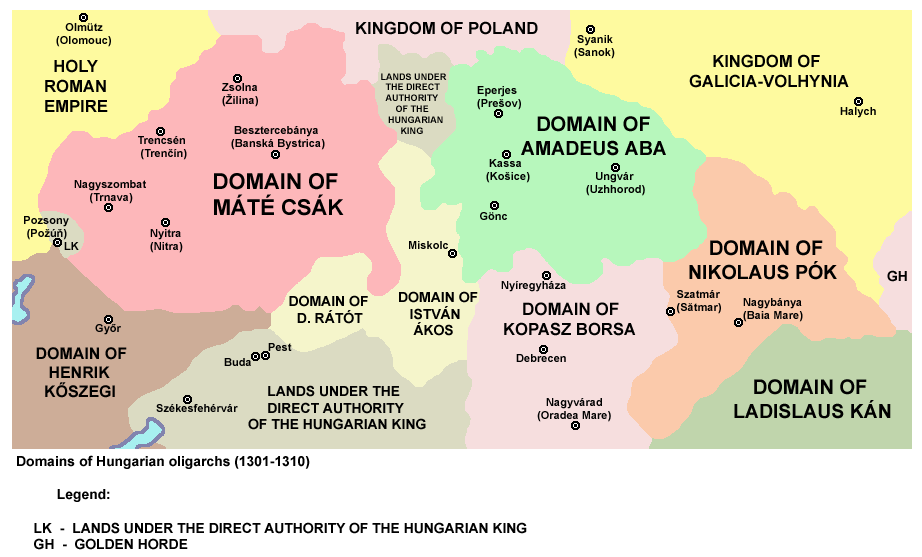
Area ruled by Amadeus Aba

After 9 August 1288, Amadeus Aba became Palatine and he held the office for the first time until 1289 when he received the office of judge royal again. Later, he rebelled against the king whose troops occupied one of his castles, Tokaj (before 27 May 1290). Following the king's death (10 July 1290), Aba became a loyal supporter of King Andrew III of Hungary who appointed him Palatine. Although the king appointed a new Palatine already in 1291, he still continued to use the title until his death, and later he was confirmed in the office several times by the kings. After 1297, Aba was among the most powerful supporters of King Andrew III and he even made a formal alliance with the king and his other followers in the second half of 1298.

When King Andrew III died (14 January 1301), some of the powerful aristocrats became the supporters of Wenceslaus, the crown prince of Bohemia, while others, including Aba, supported the claim of Charles, a member of the Angevin dynasty. Charles laid siege to Buda, the capital of the kingdom, in September 1302, but Ivan Kőszegi relieved the town. Charles's charters show that he primarily stayed in the southern parts of the kingdom during the next years. However, he also visited Amadeus Aba in the fortress of Gönc. In 1304, Scepusian Saxons and the citizens of Kassa supported by Wenceslaus unsuccessfully besieged Amadeus' centre, Gönc.

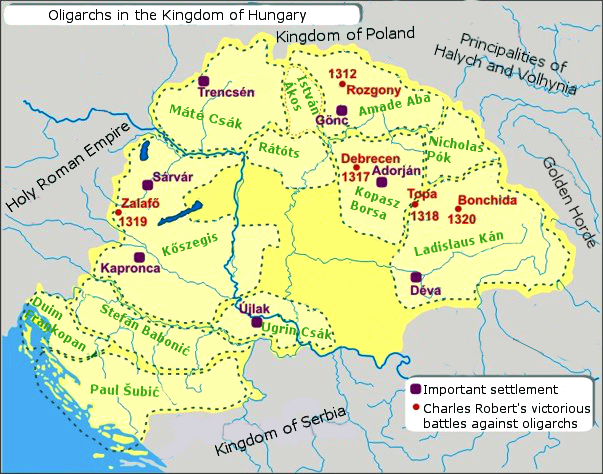
The provinces ruled by the "oligarchs" (powerful lords) in the early 14th century

Later, Wenceslaus left the kingdom (August 1304), and shortly afterwards, Aba concluded an agreement with Charles and Duke Rudolph III of Austria against Wenceslaus' father, King Wenceslaus II of Bohemia. In 1304 and 1305, he gave military assistance to Duke Władysław of Cuiavia against King Wenceslaus II who had occupied Lesser Poland. Władysław also resided in Gönc for several years. This case proves that Amadeus followed an independent foreign policy, similarly to the other oligarchs of the realm. As the Illuminated Chronicle notes, he considered Charles as his King "only with words but not with deeds".

Amadeus Aba was present at the Assembly of Rákos (10 October 1307) where the participants confirmed Charles' claim for the throne. Charles was proclaimed king at the Assembly in Pest (27 November 1308), in the presence of Aba. In 1308, he became the head (ispán) of Szepes. He was present when King Charles was crowned in Buda (15 June 1309). Afterwards, he mediated between the king and Ladislaus Kán, the powerful Voivode of Transylvania who made a promise that he would transfer the Holy Crown of Hungary to the king.

King Charles stripped him of his titles around May 1310, as Amadeus was mentioned as "former palatine" in a royal charter. In the course of the year, Amadeus occupied several castles. He wanted to expand his influence over Kassa, but the citizens rebelled against him and they killed Amadeus in a skirmish on 5 September 1311. Two of his sons, Amadeus II and Dominic were captured and held hostage alongside other 45 family members and vassals.

== Dominion Aba ==
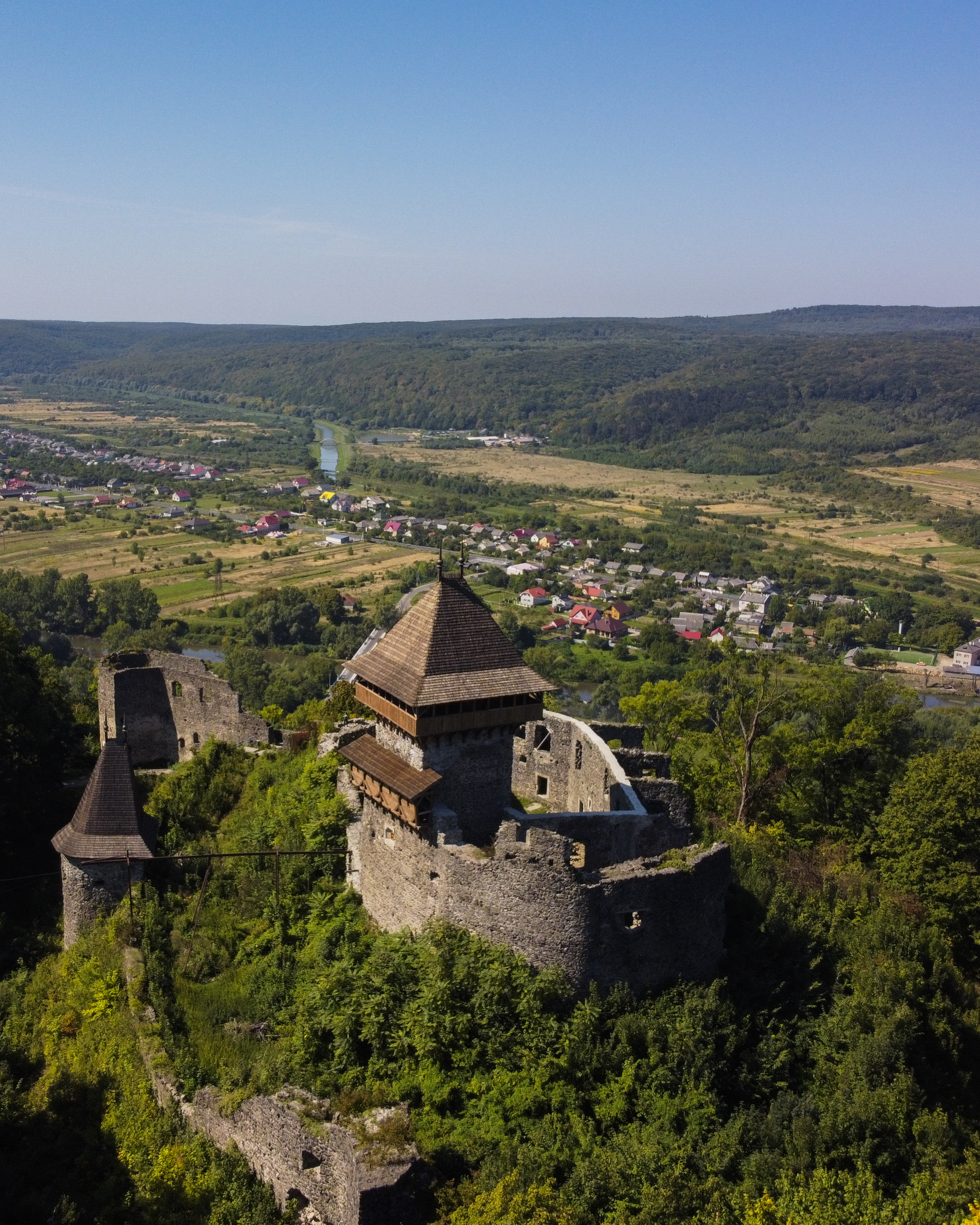
Nevytske Castle, built by Amadeus Aba

Amadeus and his brother, Finta inherited Nevicke (today Nevytske, Ukraine) from their father, where Amadeus had a castle built. They may also have inherited Szokoly (today Sokoľ in Slovakia). His dominion developed gradually in the course of the last decades of the 13th century. In 1288, King Ladislaus IV granted him the County Ung, thus he could hold the former royal possessions in the county until his death. Around 1300, he acquired Boldogkő Castle and Gönc, later he also held Regéc. In 1310, he occupied Lubló (today Stará Ľubovňa in Slovakia) and Munkács (today Mukachevo in Ukraine). By 1311, Amadeus ruled Abaúj (from his castle in Abaújvár and Gönc), Zemplén, Ung, Bereg and Szepes County, but in addition, he also had influence in some parts of Borsod, Gömör and Szabolcs County.

He usurped royal prerogatives in his dominion, e.g., he granted lands and nobility to his followers. He governed his possessions from his North-Eastern Hungarian castle in Gönc. He also expropriated the judicial function in his territory as he had an own court of justice in Vizsoly. Amadeus arbitrarily imposed duties and built castles and appointed castellans among his familiars without the permission of the king. Amadeus had own provincial court, where he elected chancellors, notaries, judges and even a Judge royal, imitating the functions of royal court. Beside duties, the trade and the business of traders were also under his influence. He continuously harassed and oppressed the town markets and traders, especially Kassa. The local nobles were forced to swear allegiance to the Aba kindred. According to a diploma issued in 1302, his troops seized the possessions of a local noble in Abaúj County and the owner himself was imprisoned and threatened with death to persuade him to pass on the family's deed of gift.

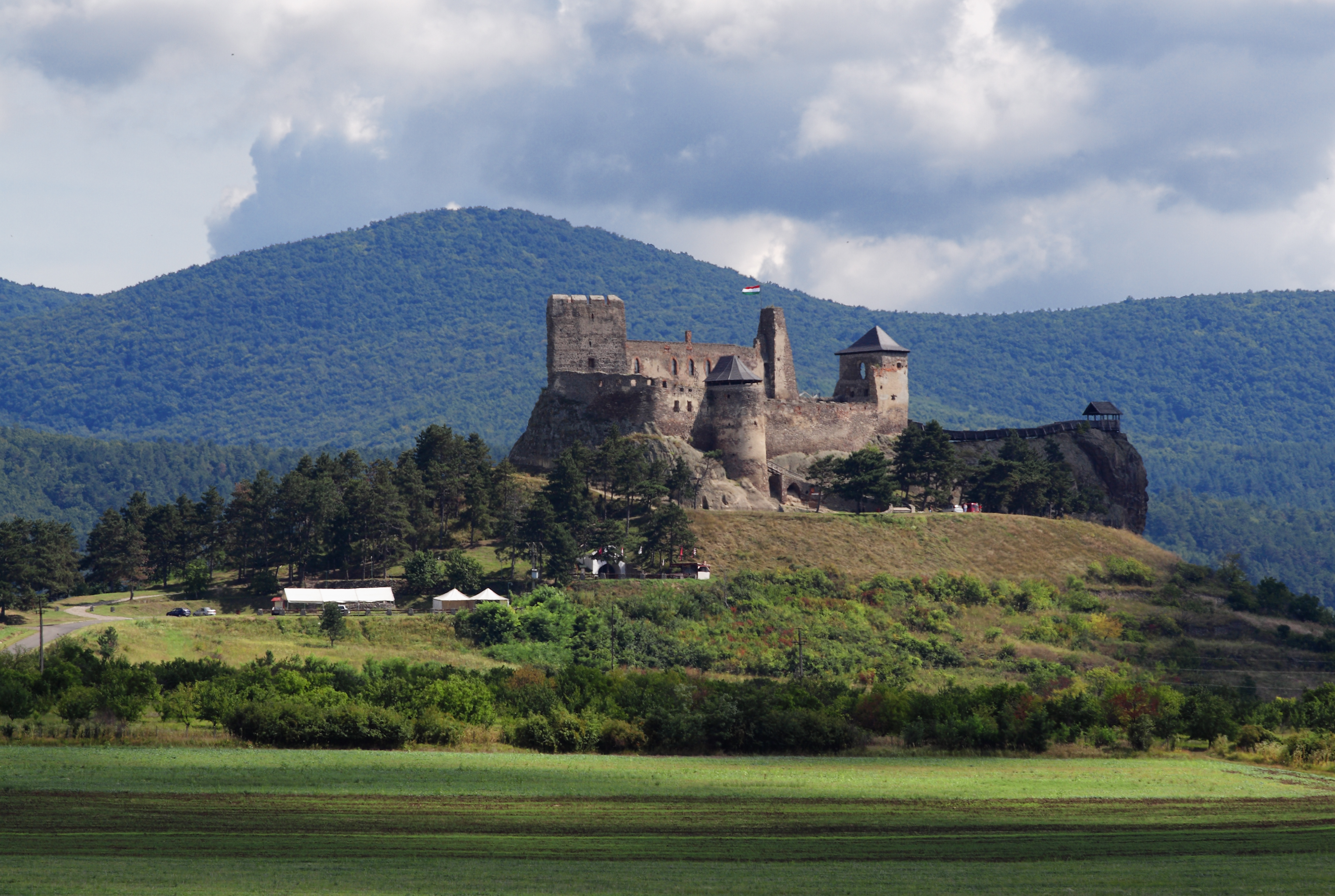
Boldogkő Castle, owned by Amadeus Aba since c. 1300

Historian Attila Zsoldos draws a distinction between the "oligarchs" (e.g. Matthew Csák) and "provincial lords" (e.g. Ugrin Csák) regarding the role of the royal power in the provincial administration. Amadeus Aba exercised sovereign rights in his domain but remained loyal to the kings (he rebelled against the central power only once in 1288, when the unpopular Ladislaus IV lost all domestic and foreign support), thus Zsoldos refers to him as a "loyal oligarch", alongside Stephen Ákos.

Following his death, Charles's envoys arbitrated an agreement on 3 October 1311 between Amadeus' widow, sons and the town, which also prescribed that the Abas should withdraw from two counties and allow the noblemen inhabiting their domains to freely join Charles. This marked end of the Aba province in North-East Hungary. However, the Abas soon entered into an alliance with Matthew Csák, the most powerful oligarch in the realm, against the king. Nonetheless, his sons could not maintain his power, and after their defeat at the Battle of Rozgony (today Rozhanovce in Slovakia) his dominion disintegrated. Taking advantage of their downfall, Peter, son of Petenye built up a dominant power in Zemplén County, while some of Amadeus' former castles and possessions were obtained by members of the Drugeth family in the 1320s–1340s.

== Sources ==
- Engel, Pál (1988). "Az ország újraegyesítése. I. Károly küzdelmei az oligarchák ellen (1310–1323) [Reunification of the Realm. The Struggles of Charles I Against the Oligarchs (1310–1323)]". Századok (in Hungarian). 122 (1–2). Magyar Történelmi Társulat: 89–146. ISSN 0039-8098.
- Engel, Pál (1996). Magyarország világi archontológiája, 1301–1457, I [Secular Archontology of Hungary, 1301–1457, Volume I] (in Hungarian). História, MTA Történettudományi Intézete. ISBN 963-8312-44-0.
- Feld, István (1985). "A gönci Amadé-vár [The Amadeus Castle of Gönc]". In Szabadfalvi, József; Viga, Gyula (eds.). A Herman Ottó Múzeum Évkönyve XXII–XXIII (in Hungarian). Herman Ottó Múzeum. pp. 59–73. ISSN 0544-4225.
- Kristó, Gyula (1978). A rozgonyi csata [The Battle of Rozgony] (in Hungarian). Akadémiai Kiadó. ISBN 963-05-1461-3.
- Kristó, Gyula (1979). A feudális széttagolódás Magyarországon [Feudal Anarchy in Hungary] (in Hungarian). Akadémiai Kiadó. ISBN 963-05-1595-4.
- Kristó, Gyula (1999). "I. Károly király főúri elitje (1301–1309) [The Aristocratic Elite of King Charles I, 1301–1309]". Századok (in Hungarian). 133 (1). Magyar Történelmi Társulat: 41–62. ISSN 0039-8098.
- Kristó, Gyula (2003). "I. Károly király harcai a tartományurak ellen (1310–1323) [The Struggles of Charles I Against the Oligarchs (1310–1323)]". Századok (in Hungarian). 137 (2). Magyar Történelmi Társulat: 297–347. ISSN 0039-8098.
- Markó, László (2006). A magyar állam főméltóságai Szent Istvántól napjainkig: Életrajzi Lexikon [Great Officers of State in Hungary from King Saint Stephen to Our Days: A Biographical Encyclopedia] (in Hungarian). Helikon Kiadó. ISBN 963-208-970-7.
- Szőcs, Tibor (2014). A nádori intézmény korai története, 1000–1342 [An Early History of the Palatinal Institution: 1000–1342] (in Hungarian). Magyar Tudományos Akadémia Támogatott Kutatások Irodája. ISBN 978-963-508-697-9.
- Szűcs, Jenő (2002). Az utolsó Árpádok [The Last Árpáds] (in Hungarian). Osiris Kiadó. ISBN 963-389-271-6.
- Zsoldos, Attila (1997a). "Téténytől a Hód-tóig. Az 1279 és 1282 közötti évek politikatörténetének vázlata [From Tétény to Hód Lake: Outline of the Political History of the Years Between 1279 and 1282]". Történelmi Szemle (in Hungarian). 39 (1). Hungarian Academy of Sciences: 69–98. ISSN 0040-9634.
- Zsoldos, Attila (1997b). "Kassa túszai (Pillanatfelvétel 1311-ből Aba Amadé famíliájáról) [The Hostages of Kassa (A Snapshot of Amadeus Aba's Family from 1311)]". Történelmi Szemle (in Hungarian). 39 (3–4). Hungarian Academy of Sciences: 345–362. ISSN 0040-9634.
- Zsoldos, Attila (2011a). Magyarország világi archontológiája, 1000–1301 [Secular Archontology of Hungary, 1000–1301] (in Hungarian). História, MTA Történettudományi Intézete. ISBN 978-963-9627-38-3.
- Zsoldos, Attila (2011b). "III. András hat nádora [The Six Palatines of Andrew III]". In Cabello, Juan; C. Tóth, Norbert (eds.). Erősségénél fogva várépítésre való: Tanulmányok a 70 éves Németh Péter tiszteletére [It is Very Well Placed for a Castle: Studies for the 70-year-old Péter Németh] (in Hungarian). Szabolcs-Szatmár-Bereg Megyei Önkormányzat Múzeumok Igazgatósága. pp. 289–299. ISBN 978-963-7220-75-3.
- Zsoldos, Attila (2012). "Hűséges oligarchák [Loyal Oligarchs]". In Baráth, Magdolna; Molnár, Antal (eds.). A történettudomány szolgálatában: Tanulmányok a 70 éves Gecsényi Lajos tiszteletére (in Hungarian). Magyar Országos Levéltár. pp. 347–354. ISBN 978-963-7228-34-6.
- Zsoldos, Attila (2013). "Kings and Oligarchs in Hungary at the Turn of the Thirteenth and Fourteenth Centuries". Hungarian Historical Review. 2 (2): 211–242.

Amadeus Genus Aba Born: ? Died: 5 September 1311
Political offices
Preceded by Rubinus Hermán	Judge royal 1283–1285	Succeeded by Demetrius Balassa
Preceded by Ivan Kőszegi	Palatine of Hungary; 1288	Succeeded by Reynold Básztély
Preceded by Gregory Péc	Judge royal 1289	Succeeded by Thomas Hont-Pázmány
Preceded by Mizse	Palatine of Hungary; 1290(–1291)	Succeeded by Nicholas Kőszegi
Preceded by Nicholas Kőszegi	Palatine of Hungary alongside Michael Szentemágócs until 1292; 1291–1293	Succeeded by Nicholas Kőszegi
Preceded by Nicholas Kőszegi	Palatine of Hungary; 1295–1296	Succeeded by Nicholas Kőszegi
Preceded by Nicholas Kőszegi	Palatine of Hungary alongside Matthew Csák; 1296	Succeeded by Matthew Csák
Preceded by Matthew Csák	Palatine of Hungary alongside Nicholas Kőszegi; 1297–1298	Succeeded by Apor Péc; Roland Rátót
Preceded by Apor Péc; Roland Rátót	Palatine of Hungary; 1299–1300	Succeeded by Stephen Ákos
Preceded by several others	Palatine of Hungary alongside others 1302–1310	Succeeded by James Borsa
