= Mizse =

Palatine of Hungary
- Reign: 1290
- Predecessor: Reynold Básztély
- Successor: Amadeus Aba
- Died: after 1295
- Issue: James; Eyzech

Mizse (died after 1295) was a noble in the 13th century in the Kingdom of Hungary, who served as the last Palatine of King Ladislaus IV of Hungary in 1290. He was born in a Muslim family, but he converted to Roman Catholicism.

== Family ==
Mizse (or Myze) was born into a family of Muslim (Böszörmény or Saracen) origin, which possessed landholdings in Tolna County in Transdanubia. He had a brother Eyza (also Heyza or Ejze), who administered the royal lands Visegrád and Pilis in 1285. He was incorrectly formerly called Lizse based on the 15th-century Buda Chronicle. Mizse had two sons, James, to whom the child Csala, the daughter of James Győr was forcibly engaged, and Eyzech.

== Career ==
Mizse and other lesser nobles, hoping the promotion of their social ascension, joined the entourage of Ladislaus IV sometime after 1285, when Hungary's central government lost power because the prelates and the barons ruled the kingdom independently of the monarch, while Ladislaus spent the last years of his life wandering from place to place. In an undated charter, Queen Isabella of Sicily referred to Mizse as ispán on the occasion of reward of her courtier Stephen, son of Kustány from the gens Ákos, who performed courier service several times between Mizse and the queen. The king appointed Mizse as Palatine of Hungary at the end of his rule in the first half of 1290. According to contemporary records, he converted recently from Islam to Roman Catholicism before his appointment. He was the only known non-Christian in the medieval Kingdom of Hungary to reach such a high position. When King Ladislaus IV was murdered by a group of Cumans in July 1290, Mizse and Eyza, along with Nicholas, the brother of Aydua (King Ladislaus' Cuman concubine) led the revenge attack against his murderers and had them executed. According to the 15th-century Buda Chronicle, one of the assassins Árbóc (Arbuz?) was cut in two with a sword, while another murderer Törtel was torn to pieces. Mizse and his soldiers massacred the entire Cuman clan along with their families and children.

Following the coronation of King Ladislaus IV's successor, King Andrew III of Hungary, Mizse and Eyza swore loyalty to the new monarch. Mizse was installed as ispán (head) of Tolna and Bodrog Counties sometime before July 1291. Mizse assisted King Andrew III in his victorious campaign against Austria in the summer of 1291. The contemporary Seifried Helbling's poetic chronicle referred to Mizse as "wild count" (der wilde grav). He strongly opposed the beginning of peace negotiations that ended the brief war and proposed the capture of Austrian castles along the Danube by using warships. Despite his participation in the war, he was dismissed from both positions by October 1291.

Andrew III appointed his mother Tomasina Morosini as Duchess of Slavonia in 1293 to administer Croatia, Dalmatia, and Slavonia, along with counties in Southern Transdanubia. Mizse and Eyza were among the local landowner nobles, who rebelled against Tomasina's rule. Eyza plundered the region of Baranya County, his men, John and Paul Véki, looted and destroyed Tomasina's estate Danóc too with its nearby monastery, both defended by Provost Andronicus of Veszprém. They also seized the revenues and lands of the Somogyvár Abbey in the region. Around the same time, in 1294 or 1295, Mizse occupied by force the royal fortress at Dunaszekcső and he refused to return it to the monarch or his mother. In response, Tomasina Morosini recruited an army; Palatine Nicholas Kőszegi, Paul Balog, Bishop of Pécs and Ladislaus Tengerdi also participated in the military campaign. Tomasina's troops successfully besieged and took the fort from Mizse. This is the last piece of information on Mizse.

== Legacy ==
According to local tradition, the Cuman Mizse district – whose origins can be traced back to the early 15th century – was named after the palatine, so Lajosmizse today commemorates his memory. The local scout team is named after Mizse since the early 1920s. Contemporary or later written sources, however, do not mention this connection. Moreover, it is not known that his person was connected to the area of Kiskunság.

== Sources ==
- Berend, Nora (2001). At the Gate of Christendom: Jews, Muslims and "Pagans" in Medieval Hungary, c. 1000–c.1300. Cambridge University Press. ISBN 978-0-521-02720-5.
- Kádár, Tamás (2022). "Pontosítások, megjegyzések és észrevételek az 1272–1301 között működő nádorok, illetve nádori címet használó előkelők archontológiájához [Clarifications, Comments and Remarks on the Archontology of the Reigning Palatines and Noblemen who used the Title of Palatine in the Period 1272–1301]". Fons. 29 (2). Szentpétery Imre Történettudományi Alapítvány: 155–206. ISSN 1217-8020.
- Kürti, László (2019). Lajosmizse. Falu, puszta, község, város. I. kötet [Lajosmizse. Village, Wasteland, Municipality, Town. Vol. 1.] (in Hungarian). Mizsetáp Mezőgazdasági Kft. ISBN 978-615-00-3686-1.
- Markó, László (2006). A magyar állam főméltóságai Szent Istvántól napjainkig: Életrajzi Lexikon [Great Officers of State in Hungary from King Saint Stephen to Our Days: A Biographical Encyclopedia] (in Hungarian). Helikon Kiadó. ISBN 963-208-970-7.
- Szűcs, Jenő (2002). Az utolsó Árpádok [The Last Árpáds] (in Hungarian). Osiris Kiadó. ISBN 963-389-271-6.
- Wertner, Mór (1893). "Mizse nádor és családja [Palatine Mizse and his Family]". Erdélyi Múzeum (in Hungarian). 10 (10): 584–587. ISSN 1453-0961.
- Zsoldos, Attila (2003). "III. András". In Szovák, Kornél; Szentpéteri, József; Szakács, Margit (eds.). Szent István és III. András [Saint Stephen and Andrew III] (in Hungarian). Kossuth Kiadó. pp. 119–227. ISBN 963-09-4461-8.
- Zsoldos, Attila (2011). Magyarország világi archontológiája, 1000–1301 [Secular Archontology of Hungary, 1000–1301] (in Hungarian). História, MTA Történettudományi Intézete. ISBN 978-963-9627-38-3.

Political offices
Preceded by Reynold Básztély	Palatine of Hungary; 1290	Succeeded by Amadeus Aba
