= Andronicus of Veszprém =

Hungarian cleric

Andronicus
- Provost of Veszprém
- Installed: 1287
- Term ended: 1297
- Predecessor: Paul Balog
- Successor: Stephen Kéki
- Other post: Vice-chancellor of the Queen

Personal details
- Died: after 1298
- Denomination: Roman Catholic

Andronicus (died after 1298) was a Hungarian cleric in the second half of the 13th century, who served as Provost of Veszprém from 1287 to 1297.

== Family ==
Andronicus had two brothers, comes Thomas and magister Peter, the archdeacon of Tolna (1295–1306), who later was elected Bishop of Pécs (1306–1314) as a confidant of Charles of Anjou, one of the claimants to the Hungarian throne.

== Career ==
Andronicus functioned as guardian (custos) of the cathedral chapter of Veszprém between 1277 and 1279. He served as provost of Veszprém at least from 1287; his predecessor Paul Balog is last mentioned in this capacity in 1285 or 1286. Andronicus was involved in a lawsuit against Queen Isabella of Sicily, consort of King Ladislaus IV of Hungary, in 1289, regarding the jurisdiction over the lands of queenly castle folks in Nagyberény. Andronicus was a confidant of King Andrew III of Hungary. He served as vice-chancellor of the queenly court under queen consorts Fenenna of Kuyavia then Agnes of Austria, from 1292 to 1297.

Sometime before 1296, Andronicus was entrusted to administer the estate Danóc in Baranya County, a property of Duchess Tomasina Morosini, the king's mother. However, when a local lord Eyza (brother of Mizse) plundered the region, his men, the Véki brothers, looted and destroyed that estate too with its nearby monastery. Several of his familiares were robbed, murdered or held hostage, including his relative, a certain magister Fancs. Andronicus suffered damage of altogether 1000 marks. Because of this, Andronius and his brothers were granted the estate Peterd with its church dedicated to St. Elizabeth of Hungary and surrounding landholdings (Vék, Erdősmárok, Podolje [Bodolya] and Csabagáta), confiscating from the Véki family, by King Andrew III in July 1296. They were also granted portions in Marosd (with its church dedicated to Catherine of Alexandria) and Szanás in Veszprém County (near present-day Somogyszil, Somogy County) by King Andrew III in 1296, 1297 and 1298, which lands were confiscated from Ambrose Szarvasdi, a familiaris of the rebellious Kőszegi family, who, in addition, died without descendants. Andronicus bought a portion in the village Csiszár (now laid in Nagybajom) in Somogy County with its former donation letter from comes Herbord Hahót in 1297.

As a representative of the cathedral chapter, he was also involved in the litigation between the Diocese of Veszprém and the convent of the Order of Hospitaller Canons Regular of St Stephen in Esztergom in the period between 1296 and 1298. Andronicus swapped his position of provost of Veszprém in order to become guardian of Székesfehérvár in the second half of 1297, replacing Gregory Bicskei. He was succeeded as provost by Stephen Kéki. As guardian of Székesfehérvár, he still supported the efforts of Benedict Rád, Bishop of Veszprém in the lawsuit against the Knights Hospitaller in Esztergom in 1298. A certain Gallus was referred to as guardian of Székesfehérvár in May 1300, implying that Andronicus deceased by then.

== Sources ==
- Karlinszky, Balázs (2014). "A veszprémi nagyprépostok archontológiája, 1079–1543 – Három prépost portréjával [Archontology of the Grand Provosts of Veszprém, 1079–1543 – With Portraits of Three Provosts]". Turul (in Hungarian). 87 (3). Magyar Heraldikai és Genealógiai Társaság: 93–103. ISSN 1216-7258.
- Szentpétery, Imre; Borsa, Iván (1987). Az Árpád-házi királyok okleveleinek kritikai jegyzéke II. kötet 4. füzet, 1290–1301 [A Critical Register of Royal Charters from the House of Árpád, Vol. 2. No. 4.] (in Hungarian). Magyar Országos Levéltár. ISBN 963-05-4199-8.
- Zsoldos, Attila (2005). Az Árpádok és asszonyaik. A királynéi intézmény az Árpádok korában [The Árpáds and their Women: The Institution of Queenship in the Era of the Árpáds] (in Hungarian). MTA Történettudományi Intézete. ISBN 963 8312 98 X.
- Zsoldos, Attila (2011). Magyarország világi archontológiája, 1000–1301 [Secular Archontology of Hungary, 1000–1301] (in Hungarian). História, MTA Történettudományi Intézete. ISBN 978-963-9627-38-3.

Catholic Church titles
| Preceded by Paul Balog | Provost of Veszprém; 1287–1297 | Succeeded by Stephen Kéki |
Political offices
| Preceded by Paul | Vice-chancellor of the Queen; 1292–1297 | Succeeded by Paul |
