= Eyza =

Ispán of Baranya
- Reign: 1301–1302
- Predecessor: John Csák
- Successor: Henry Kőszegi
- Died: after 1305
- Issue: James

Eyza or Heyza (Hungarian: Ejza, Ajza, Ajsza or Ejze; died after 1305) was a noble at the turn of the 13th and 14th centuries in the Kingdom of Hungary. He was born in a Muslim family, but he converted to Roman Catholicism. Based on the 15th-century Buda Chronicle, former historiographical works also referred incorrectly to him as Lizse.

== Family ==
Eyza was born into a family of Muslim (Böszörmény or Saracen) origin, which possessed landholdings in Tolna County in Transdanubia. His elder brother was Mizse, who was made Palatine of Hungary for a brief time in 1290. Eyza had a son James.

== Career ==
Mizse and Eyza, along with other lesser nobles, hoping the promotion of their social ascension, joined the entourage of Ladislaus IV of Hungary sometime around 1285, when Hungary's central government lost power because the prelates and the barons ruled the kingdom independently of the monarch, while Ladislaus spent the last years of his life wandering from place to place. The monarch confiscated the Pilis royal forest and the fort of Visegrád from his alienated wife Isabella of Sicily sometime in 1284 or 1285, and entrusted Eyza to administer the royal lands as ispán of Pilis and castellan of Visegrád. It is plausible that Eyza also converted recently from Islam to Roman Catholicism before his appointment, similar to his brother. When King Ladislaus IV was murdered by a group of Cumans in July 1290, Mizse and Eyza led the revenge attack against his murderers and had them executed.

Following the coronation of King Ladislaus IV's successor, King Andrew III of Hungary, Mizse and Eyza swore loyalty to the new monarch. However, when Andrew III appointed his mother Tomasina Morosini as Duchess of Slavonia in 1293 to administer the province, along with counties in Southern Transdanubia, Mizse and Eyza were among the local landowner nobles, who rebelled against Tomasina's rule. Eyza plundered the region of Baranya County, his men, John and Paul Véki, looted and destroyed Tomasina's estate Danóc too with its nearby monastery in Gecs, both defended by Provost Andronicus of Veszprém. Eyza and his men caused a damage of 1,000 marks to the provost, while his several servants were robbed or killed. They also seized the revenues and lands of the Somogyvár Abbey in the region. Around the same time, in 1294 or 1295, Mizse occupied by force the royal fortress at Dunaszekcső and he refused to return it to the monarch or his mother. Tomasina's army successfully besieged and took the fort from Mizse. This is the last piece of information on Mizse. Since Paul Balog, Bishop of Pécs and his episcopal troops also participated in the siege, Eyza stormed, scorched and pillaged the episcopal see Pécs in revenge sometime before 1300. He also took the authentic seal of the cathedral chapter, by which was prevented from judging and to perform the duties of a place of authentication.

Since that time, Eyza was known for his violent actions and dominations in the region of Southern Transdanubia. For instance, he unlawfully seized the estates Tóti and Antali in Baranya County. Following the death of Andrew III and the extinction of the Árpád dynasty in 1301, he was styled as ispán of Tolna, Baranya and Bodrog counties. A charter from July 1302 still refers to him as ispán of Baranya County. His curialis comes or vice-ispán was a certain Kuzu (Cuzu) in the latter position. In 1301, he bought the remaining portions of Tóti from the threatened Nicholas Laki and his family at a price below. Around that time, Eyza also persuaded a local lord James Győr to contribute the forced betrothal of his daughter Csala and Eyza's nephew James (son of the late Mizse). During that time Csala was less than 7 years old. When she reached adulthood in 1319, she broke off the engagement. Taking advantage of the chaotic situation during the era of interregnum, the powerful Kőszegi family dominated entire Transdanubia and governed the counties de facto independent of the royal power. From the province of Slavonia, Henry Kőszegi gradually extended his influence over southeastern Transdanubia. He was already styled as ispán of Tolna County in October 1301, while also became head of Baranya and Bodrog counties by the year 1304. It is possible that Eyza swore loyalty to Charles of Anjou, one of the pretenders to the Hungarian throne. In this capacity, he commanded his troops to plunder and devastate the regions around the castles of Međurača (Megyericse) and Rača (Racsa) in Križevci County in Slavonia, both were Kőszegi forts, in the winter of 1305. The remaining fate of Eyza is unknown.

== Descendants ==
Mizse's son, James refused to break up the engagement and sued Csala in 1320. He and his namesake cousin (Eyza's son) entered into an agreement with other owners of the settlement Tóti to use the nearby fishponds jointly in February 1326. Eyzech, Mizse's other son sold his estates in Tóti (once owned by Eyza) to John Incsei in 1334. That is the last information about Mizse's family of Muslim descent.

== Sources ==
- Engel, Pál (1996). Magyarország világi archontológiája, 1301–1457, I. [Secular Archontology of Hungary, 1301–1457, Volume I] (in Hungarian). História, MTA Történettudományi Intézete. ISBN 963-8312-44-0.
- Fedeles, Tamás (2017). ""A tűzvész tombolása következtében minden összeomlott". A középkori Pécs pusztulásai ["Everything Collapsed as a Result of the Raging of the Fire". Destructions of the Medieval Pécs]". In Varga, Szabolcs (ed.). Vészterhes idők a Mecsekalján. Háborúk, ostromok, járványok Pécsett az ókortól a második világháborúig (in Hungarian). Kronosz Kiadó. pp. 87–103. ISBN 978-615-549-79-71.
- Rudolf, Veronika (2023). Közép-Európa a hosszú 13. században [Central Europe in the Long 13th Century] (in Hungarian). Arpadiana XV., Research Centre for the Humanities. ISBN 978-963-416-406-7.
- Wertner, Mór (1893). "Mizse nádor és családja [Palatine Mizse and his Family]". Erdélyi Múzeum (in Hungarian). 10 (10): 584–587. ISSN 1453-0961.
- Zsoldos, Attila (2011). Magyarország világi archontológiája, 1000–1301 [Secular Archontology of Hungary, 1000–1301] (in Hungarian). História, MTA Történettudományi Intézete. ISBN 978-963-9627-38-3.

Political offices
Preceded by Thomas	Ispán of Pilis; 1285	Succeeded by Tralusius (?)
Preceded by John	Castellan of Visegrád; 1285	Succeeded by Tralusius (?)
Preceded by Kakas Rátót	Ispán of Tolna; 1301	Succeeded by Henry Kőszegi
Preceded by Kakas Rátót	Ispán of Bodrog; 1301	Succeeded by Henry Kőszegi
Preceded by John Csák	Ispán of Baranya; 1301–1302	Succeeded by Henry Kőszegi
