= Arnold III Hahót =

Hungarian noble

Arnold (III) Hahót
- Died: 1292
- Noble family: gens Hahót
- Father: Arnold II

Arnold (III) from the kindred Hahót (Hungarian: Hahót nembeli (III.) Arnold; died 1292) was a Hungarian noble.

He was born into the gens Hahót as one of the two sons of Arnold II, who served as Palatine of Hungary for a short time in 1242. His elder brother was Nicholas III, who rebelled against the rule of King Stephen V in 1270.

== Life ==
Arnold III was first mentioned by contemporary sources in 1266. During his brother's revolt in 1270, Arnold was still minor, as a result he avoided the impeachment, when the rebellion was crushed by Stephen V in the same year. Arnold inherited the castle of Sztrigó (or Stridó; today Štrigova, Croatia) in Zala County from his father, thus later charters also referred to him as Arnold of Stridó.

Lodomer, Archbishop of Esztergom and the Kőszegis offered the crown to Andrew the Venetian against Ladislaus IV of Hungary. Andrew arrived to Hungary in early 1290. When he crossed the brother, Arnold, an enemy of the Kőszegis, invited him to his fort of Sztrigó and captured him. Initially, Arnold tried to demand a ransom from the Republic of Venice for his valuable prisoner, but the Commune refused to pay. Thereafter, Arnold sent Andrew to Vienna, where Albert I, Duke of Austria, held him in captivity for the upcoming months. Arnold's fraud is covered by Ottokar aus der Gaal's Steirische Reimchronik ("Styrian Rhyming Chronicle"). The chronicler says that Arnold "was thought to lack loyalty in his heart" and imprisoned the deceived Andrew at the last course of the served dinner, despite the fact that he had previously sworn loyalty to him against Ladislaus IV. Arnold was greatly rewarded, when handed the prisoner over to Albert, who, according to Ottokar, took Andrew so that he would not be hurt.

Ladislaus IV was assassinated on 10 July 1290. With Archbishop Lodomer's assistance, Andrew left his prison in disguise and hastened to Hungary, where he was crowned as Andrew III on 23 July. Despite his former act, Arnold was able to preserve his power and possessions in the western border region. Furthermore, Arnold intended to marry a daughter of Ladislaus Tengerdi, one of the most loyal supporters of Andrew III.

== Death ==
After his brother, Nicholas died childless in 1291, Arnold inherited his estates. However, by then, Nicholas lost the ownership of Pölöske to Nicholas Kőszegi under unknown circumstances. According to Veronika Rudolf, the fort was captured by the Kőszegis' during their rebellion against Andrew III in the spring of 1292. Arnold tried unsuccessfully to regain the castle in the following royal campaign took place in early summer, but was killed in the skirmish.

== Sources ==
=== Primary sources ===
- Gaal, Ottokar aus der (2023). Stájer rímes krónika [Styrian Rhyming Chronicle] (in Hungarian). Translated by Bagi, Dániel; Orsós, Júlia. Arpadiana XI., Research Centre for the Humanities. ISBN 978-615-5133-24-4.

=== Secondary sources ===
- Érszegi, Géza; Solymosi, László (1981). "Az Árpádok királysága, 1000–1301 [The Monarchy of the Árpáds, 1000–1301]". In Solymosi, László (ed.). Magyarország történeti kronológiája, I: a kezdetektől 1526-ig [Historical Chronology of Hungary, Volume I: From the Beginning to 1526] (in Hungarian). Akadémiai Kiadó. pp. 79–187. ISBN 963-05-2661-1.
- Karácsonyi, János (1901). A magyar nemzetségek a XIV. század közepéig. II. kötet [The Hungarian genera until the middle of the 14th century, Vol. 2] (in Hungarian). Hungarian Academy of Sciences.
- Rudolf, Veronika (2023). Közép-Európa a hosszú 13. században [Central Europe in the Long 13th Century] (in Hungarian). Arpadiana XV., Research Centre for the Humanities. ISBN 978-963-416-406-7.
