= Gardos =

Gárdos, Gardoş or Gardoš may refer to:

Places

- Gardoš, a neighborhood in Belgrade

People

- András Gárdos, Hungarian footballer
- Florin Gardoş, Romanian footballer
- Mariska Gárdos (1885–1973) Hungarian feminist and union organizer
- Kariel Gardosh, Hungarian-Israeli cartoonist and illustrator
- Robert Gardos, Hungarian-Austrian table tennis player
