= Mariska Gárdos =

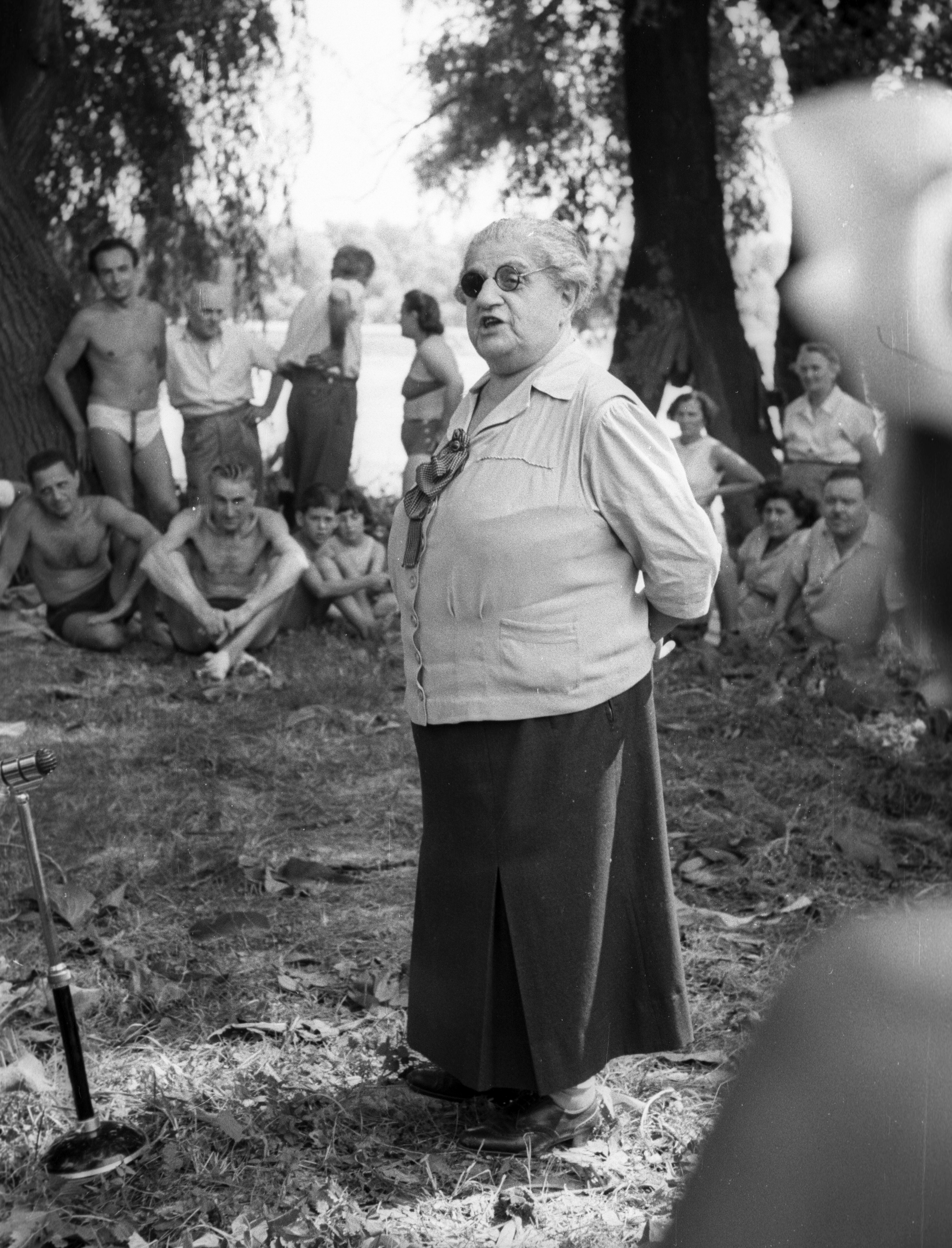
- Mariska Gárdos in 1947
- Born: 1 May 1885; Nagyberény, Hungary
- Died: 23 January 1973 (aged 87); Budapest, Hungary
- Other name: Mária Gárdos
- Occupations: Feminist, union organizer, writer, and editor
- Spouse(s): Ernő Brestovszky; György Pintér

Mariska Gárdos (1 May 1885 – 23 January 1973) was a Hungarian feminist, union organizer, journalist and editor. She was a founding member of the Union of Trade Employees (Hungarian: Kereskedelmi Alkalmazottak Szakegylete (KAS)) while still a teenager and helped to found the National Association of Woman Workers in Hungary (Hungarian: Magyarországi Munkásnők Országos Egyesülete (MME)) in 1904. After the post-World War I socialist and Communist governments were crushed in 1920, Gárdos was forced to flee into exile before returning in 1932. She joined the Communist Party as the Soviets occupied Hungary in 1945 and helped to found the Democratic Alliance of Hungarian Women (Hungarian: Magyar Nők Demokratikus Szövetsége (MNDSz)), but resigned shortly afterwards.

== Life ==
Mariska Gárdos was born on 1 May 1885 in the village of Nagyberény, Hungary and moved with her family to Budapest the following year. She moved to Kolozsvár (now Cluj-Napoca, Romania) in July 1905 where she worked as a journalist for a few years. Shortly after her arrival, she was at the center of a local media storm after she and Béla Kun criticized right-wing politician Károly Huszár. This led to the Catholic newspaper Ellenzék virulently attacking her, for which it was widely scrutinized. Gárdos subsequently returned to Budapest around 1908 where she was employed part-time in a lawyer's office. She married the socialist journalist Ernő Brestovszky in 1909, but they divorced after the death of their infant daughter, Márta. Gárdos married György Pintér in 1913, and they had a single daughter together.

She was an enthusiastic supporter of the 1919 Hungarian Soviet Republic and served on the staff of the Communist newspaper Vörös Ujság. After the collapse of the Soviet Republic in early August 1919, she fled to Vienna, Austria, and did not return to Budapest until 1932 where she died on 23 January 1973.

== Activities ==
Gárdos joined the Social Democratic Party of Hungary in 1900 and helped to found the KAS shortly afterwards. She worked to found the MME in 1904 and briefly served as its president. She published her first novel, Justice is life (Hungarian: Az igazság az élet), in 1906.
