= Paul Balog (bishop of Pécs) =

Hungarian Catholic prelate

Paul from the kindred Balog (Hungarian: Balog nembeli Pál) was the bishop of Pécs in the Kingdom of Hungary between 1293 and 1306. He studied in the University of Bologna and achieved a doctorate in law. Paul returned to Hungary with a library worthing 1,000 marks, but his books were annihilated in the course of a civil war in 1276. His superiors, including King Ladislaus IV of Hungary often sent him to Rome in order to represent their interests at the Holy See. Although he administered the vacant see of Pécs from 1287, he was only consecrated bishop in 1293. Initially, he supported King Andrew III of Hungary, but after the king's death he joined Prince Charles of Naples, the claimant supported by Pope Benedict VIII to the Hungarian throne.

== Life ==
Paul was born in a family whose ancestral lands were located in Gömör County. His two uncles, Paul and Benedict were employed in the retinue of Maria Laskarina, wife of Béla IV of Hungary. His namesake uncle seems to have paved the way for Paul to the royal court. It was also his uncle (then bishop of Veszprém) who introduced Paul to the cathedral chapter of his see by appointing him archdeacon of Somogy County. The income of this prebend enabled Paul to finance his studies in the University of Bologna from 1269 to 1273. He was later styled legum doctor, suggesting that he did not restricted his studies to canon law, but also got a degree in Roman law.

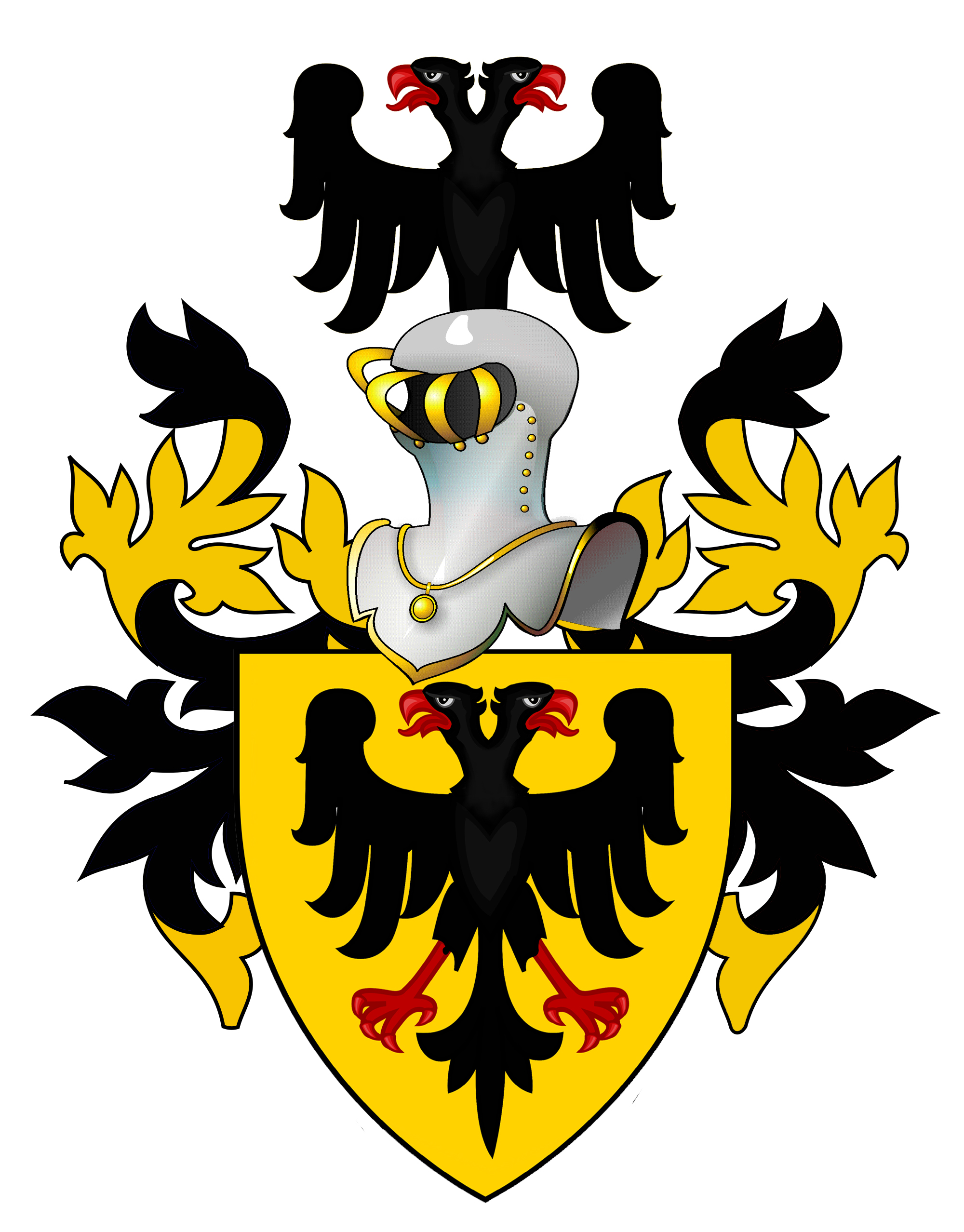
Coat of arms of the gens Balog

Although Paul only returned to Hungary a year after his uncle's death, he was appointed the provost of the cathedral chapter of Veszprém in 1275 at the latest. However, Veszprém was taken and pillaged by the troops of Palatine Peter Csák, enemy of Bishop Peter Kőszegi of Veszprém in 1276. According to Paul's account, his own damages amounted to around 4,000 marks, including the loss of his books. In short time Paul received a prebend in the cathedral chapter of Esztergom. However, at that time the canons of Esztergom were divided among the partisans of Peter Kőszegi and his opponent, Nicholas Kán, thus both prelates were elected archbishop. Peter Kőszegi sent Paul to Rome in order to receive papal support for his case, but the pope declared the see of Esztergom vacant and ordered a new election in June 1278. A royal charter of 1286 reveals that King Ladislaus IV also sent Paul several times to Rome. In addition, Paul served Elizabeth of Sicily, wife of Ladislaus IV, as her chancellor at least from 1281.

Lodomer, archbishop of Esztergom promoted Paul to the provostship of the cathedral chapter of his see in 1287, and also entrusted him with the administration of the vacant bishopric of Pécs. Although he governed the diocese from Esztergom, the cathedral chapter of Pécs started again issuing official documents after a break of nearly 20 years. Paul was consecrated bishop of Pécs in the first half of 1293. He soon assisted Tomasina Morosini, mother of King Andrew III in taking Dunaszekcső, a fortress held by the king's enemy, Mizse, the former Palatine. The queen mother also employed Bishop Paul as her chancellor from 1295 at the latest. Paul was present in Vienna at the engagement of King Andrew III's daughter, Elizabeth, to Wenceslaus, the heir apparent to the crown of Bohemia in 1298, which proves that he remained faithful to King Andrew III in that chaotic period. Pécs was taken and pillaged around 1300 by Eyza, the brother of the monarch's one-time opponent, Mizse.

Bishop Paul joined the party of Charles, the Neapolitan claimant to the throne of Hungary against the Czech Wenceslaus after the death of King Andrew III in 1301. His choice was in line with the policy adopted by the Holy See in the conflict for the Holy Crown of Hungary. Paul participated at the synod of the Hungarian prelates convoked by the papal legate, Cardinal Nicholas Boccasini. Additionally, he often advised the papal legate on legal issues concerning customary law in the Kingdom of Hungary. He also took part in the unsuccessful siege of Buda in September 1302 by Charles of Naples.

Paul seems to have been the bishop of Pécs who set up the bishop's chapel consisting of the clerics directly serving him. He appointed the provost of Pécs to the head of this new diocesan body, suggesting that he maintained a good relationship with the cathedral chapter at his see. He organized for the first time a procession in Pécs against tempest and thunderbolt on the day following the Feast of Corpus Christi. Bishop Paul was last mentioned in August 1304, but he died in the first half of 1306 according to the records on his successor's election.

Paul Balog (bishop of Pécs) Born: c. 1250 Died: 1306
Catholic Church titles
Preceded by Favus	Provost of Veszprém; 1273–1286	Succeeded by Andronicus
Preceded by Job	Bishop of Pécs; 1293–1306	Succeeded by Manfred
