= Peter I of Pécs =

Hungarian prelate

Peter I was a Hungarian prelate, who served as bishop of Pécs between 1306 and 1314. He was appointed bishop by Archbishop Thomas of Esztergom at the end of 1306 after the canons of the cathedral chapter of Pécs did not reach a consensus on the succession of the elected bishop Manfred who had died at the beginning of the year.

== History ==
Peter had two brothers, Andronicus, the Provost of Veszprém and comes Thomas. The three brothers were granted portions in Maros (with its church dedicated to Catherine of Alexandria) and Szanás in Veszprém County (near present-day Somogyszil, Somogy County) by King Andrew III of Hungary in 1296, 1297 and 1298, which lands were confiscated from Ambrose Szarvasdi, a familiaris of the rebellious Kőszegi family, who, in addition, died without descendants. Before his appointment as bishop, Peter was dean of Tolna County at least from 1295. He had also been vice-chancellor of Charles of Anjou. Bishop Peter was last mentioned in a royal charter of April 1, 1314.

Although Peter was consecrated bishop by May 1307, a group of canons in the cathedral chapter of his see did not accept his appointment. They were led by Nicholas, cantor of the chapter who allied himself with one of Charles of Anjou's opponents, Henry Kőszegi. The latter took the fortress at Pécs and handed it over to Cantor Nicholas who thus succeeded in prevent Bishop Peter from entering his see and collecting revenues from his bishopric. Although Archbishop Thomas and Bishop Peter excommunicated Cantor Nicholas, he did not give up his position in Pécs. Thereafter Bishop Peter mostly stayed in the retinue of the papal legate, Cardinal Gentile Portino da Montefiore. For instance, he took part in the negotiations between the most influential noblemen of the Kingdom of Hungary and the papal legate in November 1308, and also participated at the coronation of Charles of Anjou on June 15, 1309.

The papal legate confirmed the excommunication of Cantor Nicholas on September 29, 1309. At the same time, the parts of the diocese of Pécs north of the river Drava were put under interdict. The Cardinal's action seems to have been effective, because Bishop Peter could enter his see by the middle of 1310. He must have made a compromise with his opponent who preserved his cantorship in the cathedral chapter of Pécs until his death. Bishop Peter was last mentioned in a royal charter of April 1, 1314.

Peter I of Pécs Died: a. April 1, 1314
Catholic Church titles
Preceded by Manfred	Bishop of Pécs; 1306–1314	Succeeded by Ladislaus Kórógyi
