= Manfred of Pécs =

Manfred was the elected bishop of Pécs (Hungarian: Manfréd választott pécsi püspök) in 1306, but he died before his consecration. He was born before 1256. When the first record was made of him in 1277, Manfred was a canon at the cathedral chapter in Zagreb and dean of Gercse. He was promoted to the provostship of the cathedral chapter in 1292 at the latest. In his more than 29-year-long service in the Zagreb cathedral chapter, an important "place of authentication" in the Kingdom of Hungary, Manfred often witnessed the determination of borders between neighbouring properties or acted as mediator between noblemen in Slavonia. The members of the cathedral chapter of Pécs elected Manfred bishop on 23 February 1306, but he died in some months.

Manfred of Pécs Born: b. 1256 Died: 1306
Catholic Church titles
Preceded by Paul Balog	Bishop of Pécs (elected); 1306	Succeeded by Peter I
