= Boldogkőváralja =

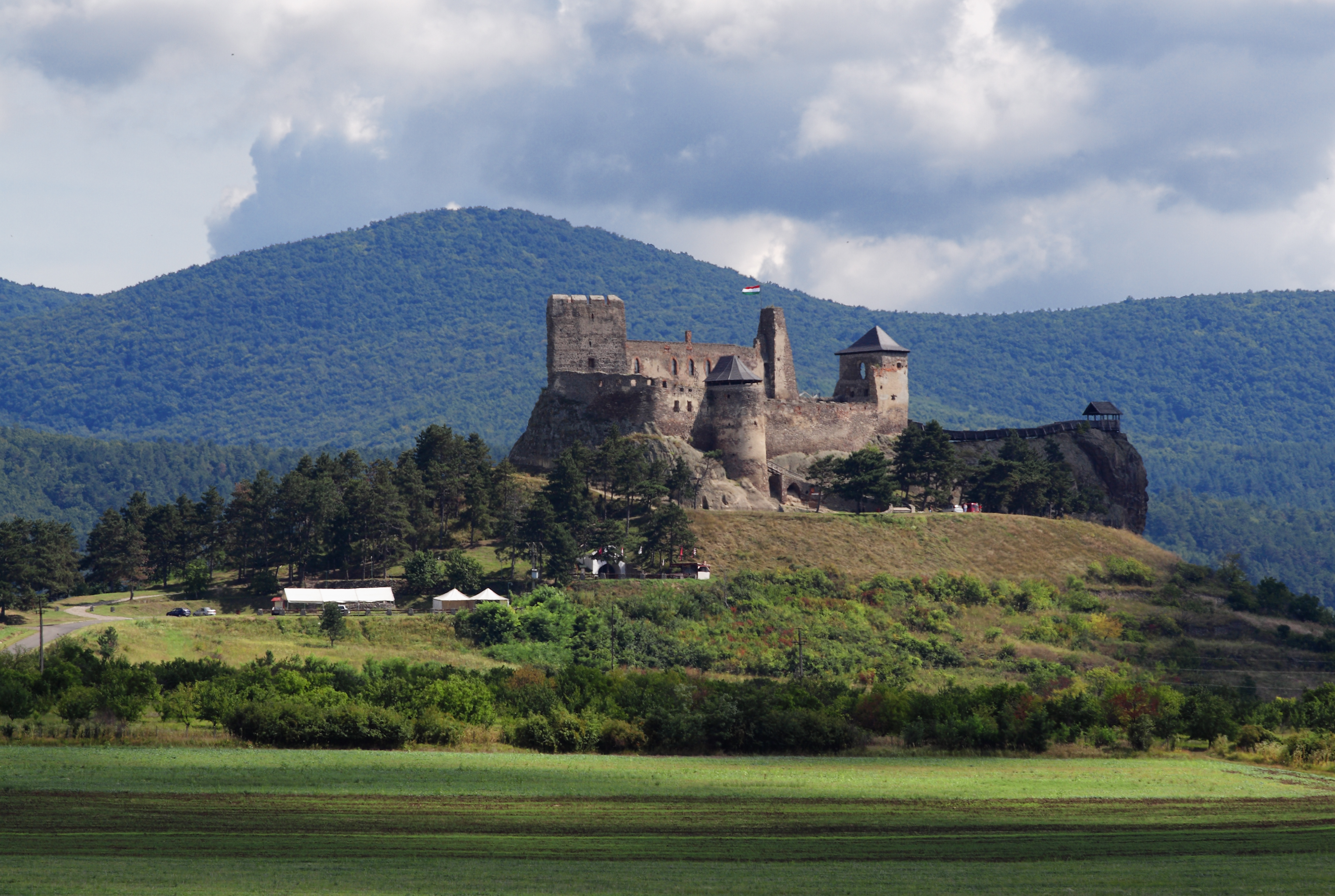
- Location of Borsod-Abaúj-Zemplén county in Hungary

- Coat of arms

- Location of Boldogkőváralja
- Coordinates: 48.33797°N 21.23580°E
- Country: Hungary
- County: Borsod-Abaúj-Zemplén

Area
  - Total: 21.99 km^{2} (8.49 sq mi)

Population (2004)
  - Total: 1,173
  - Density: 53.34/km^{2} (138.1/sq mi)
- Time zone: UTC+1 (CET)
  - Summer (DST): UTC+2 (CEST)
- Postal code: 3885
- Area code: 46

Boldogkőváralja is a village in Borsod-Abaúj-Zemplén county, Hungary. As per 2004 census, this municipality had 1,173 inhabitants.

== Personalities ==
- Jozef Vavrek (1898–1970) – Roman Catholic priest
