= Sokoľ =

Municipality of Slovakia

Sokoľ Hernádszokoly
- Municipality
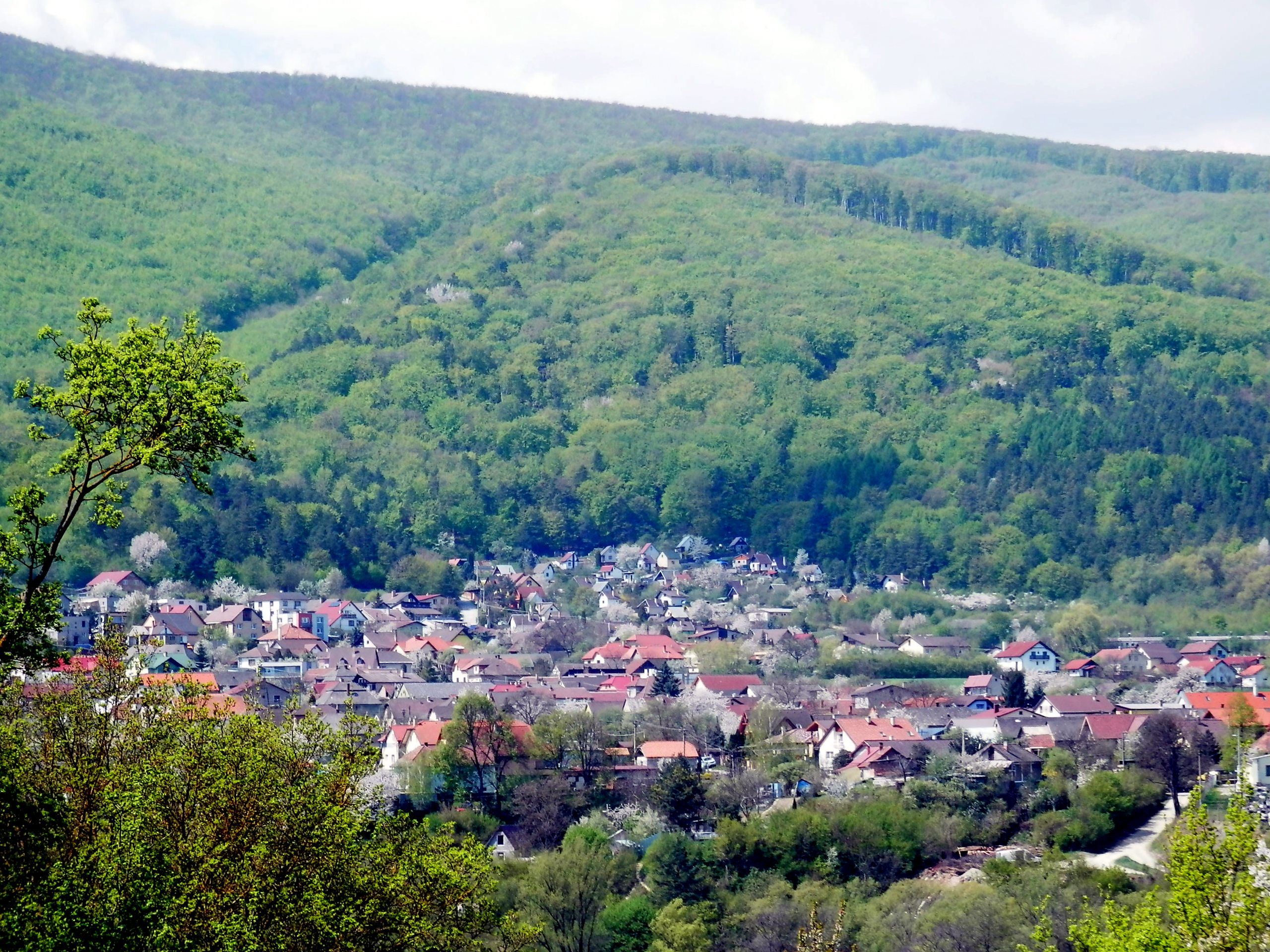

- Flag

- Location of Sokoľ in the Košice Region Location of Sokoľ in Slovakia
- Coordinates: 48.82°N 21.22°E
- Country: Slovakia
- Region: Košice Region
- District: Košice-okolie District
- First mentioned: 1270

Area
  - Total: 15.66 km^{2} (6.05 sq mi)
- Elevation: 279 m (915 ft)

Population (2025)
  - Total: 1,350
- Time zone: UTC+1 (CET)
  - Summer (DST): UTC+2 (CEST)
- Postal code: 443 1
- Area code: +421 55
- Vehicle registration plate (until 2022): KS
- Website: www.obecsokol.sk

Sokoľ (lit. 'Falcon'; Hungarian: Hernádszokoly) is a village and municipality in Košice-okolie District in the Kosice Region of eastern Slovakia.

== History ==
In historical records the village was first mentioned in 1270 (Zokola), when it belonged to master Reinhold. In the 13th century a castle existed in the hills near the village. It disappeared in 1430. the village passed to many landowners' families: in 1330 to Drugeth, in 1370 to Rozgonyi, in 1387 to Bebek and in 1423 to Palocsay. In 1429 it passed to Košice.

== Geography ==
The municipality lies at an altitude of 279 metres (915 ft) and covers an area of 15.66 km^{2} (6.05 sq mi) (2025).

== Population ==
Population statistic (10 years)
Year	1995	2005	2015	2025
Count	630	897	1150	1350
Difference		+42.38%	+28.20%	+17.39%

Population statistic
Year	2024	2025
Count	1335	1350
Difference		+1.12%

It has a population of 1350 people (31 December 2025).

=== Ethnicity ===
Census 2021 (1+ %)
Ethnicity	Number	Fraction
Slovak	1203	96.24%
Romani	161	12.88%
Not found out	29	2.32%
Hungarian	15	1.2%
Total	1250	

In year 2021 was 1250 people by ethnicity 1203 as Slovak, 161 as Romani, 29 as Not found out, 15 as Hungarian, 11 as Rusyn, 9 as Other, 7 as Czech and 1 as Greek.

Note on population: The difference values of population numbers in the table "Population statistic" and in the sections "Ethnicity" & "Religion" is caused by the use of various statistical methods.

=== Religion ===
Census 2021 (1+ %)
Religion	Number	Fraction
Roman Catholic Church	877	70.16%
None	221	17.68%
Greek Catholic Church	56	4.48%
Evangelical Church	29	2.32%
Not found out	26	2.08%
Calvinist Church	18	1.44%
Total	1250	

In year 2021 was 1250 people by religion 877 from Roman Catholic Church, 221 from None, 56 from Greek Catholic Church, 29 from Evangelical Church, 26 from Not found out, 18 from Calvinist Church, 5 from Christian Congregations in Slovakia, 5 from Other, 4 from Old Catholic Church, 4 from Eastern Orthodox Church, 1 from Jewish community, 1 from Other and not ascertained christian church, 1 from United Methodist Church, 1 from Church of Jesus Christ of Latter-day Saints and 1 from Ad hoc movements.
