= Nagyberény =

- Village
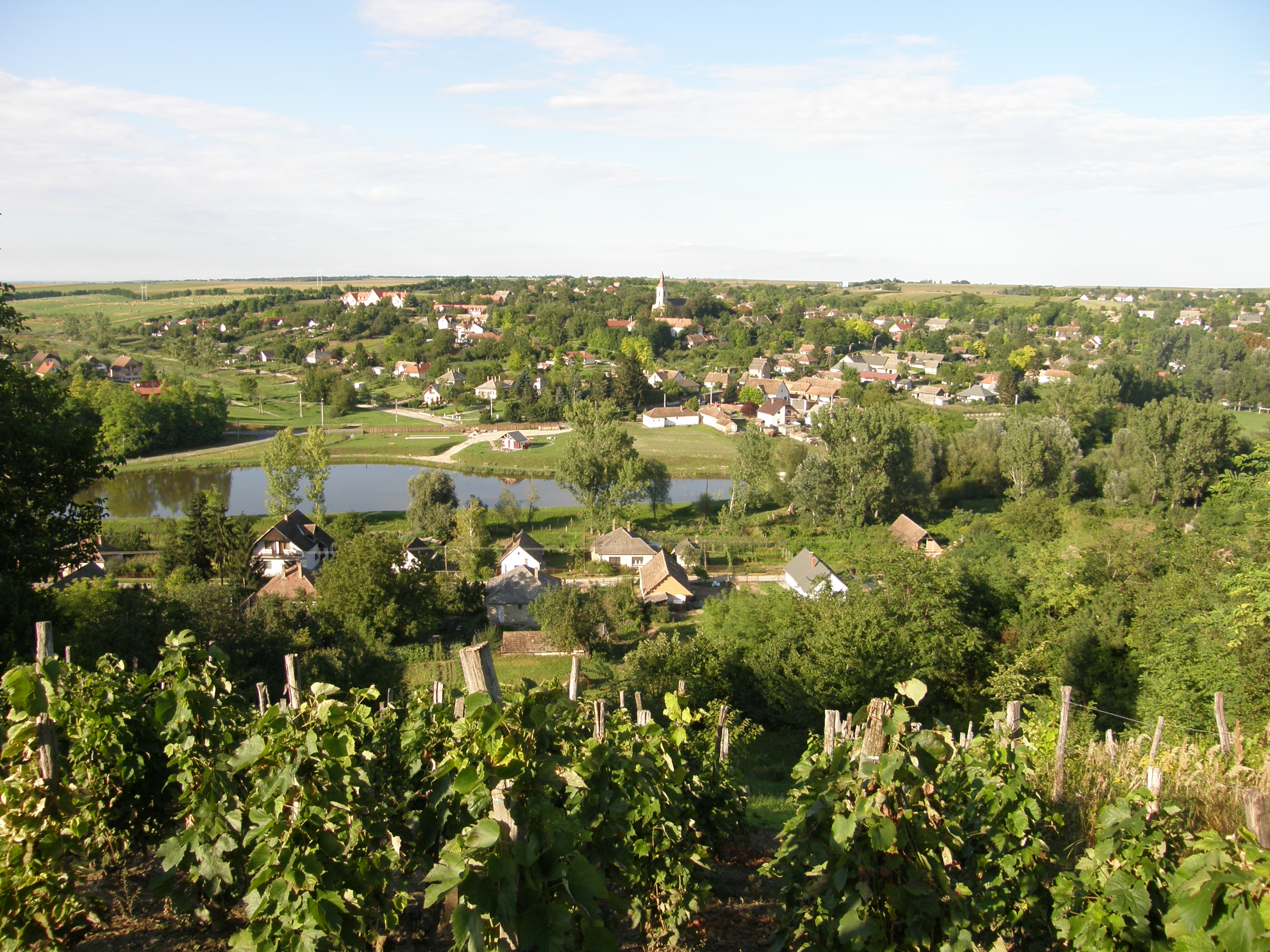
- Houses of Nagyberény

- Coat of arms

- Location of Nagyberény
- Coordinates: 46.79780°N 18.16841°E
- Country: Hungary
- Region: Southern Transdanubia
- County: Somogy
- District: Siófok
- RC Diocese: Kaposvár

Area
  - Total: 23.14 km^{2} (8.93 sq mi)

Population (2017)
  - Total: 1,295
  - Density: 55.96/km^{2} (144.9/sq mi)
- Demonym(s): berényi, nagyberényi
- Time zone: UTC+1 (CET)
  - Summer (DST): UTC+2 (CEST)
- Postal code: 8656
- Area code: (+36) 84
- NUTS 3 code: HU232
- MP: Mihály Witzmann (Fidesz)
- Website: Nagyberény Online

Nagyberény is a village in Somogy county, Hungary.

== History ==
According to László Szita the settlement was completely Hungarian in the 18th century.
