= Pölöske =

Coordinates: 46°45′N 16°56′E

- Village
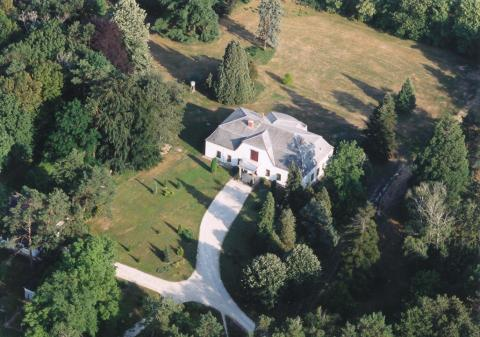
- Pölöske légifotó
- Interactive map of Pölöske
- Country: Hungary
- Region: Western Transdanubia
- County: Zala County
- Time zone: UTC+1 (CET)
  - Summer (DST): UTC+2 (CEST)

Pölöske is a village in Zala County, Hungary. It is famous for the "Pölöskei Szörp" syrup.
