= Dunaszekcső =

Dunaszekcső Seetschke
- Village
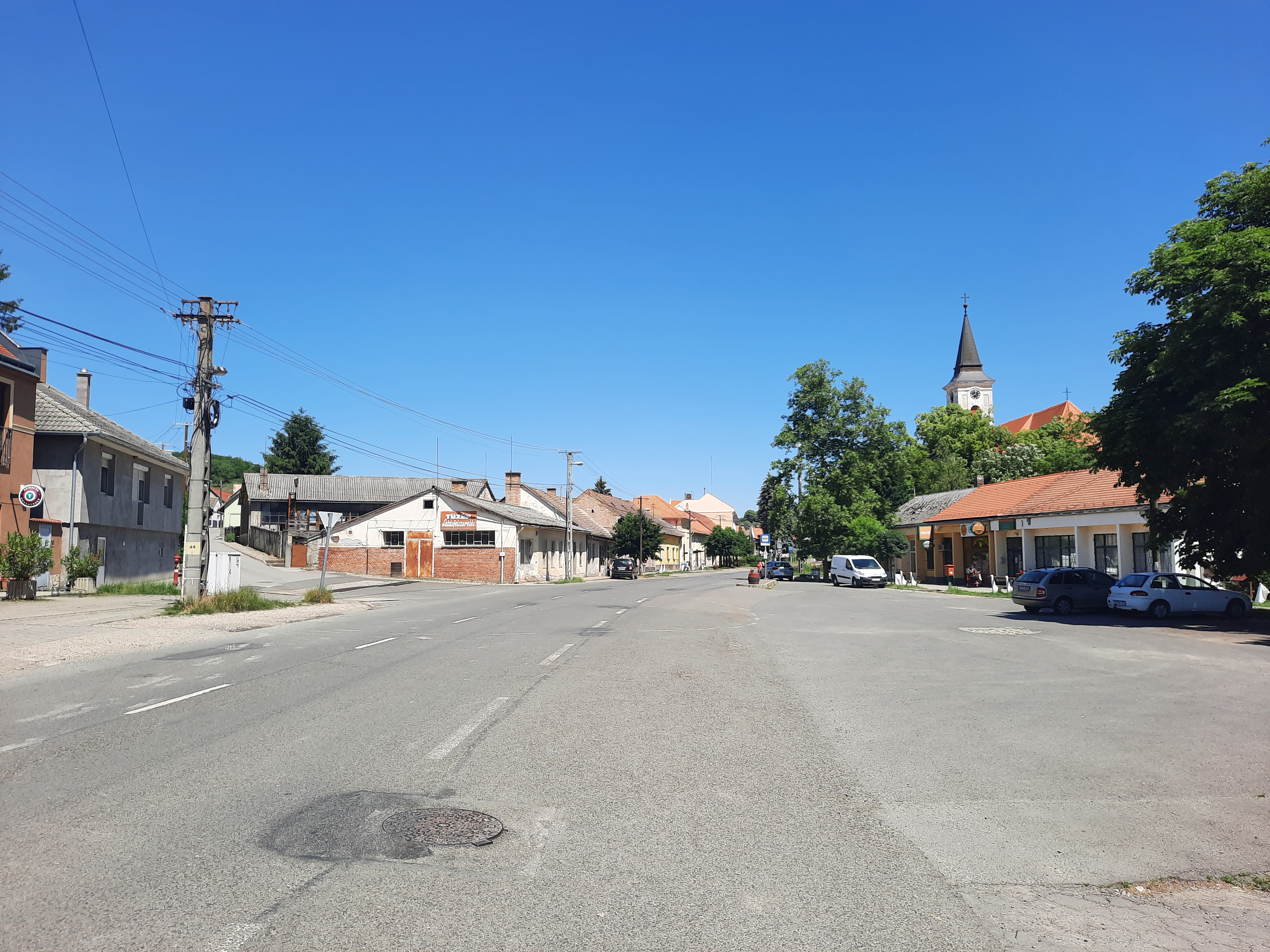
- Kossuth Lajos street with Roman Catholic Church

- Coat of arms
- Interactive map of Dunaszekcső
- Location of Dunaszekcső in Hungary
- Coordinates: 46°4′54.12″N 18°45′31.25″E
- Country: Hungary
- Region: Southern Transdanubia
- County: Baranya
- Subregion: Mohácsi
- Rank: Village

Area
  - Total: 36.76 km^{2} (14.19 sq mi)

Population (2015)
  - Total: 1,911
  - Density: 51.99/km^{2} (134.6/sq mi)
- Time zone: UTC+1 (CET)
  - Summer (DST): UTC+2 (CEST)
- Postal code: 7712
- Area code: +36 69
- Website: www.dunaszekcso.hu

Dunaszekcső (German: Seetschke, Seetsche; Latin: Florentina, Lugio; Serbo-Croatian: Sečuv, Sečuj, Sečuh) is a village in Baranya County, Hungary, situated on the right bank (west side) of the River Danube. The inhabitants are ethnic Hungarian, with minorities of Danube Swabians and Serbs. The population was about 1900 in 2015.

== History ==
The present village largely covers the site of the substantial Roman camp and settlement of Lugio.

In June 1700, Serbian Patriarch (in exile) Arsenije III held a church assembly in the town, which was known in Serbian as Sečuj. At that time, the village was one of the centers of Serbian church and political life. At the assembly, Danilo Šćepčević was officially chosen as the metropolitan of Montenegro (Cetinje).

== Demographics ==
As of 2022, the village is 87,4% Hungarian, 12.9% German, and 5% Gypsy. 47.9% of the population is Roman Catholic, and 5.1% is Reformed.

== Amenities ==
The village has an eight-grade primary school, a kindergarten, a cultural center, a library and an old people's day-care center. Medical services are provided by two physicians, a nurse, and a dentist.

The village lies on the main road No. 56. It has regular long-distance and local bus services.

The Dunaszekcső Loess Slope is a nature protection area forming part of the Danube–Drava National Park.
