= Szabolcs County =

County of the Kingdom of Hungary

Szabolcs County Comitatus Szabolcsensis (Latin) Szabolcs vármegye (Hungarian) Komitat Saboltsch (German)
- County of the Kingdom of Hungary (11th century-1526); County of the Eastern Hungarian Kingdom (1526-1570); County of the Kingdom of Hungary (1570-1621); County of the Principality of Transylvania (1621-1629); County of the Kingdom of Hungary (1629-1645); County of the Principality of Transylvania (1645-1648); County of the Kingdom of Hungary (1648-1923, 1938-1946); County of the Second Hungarian Republic (1946-1949); County of the Hungarian People's Republic (1949-1950)
- Coat of arms

- Capital: Nyíregyháza
- Area
  - Coordinates: 47°57′N 21°43′E
  - 1910: 4,637 km^{2} (1,790 sq mi)
- Population
  - 1910: 319,818
- History
  - Established: 11th century
  - Treaty of Trianon: 4 June 1920
  - Merged into Szabolcs-Ung County: 1923
  - County recreated (First Vienna Award): 2 November 1938
  - Disestablished: 16 March 1950
- Today part of: Hungary (4,570 km^{2}); Ukraine (69 km^{2})

Szabolcs was an administrative county (comitatus) of the Kingdom of Hungary. Its territory is now part of Hungary, except for three villages which are in the Zakarpattia Oblast of Ukraine. The capital of the county was Nyíregyháza.

== Geography ==
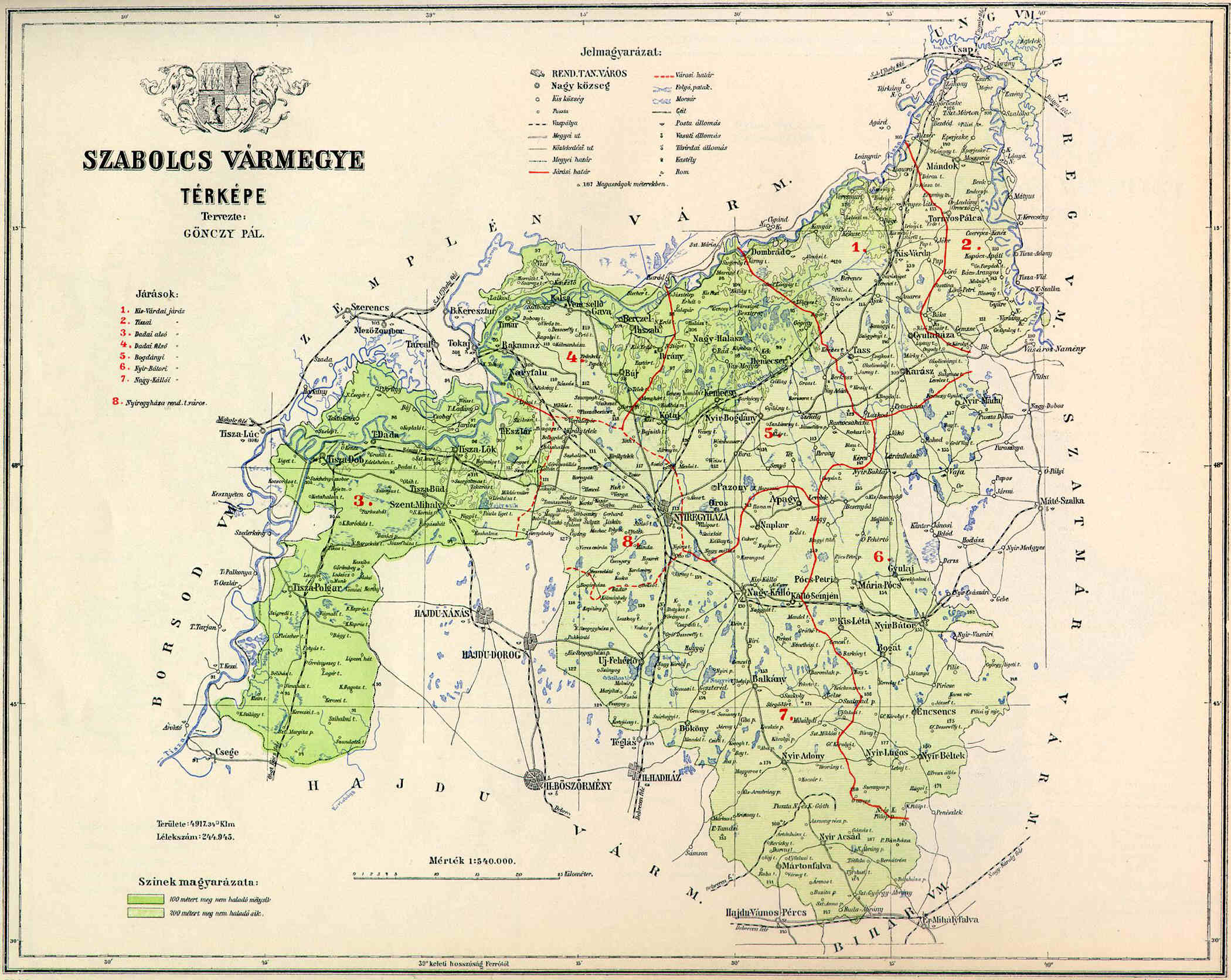
Map of Szabolcs, 1891.

In the late 19th and early 20th centuries Szabolcs county shared borders with the counties of Borsod, Zemplén, Ung, Bereg, Szatmár, Bihar and Hajdú. It was situated mostly south of the river Tisza. Its area was 4,637 km^{2} (1,790 sq mi) around 1910.

Prior to the Hungarian administrative reforms of 1876 Szabolcs controlled some additional territory to the south-west giving it borders with Heves and Külső-Szolnok and the Nagykunság (part of the Jászkunság from 1745), as well as a small section of border with Békés. This territory largely became part of Hajdú when it was established in 1876. The Hajdúkerület ('Hajdú district', not to be confused with the later Hajdú county) existed mostly as an enclave of Szabolcs, with some exclaves lying between Szabolcs and Bihar.

In the 1850 reforms which followed the revolutions of 1848 the Hajdú district was attached to Szabolcs. In the reforms of 1854 Szabolcs lost its western territory, including the Hajdúkerület and the later Dada alsó district (the salient along the Tisza) to the newly-established North Bihar county. The traditional counties of Hungary were restored in 1860, reversing these changes.

== History ==
Szabolcs is one of the oldest counties of the Kingdom of Hungary. In the 17th century, the towns of Hajdú separated from the county, creating the Hajdú district. The capital of Szabolcs County was initially Szabolcs (now a village), later Nagykálló took over this role (1747-1867), and since 1867 the capital was moved to Nyíregyháza.

In the 18th and early 19th century Szabolcs was part of the Circulus/Districtus Trans-Tibiscanus ('circle/district beyond the Tisza'), one of four such districts within the Kingdom of Hungary.

From 1850 to 1860 Szabolcs was part of the Military District of Großwardein.

After World War I, it was merged with a very small part of the former Ung County to form Szabolcs-Ung county, with Nyíregyháza as the capital. However, the villages of Eszeny (present-day Esen), Szalóka (present-day Solovka) and Tiszaágtelek (present-day Tisaahtelek) in the Tisza district were passed to Czechoslovakia. These villages were returned to Hungary between 1938 and 1945, but were passed to the Soviet Union afterwards (they are part of Ukraine since 1991). In 1950, the county was disestablished and Szabolcs-Szatmár County was created, which included most of its territory, while some parts of it were passed to the newly created Borsod-Abaúj-Zemplén and Hajdú-Bihar counties (area around Polgár and north-east of Debrecen). In 1990, Szabolcs-Szatmár County was renamed to Szabolcs-Szatmár-Bereg County.

== Demographics ==
Nyíregyháza, the capital of Szabolcs County, was founded around 1750 as a Slovak Lutheran settlement, and had an ethnic Slovak majority until the latter part of the 19th century, when the population became Magyarized. Also, Szabolcs County had a sizeable population of Greek Catholics, who were of Ruthenian and Romanian origin and who became almost entirely Magyarized by the end of the 19th century.

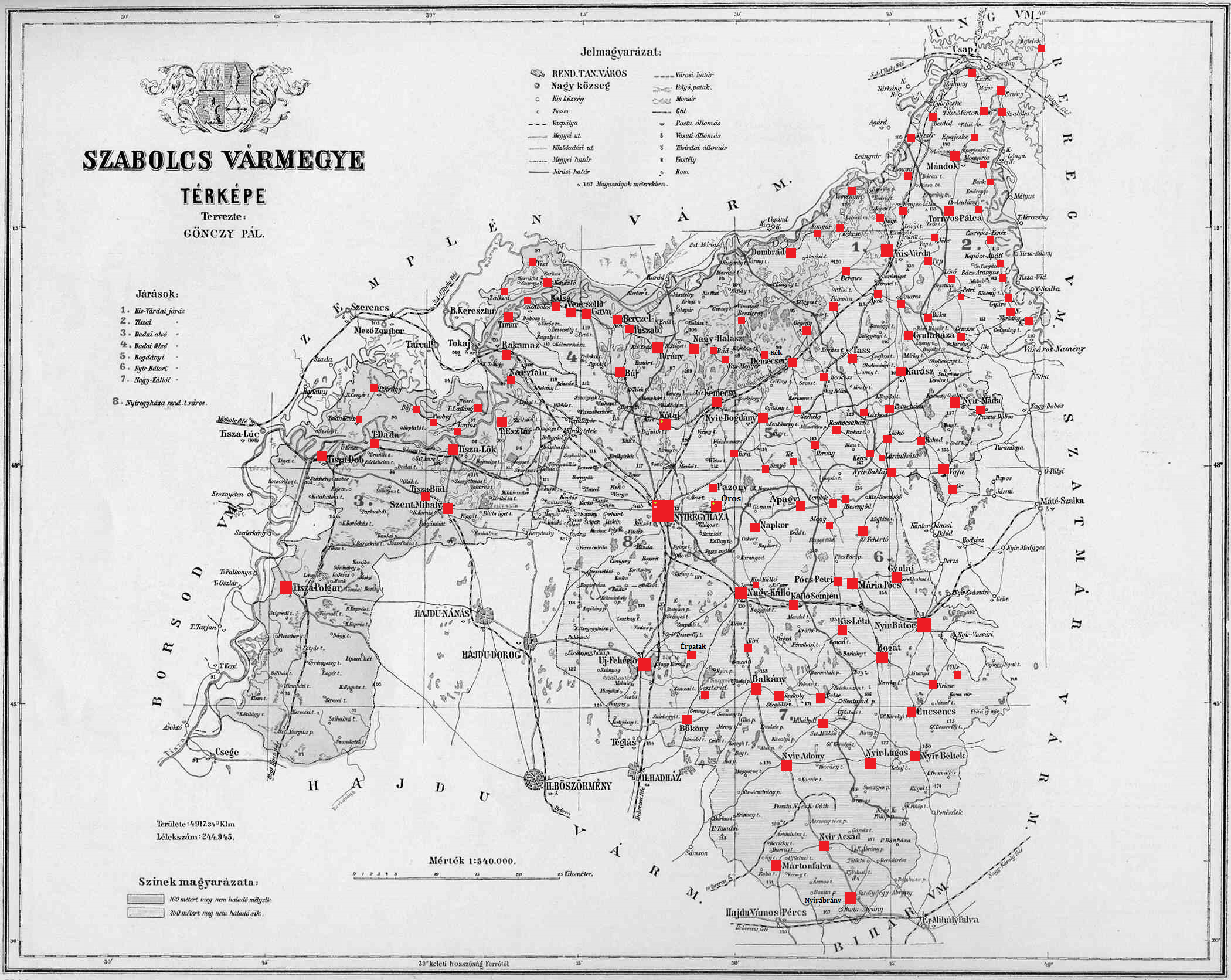
Ethnic map of the county with data of the 1910 census (see the key in the description).

Population by mother tongue (Note: Only linguistic communities > 1% are displayed.)
Census	Total	Hungarian	Slovak	Other or unknown
1880	214,008	186,529 (90.83%)	13,087 (6.37%)	5,740 (2.80%)
1890	244,945	234,920 (95.91%)	6,897 (2.82%)	3,128 (1.28%)
1900	288,672	285,023 (98.74%)	2,066 (0.72%)	1,583 (0.55%)
1910	319,818	316,765 (99.05%)	1,117 (0.35%)	1,936 (0.61%)

Population by religion (Note: Only religious communities > 1% are displayed.)
Census	Total	Calvinist	Roman Catholic	Greek Catholic	Jewish	Lutheran	Other or unknown
1880	214,008	84,674 (39.57%)	54,920 (25.66%)	39,829 (18.61%)	20,119 (9.40%)	14,055 (6.57%)	411 (0.19%)
1890	244,945	96,435 (39.37%)	65,119 (26.59%)	46,597 (19,02%)	21,178 (8.65%)	15,490 (6.32%)	126 (0.05%)
1900	288,672	110,942 (38.43%)	80,509 (27.89%)	56,515 (19.58%)	23,277 (8.06%)	17,239 (5.97%)	190 (0.07%)
1910	319,818	121,396 (37.96%)	90,560 (28.32%)	63,353 (19.81%)	25,316 (7.92%)	18,924 (5.92%)	269 (0.08%)

== Subdivisions ==
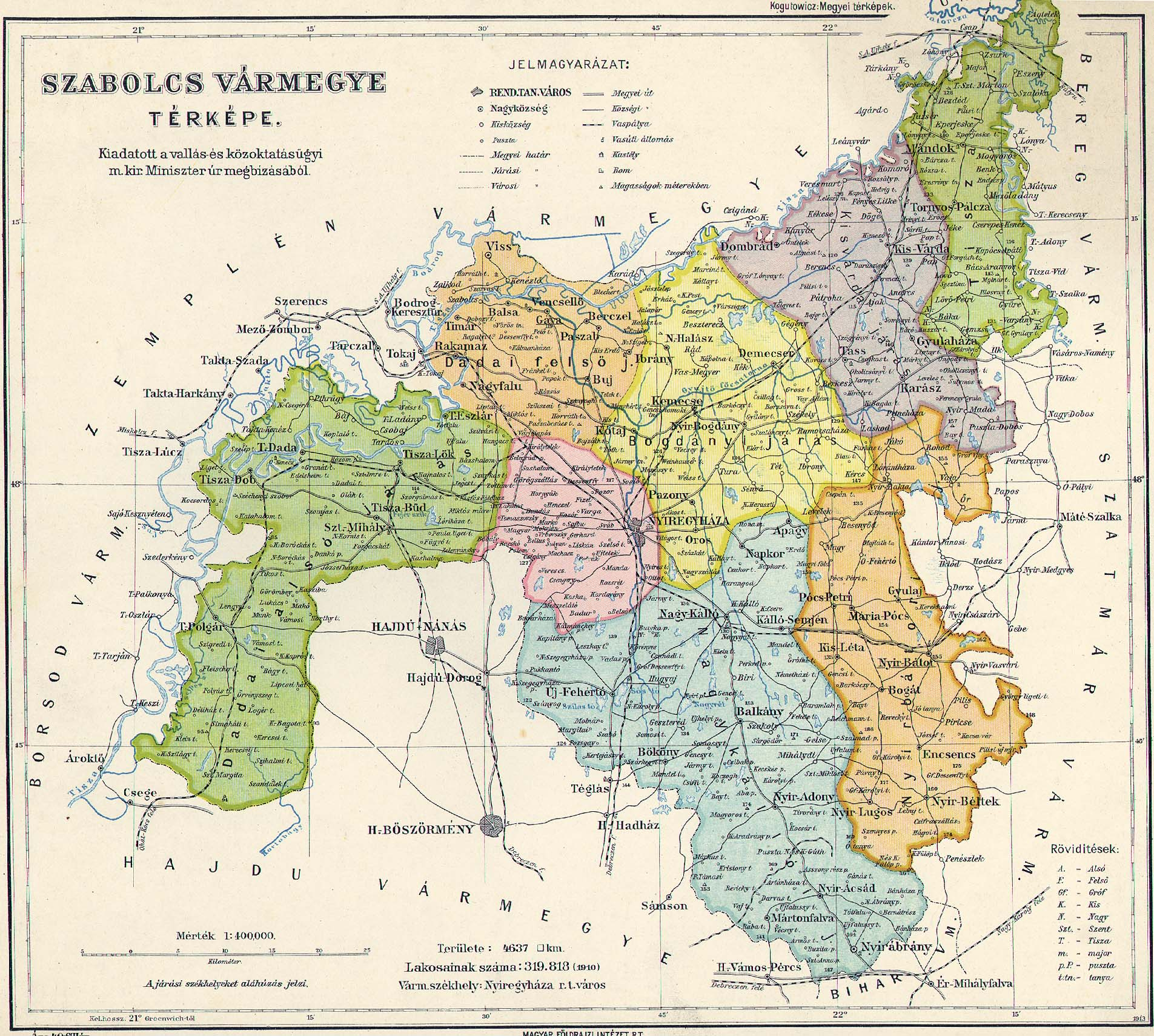

In the early 20th century, the subdivisions of Szabolcs county were:

Districts (járás)
District	Capital
Dada alsó	Tiszalök
Dada felső	Gáva
Kisvárda	Kisvárda
Ligetalja	Nyíracsád
Nagykálló	Nagykálló
Nyírbakta	Nyírbakta
Nyírbátor	Nyírbátor
Nyírbogdány	Kemecse
Tisza	Mándok
Urban districts (rendezett tanácsú város)
Nyíregyháza
