= Bihar County =

County of the Kingdom of Hungary

Bihar County Comitatus Bihariensis (Latin) Bihar vármegye (Hungarian) Komitat Bihar (German) Comitatul Bihor (Romanian)
- County of the Kingdom of Hungary (11th century–1526); County of the Eastern Hungarian Kingdom (1526–1570); County of the Principality of Transylvania (1570–1692); County of the Kingdom of Hungary (1692–1850, 1860–1946); County of the Second Hungarian Republic (1946–1949); County of the Hungarian People's Republic (1949–1950)
- Coat of arms

- Bihar County between 1876 and 1920
- Capital: Bihar; Nagyvárad (1083–1920, 1940–1945); Berettyóújfalu (1920–1940; 1945–1950)
- Area
  - Coordinates: 47°3′N 21°56′E
  - 1910: 10,657 km^{2} (4,115 sq mi)
  - 1930: 2,783 km^{2} (1,075 sq mi)
- Population
  - 1910: 646,301
  - 1930: 176,002
- History
  - Established: 11th century
  - Disestablished: 1850
  - County recreated: 20 October 1860
  - Treaty of Trianon: 4 June 1920
  - Second Vienna Award: 30 August 1940
  - Merged into Hajdú-Bihar County: 16 March 1950
- Today part of: Romania (7,874 km^{2}); Hungary (2,783 km^{2})
- Biharia; Oradea is the current name of the capital.

Bihar was an administrative county (comitatus) of the Kingdom of Hungary and a county of the Eastern Hungarian Kingdom and Principality of Transylvania (since the 16th century, when it was under the rule of the Princes of Transylvania). Most of its territory is now part of Romania, while a smaller western part belongs to Hungary. The capital of the county was Nagyvárad (now Oradea in Romania). Albrecht Dürer's father was from this county.

== Geography ==
Bihar County was situated along the upper courses of the rivers Körös, Sebes-Körös, Fekete-Körös, and Berettyó. The medieval county also included Kalotaszeg region (now Țara Călatei in Romania). The total territory of the medieval county was around 10,000 km^{2} (3,900 sq mi).

After 1876, Bihar county shared borders with the Hungarian counties Békés, Hajdú, Szabolcs, Szatmár, Szilágy, Kolozs, Torda-Aranyos and Arad. The western half of the county was in the Pannonian Plain, while the eastern half was part of the Apuseni Mountains (Erdélyi-középhegység). Its area was 10,657 km^{2} (4,115 sq mi) around 1910, making it the third largest county of Hungary.

== History ==
=== Origins ===
The origin of the name of Bihar is uncertain, however more theories exist. It could take its name from an ancient fortress in the current commune of Biharia. Or, the Hungarian Bihar derived from the word vihar (tempest, storm), that is of Slavic origin; vihor (whirlwind). A less probable theory is that Biharea is of Daco-Thracian etymology (bi meaning "two" and harati "take" or "lead"), possibly meaning two possessions of land in the Duchy of Menumorut.

In the 730s the Khazar Khaganate was ruled by Bihar Khagan, called Viharos in Armenian sources. “Viharos” is a currently used Hungarian word meaning stormy.

The castle of Byhor, or Bihar (now Biharia in Romania), was the center of the duchy of Menumorut at the time of the Hungarian conquest of the Carpathian Basin in the 890s, according to the Gesta Hungarorum. The Gesta—the only primary source which mentions Menumorut—describes him as a ruler "with Bulgarian heart" who was the vassal of the Byzantine Emperor. Menumorut's subjects were Khazars, and the Székelys joined the invading Hungarians in his duchy. Historian Tudor Sălăgean writes that other peoples (including Romanians) must have also lived in Menumorut's realm. Menumorut was forced to give his daughter in marriage to Zoltán, son of Árpád, Grand Prince of the Hungarians. When he died, his son-in-law inherited his duchy. Modern scholars debate whether Menumorut and his duchy actually existed or the anonymous author of the Gesta invented them. For instance, historian György Györffy says that Menumorut's name preserved the memory of the Moravians who dominated parts of the Carpathian Basin in the 9th century. According to historians György Györffy and Victor Spinei, the presence of Kabars in the region could have given rise to Anonymous' reference to Menumorut's "Khazars".

Place names of Slavic origin—for instance, Zomlyn (near modern Darvas in Hungary), Csatár and Szalacs (now Cetariu and Sălacea in Romania)—show that Slav communities lived along the rivers Ér and Berettyó and around Bihar. Graves of 10th-century warriors, buried together with parts of their horses, have been excavated, for instance, at Bihar, Hajdúböszörmény, and Nagyszalonta (now Salonta in Romania). According to archaeologist Thomas Nägler, the small number of graves which can be attributed to 10th-century Hungarian warriors shows that few Hungarians settled in the region after the Hungarian conquest. Archaeologist Erwin Gáll writes that the cemetery at Bihar may represent a "peripheral centre" of a core region which was located along the upper courses of the river Tisza, because the burial customs were similar in the two territories. Almost a dozen medieval villages—for instance, Felkér, Köröskisjenő and Köröstarján (now Felcheriu, Ineu, and Tărian in Romania)—bore the name of a Hungarian tribe, suggesting that Hungarian groups settled in the region in the late 10th and early 11th centuries, according to György Györffy.

Written sources and toponyms implies the presence of Székelys. The castle folk of Ebey—a village, located near Nagyszalonta, which was later abandoned—were grouped into a "hundred", or centurionatus, named Székelyszáz around 1217. The Seat of Telegd was most probably named after the village Telegd (now Tileagd in Romania). If this scholarly theory is valid, the ancestors of the Székelys of Telegd had lived in Bihar County before they moved to eastern Transylvania. Historian Florin Curta writes that the Székelys settled in the county only in the early 13th century.

Modern historians agree that the county was established between 1020 and 1050, most probably by Stephen I, the first king of Hungary, or possibly by his successor, Peter. According to a version of a royal charter, issued in 1203, mentioned that "the whole Bihar County" was located partly around Bihar and partly around Zaránd (now Zărand in Romania), suggesting that Bihar County had originally included Zaránd County, or at least its territories north of the river Fehér-Körös. Another version of the same charter also mentioned Békés besides Bihar and Zaránd, implying that Bihar County had also included the lands which developed into the separate Békés County.

=== Middle Ages ===
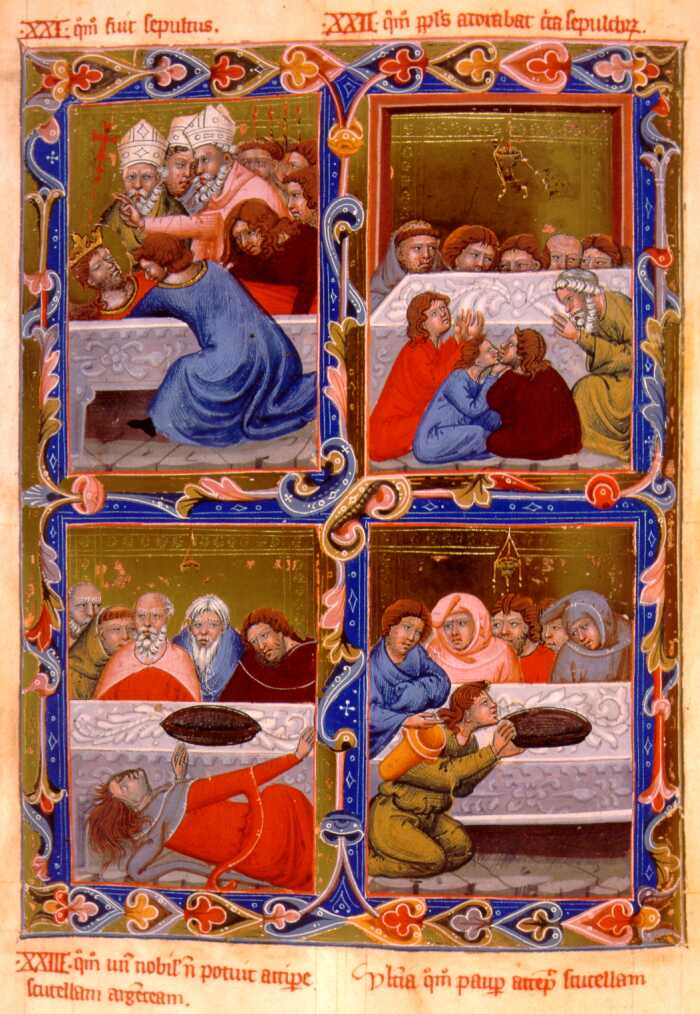
Anjou Legendarium: 1. The burial of King St Ladislaus in Várad Cathedral 2. People pray at his tomb 3. A rich man cannot lift a silver tray from his tomb 4. A poor man lifts the silver tray

The 11th-century Bihar Castle, made of earth and timber, was the first center of the county. The earliest royal charter that mentioned the ispán, or head, of the county was issued around 1067. The county was included in the ducatus, or duchy, that Andrew I of Hungary granted to his younger brother, Béla, around 1050. Béla's son, Géza, ruled the duchy from 1064. Nomadic Turks—Pechenegs or Ouzes—plundered the eastern territories of the Kingdom of Hungary, including the region around Bihar Castle in 1068. Duke Géza, his brother, Ladislaus, and their cousin, King Solomon of Hungary, joined their forces and chased the marauders as far as Doboka (now Dăbâca in Romania). Six years later, "the troops from Byhor" were under the command of Duke Ladislaus in the Battle of Mogyoród which ended with the decisive victory of Géza and Ladislaus over King Solomon. The first document that mentioned the county was issued in 1075.

According to György Györffy, the county seems to have originally been included in the Roman Catholic Diocese of Eger, because the Deanery of Zsomboly, located to the south of Bihar County, formed an exclave of the Eger bishopric during the Middle Ages. The separate Roman Catholic Diocese of Bihar was set up between 1020 and 1061. Its see was transferred to Várad (now Oradea in Romania) before 1095. There were four deaneries in the county; the Deanery of Bihar was the first to have been documented (in 1213). Pilgrims frequented the shrine of King St Ladislaus in the Várad Cathedral after his canonization in 1192 and trials by ordeal were also held there.

Emeric, King of Hungary approached Pope Innocent III, asking him to make "Latins" abbot of the Greek monasteries in the Kingdom of Hungary to restore discipline. In a letter, written on 16 May 1204, the pope ordered Simon, the Catholic Bishop of Várad to visit the "Greek" monasteries and to set up a separate diocese, directly subjected to the Holy See, for them. According to historian Ioan-Aurel Pop, those "Greek" monasteries actually belonged to the local Orthodox Romanians'. Pop also writes that the Orthodox bishopric "in the country of Knez Bela", mentioned in a letter that Pope Innocent wrote to the Archbishop of Kalocsa in 1205, was located north of Oradea.

At least 19 villages—including Köröskisjenő, Mezőgyán, and Mezősas in Bihar County, and Gyulavarsánd and Vadász (now Vărșand and Vânători) in Zaránd County—made up the honour of Bihar Castle in the early 13th century. The Várad Register—a codex which preserved the minutes of hundreds of ordeals held at the Várad Chapter between 1208 and 1235—provides information of the life of the commoners in the honour. The castle folk who were divided in "hundreds" provided well-specified services to the ispán. The Register mentioned the gatekeepers and the hunters of Bihar Castle. The Register also referred to "guest settlers" of foreign—Rus', German or "Latin"—origin. For instance, Walloon "guests" established Olaszi near Várad (now Olasig neighborhood in Oradea) before 1215.

The kings started to give away parcels of the royal domain already in the 11th century. Prelates and ecclesiastic institutions—including the bishops of Várad, the Dömös Chapter and the Garamszentbenedek Abbey—were the first beneficiaries. According to György Györffy, the noble Ákos, Borsa, Gutkeled, and Hont-Pázmány clans received their first estates in the county in the 11th century; the Geregyes, the Telegdis and most other lords only in the late 13th century. The western and southwestern lowlands were distributed among dozens of noble families, each holding only one village.

The Mongols captured and destroyed Várad during their invasion of Hungary in 1241, according to Roger of Torre Maggiore, who was archdeacon of the Várad Chapter at that time. At least 18% of the nearly 170 settlements documented in the county before 1241 disappeared during the Mongol invasion. Stephen V of Hungary exempted the peasants living in the estates of the bishop of Várad of royal taxation and granted the bishop the right to open mines in his estates in 1263 to promote the economic recovery of the bishopric. A silver mine was in short opened at the bishop's domains at Belényes (now Beiuș in Romania).

New fortresses were built during the decades following the withdrawal of the Mongols. Judge royal Paul Geregye erected Sólyomkő Castle at Élesd (now Aleșd in Romania); his sons held further 2 newly built fortresses in the 1270s. Their power was crushed during King Ladislaus the Cuman's reign; he granted their fortresses and domains to the Borsas. James Borsa, one of the semi-independent "oligarchs", was the actual ruler of Bihar, Kraszna, Szabolcs, Szatmár, and Szolnok counties in the early 14th century. After James Borsa's fall in the late 1310s, the noble Czibak, Debreceni, and Telegdi families became the wealthiest lay landowners in the county. The center of the Debrecenis' ancestral estates, Debrecen, developed into a market town.

One of the earliest references to the presence of Romanians in the county—the place name Olahteluk ("Vlachs' Plot")—was recorded in a non-authentic charter, dated to 1283. The first authentic document mentioning Romanians was issued in 1293. They lived in the region of the bishop's castle at Várasfenes (now Finiș in Romania). Next a charter of 1326 referred to the Romanian Voivode Neagul who "settled and lived" (considet and commoratur) in Nicholas Telegdi's estate at Káptalanhodos (now Hodiș in Romania). Historian Ioan Aurel Pop writes that the latter charter proves that Nicholas Telegdi's estate had originally owned by Voivode Neagul.

=== Modern times ===
Bihar County as a part Principality of Transylvania, 1606–1660

Bihar County (in the western part of the territory) as a part of the Principality of Transylvania during Gabriel Bethlen's rule

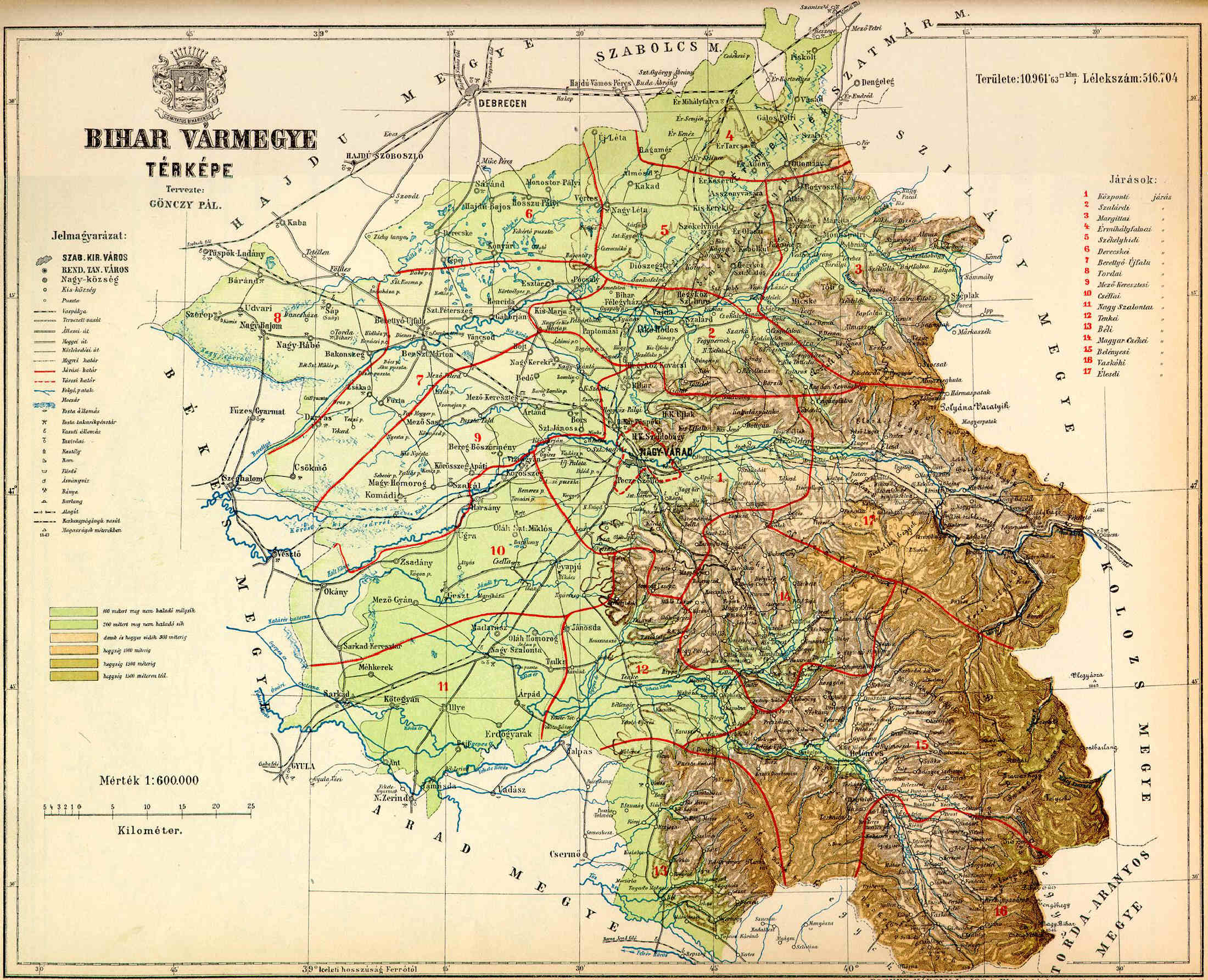
Contemporary map of Bihar county

Soon after the Battle of Mohács in 1526 the Kingdom of Hungary was partitioned; the county's territory became part of the Eastern Hungarian Kingdom, then from 1570 the Principality of Transylvania. A large part of it was ruled by the Ottoman Empire as Varat Eyalet between 1660–1692, before it became part of the Kingdom of Hungary again. Within Hungary Bihar was part of the Districtus/Circulus Trans-Tibiscanus ('district/circle beyond the Tisza'; German: District/Kreis jenseits der Theiß), one of four such districts; in the early 19th century this district also contained eleven other counties: Máramaros, Ugocsa, Szatmár, Szabolcs, Békés, Csongrád, Csanád, Arad, and the three Banat counties of Krassó, Temes, and Torontál.

Following the Hungarian Revolution of 1848, in 1850 Bihar was provisionally partitioned into Ober- and Unter-Bihar (Upper- and Lower-Bihar) as part of the District of Großwardein. These later became Süd- and Nord-Bihar (South- and North-Bihar). The border between Süd- and Nord-Bihar mostly followed the Berettyó/Barcău river. Süd-Bihar was centred on the Landbezirk of Großwardein (Hungarian: Nagyvárad, Romanian: Oradea) and also included the Stuhlbezirke (districts) of Ártánd, Élesd, Margita, Szalonta, Belényes and Tenke. Nord-Bihar was centred on the Land- and Stadtbezirk of Debreczin and also included the Stuhlbezirke of Dorogh, Diószegh, Derecske and Püspök-Ladány. Part of Nord-Bihar's territory had previously belonged to the Hajdúság (see Hajdú County) and Szabolcs County. The pre-1848 counties of Hungary, including Bihar, were restored in October 1860.

In 1876 the Kingdom of Hungary was divided into seven Circles, with a total of 64 counties. The Circle on the left bank of the Tisza contained eight counties, including Bihar, with the other seven being Békés, Hajdú, Máramaros, Szabolcs, Szatmár, Szilágy, and Ugocsa. At the same time various boundary changes occurred; Debrecen passed to the newly-established Hajdú County.

In 1920, by the Treaty of Trianon about 75% of the county became part of Romania. The west of the county remained in Hungary. The capital of this smaller county Bihar was Berettyóújfalu. In 1940, by the Second Vienna Award, the county's territory was extended by its former parts gained from Romania; in October 1944, during World War II, Romania regained control of that territory.

In 1950, the Hungarian county Bihar was merged with Hajdú County to form Hajdú-Bihar county. The southernmost part of Hungarian Bihar (the area around Sarkad and Okány) went to Békés County.

The Romanian part of former Bihar County now forms the Romanian Bihor County, except the southernmost part (around Beliu), which is in Arad County.

== Demographics ==
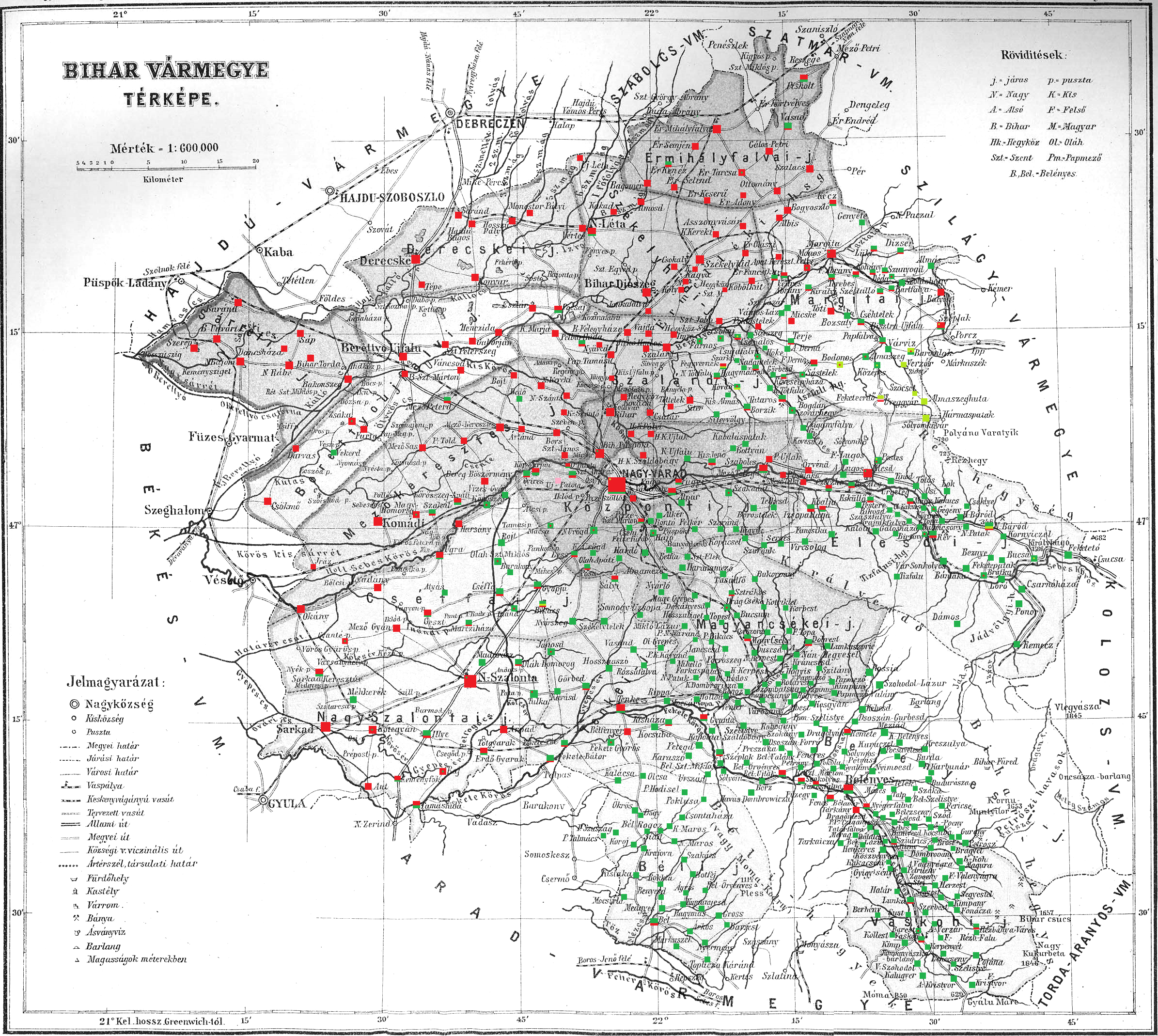
Ethnic map of the county with data of the 1910 census (see the key in the description).

Population by mother tongue (Note: Only linguistic communities > 1% are displayed.)
Census	Total	Hungarian	Romanian	Slovak	German	Other or unknown
1880	446,777	233,135 (54.02%)	186,264 (43.16%)	4,554 (1.06%)	4,305 (1.00%)	3,277 (0.76%)
1890	516,704	283,806 (54.93%)	219,940 (42.57%)	5,957 (1.15%)	3,374 (0.65%)	3,627 (0.70%)
1900	577,312	324,970 (56.29%)	239,449 (41.48%)	7,152 (1.24%)	3,620 (0.63%)	2,121 (0.37%)
1910	646,301	365,642 (56.57%)	265,098 (41.02%)	8,457 (1.31%)	3,599 (0.56%)	3,505 (0.54%)

Population by religion (Note: Only religious communities > 1% are displayed.)
Census	Total	Calvinist	Eastern Orthodox	Roman Catholic	Greek Catholic	Jewish	Other or unknown
1880	446,777	184,890 (41.38%)	163,531 (36.60%)	37,198 (8.33%)	38,158 (8.54%)	21,187 (4.74%)	1,813 (0.41%)
1890	516,704	209,075 (40.46%)	187,444 (36.28%)	45,864 (8.88%)	45,975 (8.90%)	25,968 (5.03%)	2,378 (0.46%)
1900	577,312	230,102 (39.86%)	205,474 (35.59%)	56,585 (9.80%)	52,222 (9.05%)	29,170 (5.05%)	3,759 (0.65%)
1910	646,301	249,613 (38.62%)	233,159 (36.08%)	68,019 (10.52%)	57,488 (8.89%)	32,462 (5.02%)	5,560 (0.86%)

== List of ispáns ==
=== Eleventh and twelfth centuries ===
Term	Incumbent	Monarch	Notes	Source
c. 1067	Stephen	Solomon	the county was part of the duchy of King Solomon's cousin, Géza	
c. 1111 – c. 1113	Saul	Coloman		
c. 1135	Bucan	Béla II	also judge royal; he is only mentioned in a non-authentic diploma	
c. 1138	Ákos	Béla II		
c. 1166	John	Stephen III		
c. 1181 – c. 1183	Esau	Béla	he was almost surely identical either with Palatine Esau or with Judge royal Esau both who held their offices between 1197 and 1198	
c. 1192 – c. 1193	Both	Béla		
c. 1197	Peter	Emeric	he may have been identical with Peter, son of Töre, who killed Queen Gertrude in 1213, according to historian Attila Zsoldos	
c. 1198 – c. 1199	Mika Ják	Emeric	also Master of the treasury (1198) and judge royal (1199)	
c. 1199	Nicholas	Emeric		

=== Thirteenth century ===
Term	Incumbent	Monarch	Notes	Source
c. 1200 – c. 1201	Mika Ják	Emeric	second rule; also palatine (1199)	
c. 1202 – c. 1203	Benedict	Emeric	also palatine (1202-1204)	
c. 1205 – c. 1206	Gyrco	Andrew II		
c. 1206 – c. 1207	Mog	Andrew II	also palatine (1206)	
c. 1207	Nicholas	Andrew II		
c. 1208	Marcellus Tétény	Andrew II		
c. 1208	Smaragd	Andrew II		
c. 1209	Michael Kacsics	Andrew II		
c. 1209	Nicholas	Andrew II	second rule	
1209 – 1212	Bánk Bár-Kalán	Andrew II	also count of the Queen's court	
1212 – 1216	Mika	Andrew II		
1216 – 1217	Neuka	Andrew II		
1219 – 1221	Mika	Andrew II	second rule	
1222	Buzád Hahót	Andrew II		
1222	Elias	Andrew II		
1222	Julius Rátót	Andrew II		
1223 – 1224	Pós	Andrew II	Mór Wertner identified him with Pousa Bár-Kalán	
1224	Theodore Csanád	Andrew II		
1226	Mika	Andrew II		
1228	Nicholas Csák	Andrew II		
1229 – 1230	Mojs	Andrew II	also palatine (1228-1231)	
1233 – 1235	Stephen	Andrew II	also master of the cupbearers (1235)	
1236	Denis Tomaj	Béla IV		
1236 – 1238	Lawrence	Béla IV		
1240	Dominic Rátót	Béla IV	master of the treasury	
1264	Mojs, son of Mojs	Béla IV	also ispán of Somogy County	
1272	Lawrence, son of Lawrence	Stephen V		
1291	Benedict	Andrew III	also bishop of Várad (1287-1296)	
c. 1299	Paul Balogsemjén	Andrew III	also ispán of Kraszna and Szatmár Counties	

=== Fourteenth century ===
Term	Incumbent	Monarch	Notes	Source
1302 – 1316	Beke Borsa		also ispán of Szabolcs and Békés Counties	
1317 – 1318	Dózsa Debreceni	Charles I	also ispán of Szabolcs County	

== Districts ==
In the early 19th century Bihar County was divided into five processus: Processus Váradiensis (east), Processus Sár-Rétiensis (north west), Processus Szalontensis (south west), Processus Ér-mellyékensis (north east) and Processus Belényesiensis (south east).

In the early 20th century, the districts (járás) and their capitals were:

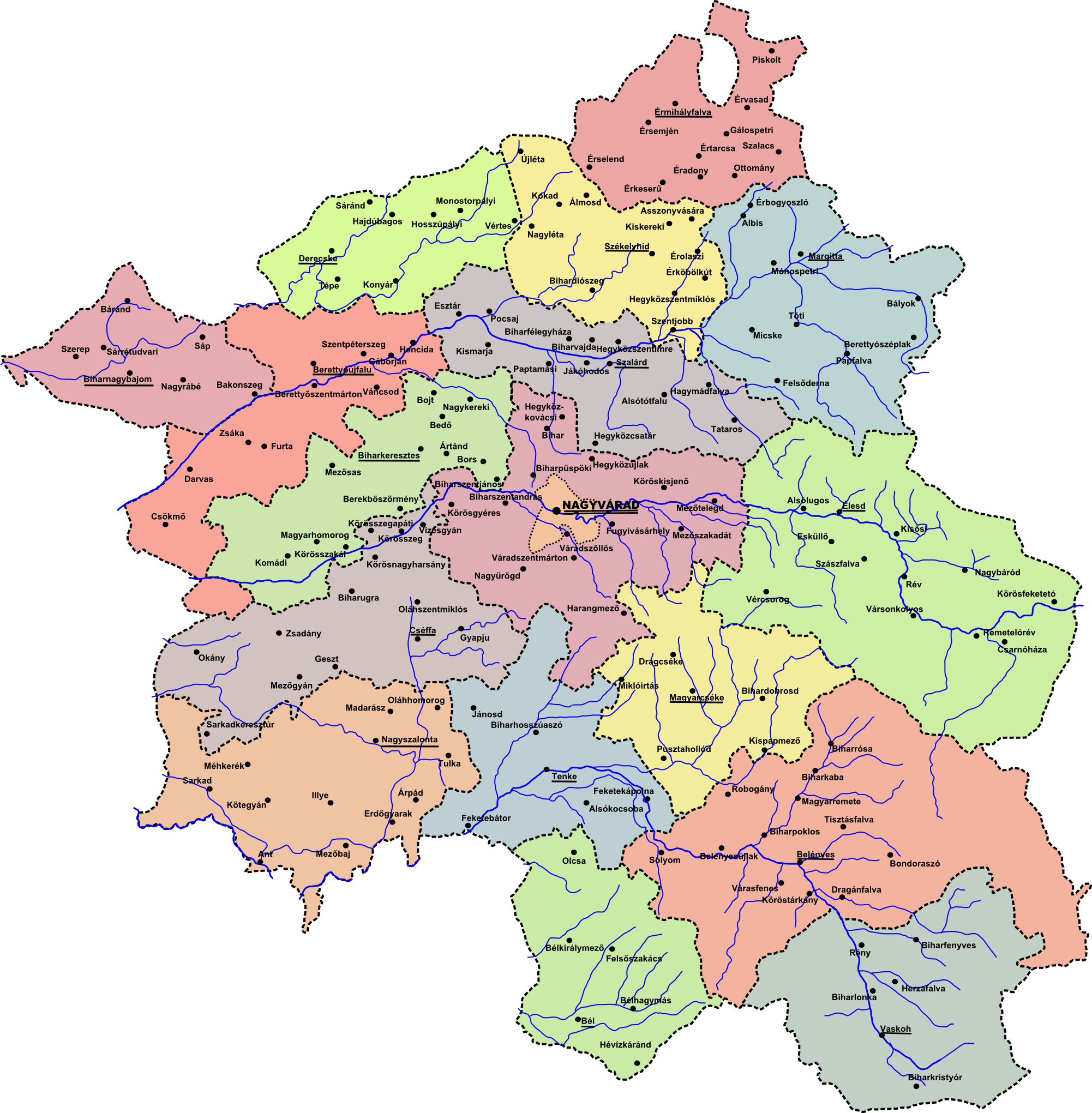
Bihar County

Districts (járás)
District	Capital
Bél	Bél, RO Beliu
Belényes	Belényes, RO Beiuș
Berettyóújfalu	Berettyóújfalu
Biharkeresztes	Biharkeresztes
Cséffa	Cséffa, RO Cefa
Derecske	Derecske
Élesd	Élesd, RO Aleșd
Érmihályfalva	Érmihályfalva, RO Valea lui Mihai
Központ	Nagyvárad, RO Oradea
Magyarcséke	Magyarcséke, RO Ceica
Margitta	Margitta, RO Marghita
Nagyszalonta	Nagyszalonta, RO Salonta
Sárrét	Biharnagybajom
Szalárd	Szalárd, RO Sălard
Székelyhid	Székelyhid, RO Săcueni
Tenke	Tenke, RO Tinca
Vaskoh	Vaskoh, RO Vașcău
Urban counties (törvényhatósági jogú város)
Nagyvárad, RO Oradea

The towns of Derecske, Berettyóújfalu, Biharnagybajom, and Biharkeresztes are now in Hungary, while the other towns mentioned are in Romania.

== Sources ==
- Bóna, István (1994). "The Hungarian–Slav Period (895–1172)". In Köpeczi, Béla; Barta, Gábor; Bóna, István; Makkai, László; Szász, Zoltán; Borus, Judit (eds.). History of Transylvania. Akadémiai Kiadó. pp. 109–177. ISBN 963-05-6703-2.
- Curta, Florin (2006). Southeastern Europe in the Middle Ages, 500-1250. Cambridge University Press. ISBN 978-0-521-89452-4.
- Engel, Pál (1996). Magyarország világi archontológiája, 1301–1457, I. [Secular Archontology of Hungary, 1301–1457, Volume I] (in Hungarian). História, MTA Történettudományi Intézete. ISBN 963-8312-44-0.
- Fallenbüchl, Zoltán (1994). Magyarország főispánjai, 1526–1848 [Lord-Lieutenants of Counties in Hungary, 1526–1848] (in Hungarian). Argumentum Kiadó. ISBN 963-7719-81-4.
- Gáll, Erwin (2013). Az Erdélyi-medence, a Partium és a Bánság 10-11. századi temetői [10th-11th-century Cemeteries from the Transylvanian Basin, the Partium and the Banat] (in Hungarian). Szegedi Tudományegyetem Régészeti Tanszéke, Magyar Nemzeti Múzeum, Magyar Tudományos Akadémia Bölcsészettudományi Kutatóközpont Régészeti Intézet. ISBN 978-963-306-197-8.
- Györffy, György (1987). Az Árpád-kori Magyarország történeti földrajza, I: Abaújvár, Arad, Árva, Bács, Baranya, Bars, Békés, Bereg, Beszterce, Bihar, Bodrog, Borsod, Brassó, Csanád és Csongrád megye [Historical Geography of Hungary of the Árpáds, Volume I: The Counties of Abaújvár, Arad, Árva, Bács, Baranya, Bars, Békés, Bereg, Beszterce, Bihar, Bodrog, Borsod, Brassó, Csanád and Csongrád] (in Hungarian). Akadémiai Kiadó. ISBN 963-05-4200-5.
- Kordé, Zoltán (1994). "Bihar". In Kristó, Gyula; Engel, Pál; Makk, Ferenc (eds.). Korai magyar történeti lexikon (9–14. század) [Encyclopedia of the Early Hungarian History (9th–14th centuries)] (in Hungarian). Akadémiai Kiadó. p. 103. ISBN 963-05-6722-9.
- Kristó, Gyula (1988). A vármegyék kialakulása Magyarországon [The Development of the Counties in Hungary] (in Hungarian). Magvető Kiadó. ISBN 963-14-1189-3.
- Kristó, Gyula (2003). Early Transylvania (895-1324). Lucidus Kiadó. ISBN 963-9465-12-7.
- Nägler, Thomas (2005). "Transylvania between 900 and 1300". In Pop, Ioan-Aurel; Nägler, Thomas (eds.). The History of Transylvania, Vol. I. (Until 1541). Romanian Cultural Institute (Center for Transylvanian Studies). pp. 198–231. ISBN 973-7784-00-6.
- Pop, Ioan-Aurel (2013). "De manibus Valachorum scismaticorum...": Romanians and Power in the Mediaeval Kingdom of Hungary: The Thirteenth and Fourteenth Centuries. Peter Lang Edition. ISBN 978-3-631-64866-7.
- Richard, Jean (1989). "The Establishment of the Latin Church in the Empire of Constantinople (1204–1227)". In Arbel, Benjamin; Hamilton, Bernard; Jacoby, David (eds.). Latins and Greek in the Eastern Mediterranean after 1204. Routledge. pp. 45–62. ISBN 0-7146-3372-0.
- Sălăgean, Tudor (2005). "Romanian Society in the Early Middle Ages (9th–14th Centuries AD)". In Pop, Ioan-Aurel; Bolovan, Ioan (eds.). History of Romania: Compendium. Romanian Cultural Institute (Center for Transylvanian Studies). pp. 133–207. ISBN 978-973-7784-12-4.
- Spinei, Victor (2003). The Great Migrations in the East and South East of Europe from the Ninth to the Thirteenth Century (Translated by Dana Bădulescu). Romanian Cultural Institute. ISBN 973-85894-5-2.
- Zsoldos, Attila (2011). Magyarország világi archontológiája, 1000–1301. [Secular Archontology of Hungary, 1000–1301] (in Hungarian). História, MTA Történettudományi Intézete. ISBN 978-963-9627-38-3.
