= Arad County (former) =

County of the Kingdom of Hungary

Arad County Comitatus Aradiensis (Latin) Arad vármegye (Hungarian) Komitat Arad (German) Comitatul Arad (Romanian)
- County of the Kingdom of Hungary (~1200-1526); County of the Eastern Hungarian Kingdom (1526–1552); County of the Kingdom of Hungary (1741–1923)
- Coat of arms

- Capital: Arad; Elek (1920–1923)
- Area
  - Coordinates: 46°11′N 21°19′E
  - 1910: 6,048 km^{2} (2,335 sq mi)
  - 1920: 270 km^{2} (100 sq mi)
- Population
  - 1910: 414,388
  - 1920: 21,720
- History
  - Established: 11th century
  - Ottoman conquest: 1552
  - County recreated: 1741
  - Treaty of Trianon: 4 June 1920
  - Merged into Csanád-Arad-Torontál County: 1923
- Today part of: Romania (5,778 km^{2}); Hungary (270 km^{2})

Arad County was an administrative unit in the Kingdom of Hungary, the Eastern Hungarian Kingdom and the Principality of Transylvania. The county was established along the Maros (Mureș) River in the 11th or the 12th century, but its first head, or ispán, was only mentioned in 1214. Its territory is now part of Romania, except a small area (the town of Elek and the surrounding villages) which is part of Hungary. The capital of the county was Arad.

== Geography ==
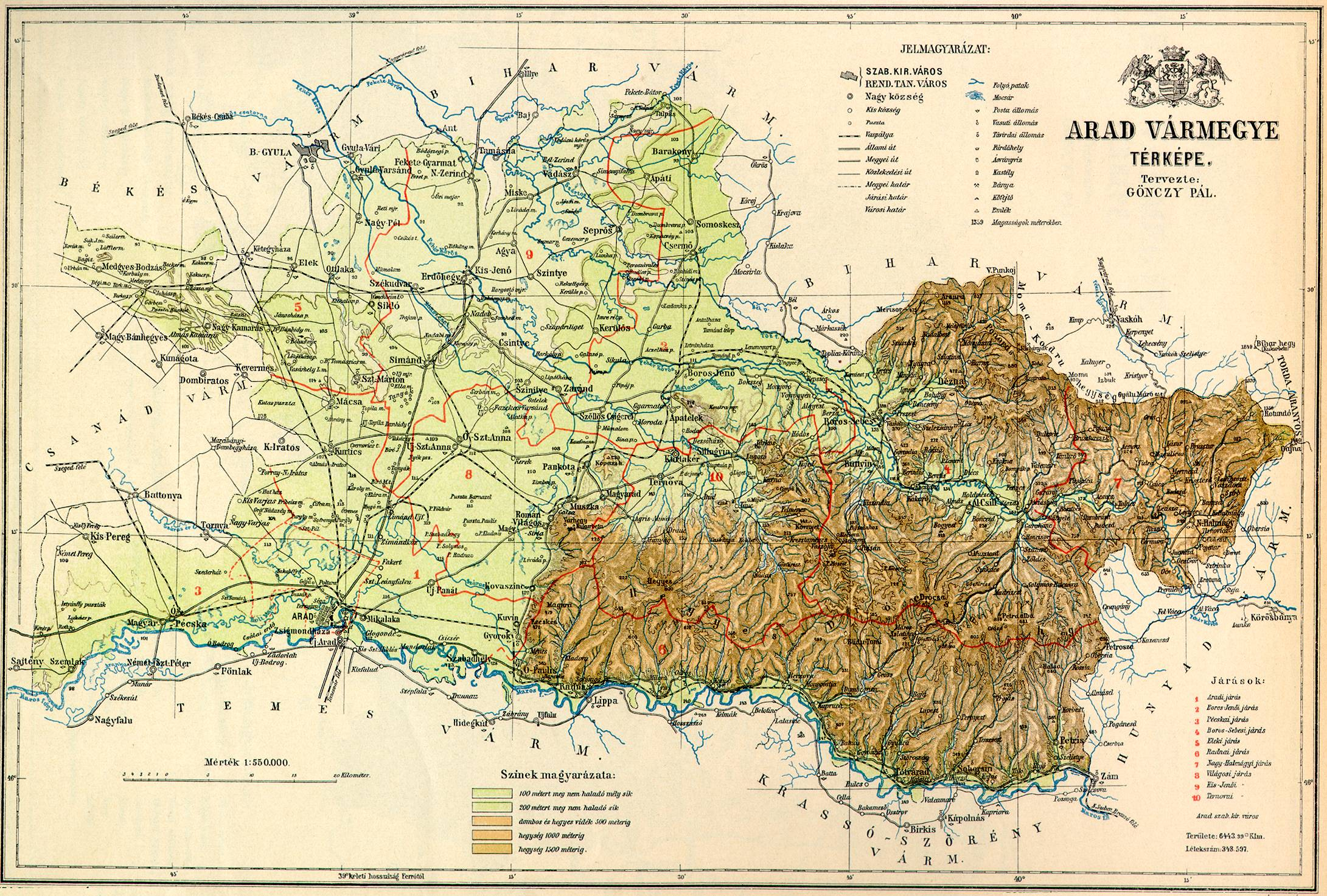
Map of Arad, 1891.

The medieval Arad County was situated in the lands along both banks of the Maros (Mureș) River. The existence of arable lands, pastures, vineyards and orchards in the western lowlands in the Middle Ages is well-documented. The hilly eastern regions were sparsely populated. The total territory of the medieval county was around 3,800 km^{2} (1,500 sq mi).

In 1744, Arad County absorbed a large part of Zaránd County, including its capital Zaránd/Zărand (the remainder of Zaránd County was then reorganized, with Körösbánya/Baia de Criș as the new capital). In 1876, when the administrative structure of the Kingdom of Hungary was changed, the territory of Arad County was further modified to include the western third of the diminished Zaránd County, namely the Nagyhalmágy/Hălmagiu district (Zaránd County was disbanded altogether on that occasion).

Arad County shared borders with the Hungarian counties of Csanád, Békés, Bihar, Torda-Aranyos, Hunyad, Krassó-Szörény, Temes, and Torontál. The river Mureș formed its southern border. Crișul Alb River flowed through the county. Its area was 6,078 km^{2} (2,347 sq mi) around 1910.

== History ==
=== Origins ===
The Hungarians dominated the region of the Maros in the middle of the 10th century, according to the Byzantine Emperor Constantine Porphyrogenitus. Archaeological finds also shows that Hungarians settled in the plains along the river after their arrival in the Carpathian Basin at the end of the 9th century. Place names of Slavic origin, including Lipova (Lippa) and Zăbrani (Temeshidegkút), evidence the presence of Slavic speaking communities, especially in the region where the river, coming from the mountains, reached the lowlands.

A powerful chieftain, Ajtony, ruled the territory along the rivers Danube, Maros and Tisza in the early 11th century. The Maros formed the northern border of Ajtony's realm, according to the Gesta Hungarorum, but the longer version of the Legend of Saint Gerard wrote that he controlled the lands as far as the Körös River. Ajtony was killed in a battle against the army of Stephen I of Hungary, which was under the command of Csanád. According to a scholarly theory, first proposed by historian György Györffy, Stephen I established Arad County after Ajtony's fall. On the other hand, historian Gyula Kristó writes that Ajtony's whole realm was transformed into the large Csanád County during Stephen I's reign; Arad County only developed into a separate administrative unit in the second half of the 11th century or in the 12th century.

=== Middle Ages ===
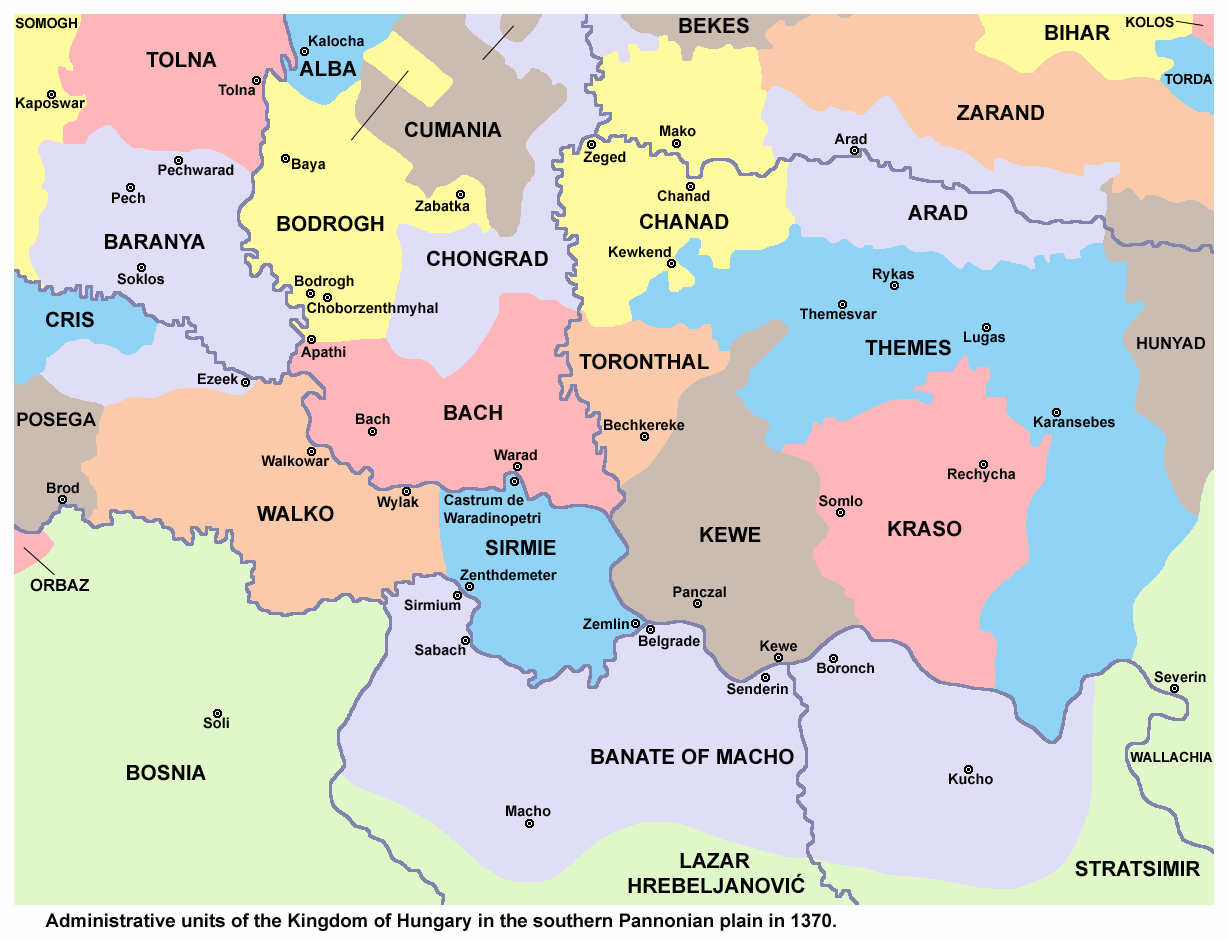
Arad County in the 14th century

The remains of an 11th-century stronghold, made of earth and timber, were found at Arad. At an assembly held in Arad in 1131, the wife of King Béla the Blind, Helena of Rascia, ordered the massacre of 68 Hungarian lords. Arad Castle and the estates attached to it were first documented in a royal charter, issued in 1177. The first known ispán, or head, of Arad County, Paul Csanád, was mentioned in a royal diploma, dated to 1214, but its authenticity is suspect. The earliest authentic document that referred to an ispán of Arad was issued in 1240. The western regions of the county were included in the Deanery of Arad of the Roman Catholic Diocese of Csanád; the Archdean of Arad was first mentioned in 1288.

The earliest documents suggest that the kings owned most lands in the plains along the Maros. However, the distribution of royal domains started at the end of the 11th century. For instance, Ladislaus I of Hungary and his brother, Lampert, granted five villages to the Titel Chapter before 1095 and Béla the Blind established the Arad Chapter in the 1130s. The Hodos clan was the only local noble kindred in the county; they were the patrons of the Hodoș-Bodrog Monastery. Members of the Csanád, Csák and Dorozsma clans received estates in Arad County in the early 13th century.

The effects of the Mongol invasion of Hungary cannot exactly be determined, but at least four monasteries disappeared. Solymos Castle (in present-day Șoimoș in Lipova), the first fortress built by a nobleman in the county, was erected after the withdrawal of the Mongols. Ecclesiastic institutions, prelates and lay lords – including the bishop of Csanád, the Arad Chapter and the Garais, Lackfis and Telegdis – held most former royal estates in the first half of the 14th century. The existence of four elected "judges of the nobles" was first documented in 1311, proving that Arad County had transformed into a "noble county", an institution of the local noblemen's self-government.

Lippa (present-day Lipova) became the most prosperous settlement in the early 14th century: the tax payable by the local priest to the Holy See between 1333 and 1335 (266 dinars) was almost ten times higher than the average tax collected in other parishes. The Slavs of the district of Lipova were converted into Catholicism in the middle of the century, according to John of Küküllő's contemporaneous chronicle. The earliest Romanian place name in the county – Caprewar (now Căprioara) – was recorded in a list of the estates of the Telegdis which was completed in 1337.

=== Modern times ===
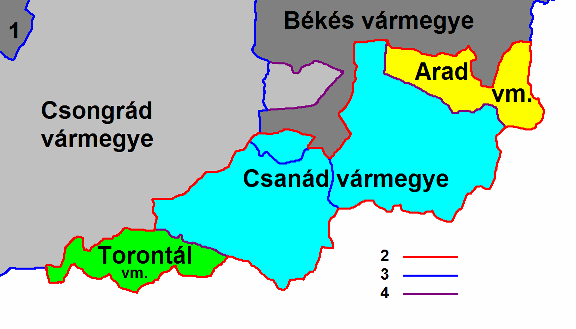
Csanád, Arad and Torontál counties after the Treaty of Trianon. In 1923, the three counties were merged to form Csanád-Arad-Torontál County.

In 1920, the Treaty of Trianon assigned most of the territory of Arad county to Romania, except for a small area south of Békéscsaba, which became part of the newly formed Hungarian county of Csanád-Arad-Torontál in 1923. At the end of World War II, the Hungarian part of Arad county was merged into the recreated Csanád county, but in 1950 that county was split and its territory became part of Békés County.

The rest of the county is now part of the Arad County in Romania. This county also contains parts of the former counties Temes and Krassó-Szörény.

== Demographics ==
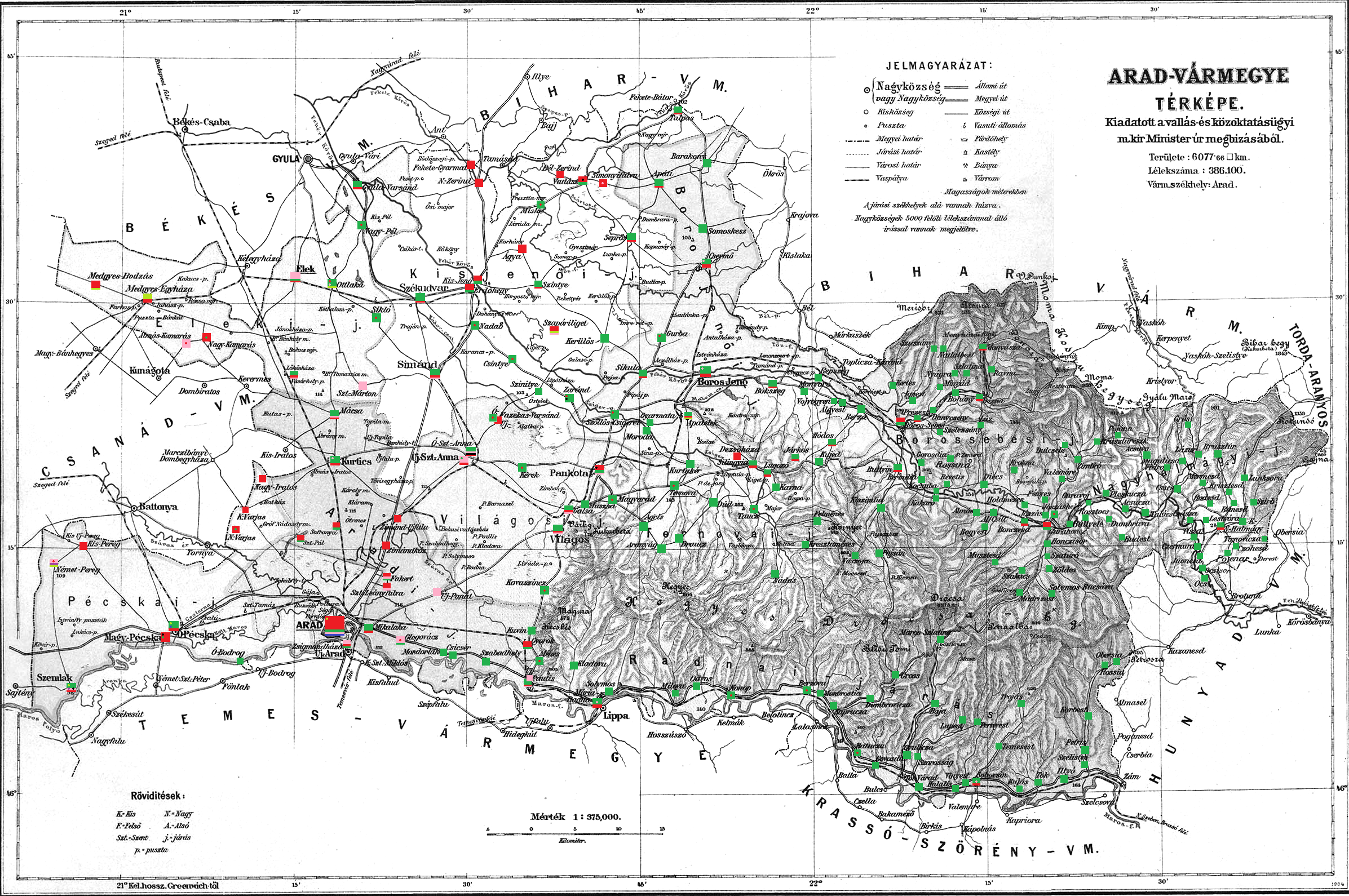
Ethnic map of the county with data of the 1910 census (see the key in the description).

Population by mother tongue (Note: Only linguistic communities > 1% are displayed.)
Census	Total	Romanian	Hungarian	German	Slovak	Other or unknown
1880	303,964	185,241 (63.35%)	67,613 (23,12%)	30,931 (10.58%)	2,938 (1.00%)	5,669 (1.94%)
1890	343,597	208,957 (60.81%)	86,780 (25.26%)	37,303 (10.86%)	4,157 (1.21%)	6,400 (1.86%)
1900	386,100	223,806 (57.97%)	110,823 (28.70%)	40,148 (10.40%)	5,600 (1.45%)	5,723 (1.48%)
1910	414,388	239,755 (57.86%)	124,215 (29.98%)	38,695 (9.34%)	5,451 (1.32%)	6,272 (1.51%)

Population by religion (Note: Only religious communities > 1% are displayed.)
Census	Total	Eastern Orthodox	Roman Catholic	Calvinist	Greek Catholic	Lutheran	Jewish	Other or unknown
1880	303,964	186,758 (61.44%)	75,304 (24.77%)	17,519 (5.76%)	11,079 (3.64%)	5,151 (1.69%)	8,018 (2.64%)	135 (0.04%)
1890	343,597	201,984 (58.79%)	91,045 (26.50%)	20,787 (6.05%)	13,140 (3.82%)	7,495 (2.18%)	8,924 (2.60%)	222 (0.06%)
1900	386,100	215,904 (55.92%)	109,523 (28.37%)	24,849 (6.44%)	15,134 (3.92%)	9,954 (2.58%)	10,085 (2.61%)	651 (0.17%)
1910	414,388	230,907 (55.72%)	117,630 (28.39%)	26,709 (6.45%)	16,318 (3.94%)	10,950 (2.64%)	10,102 (2.44%)	1,772 (0.43%)

== Subdivisions ==
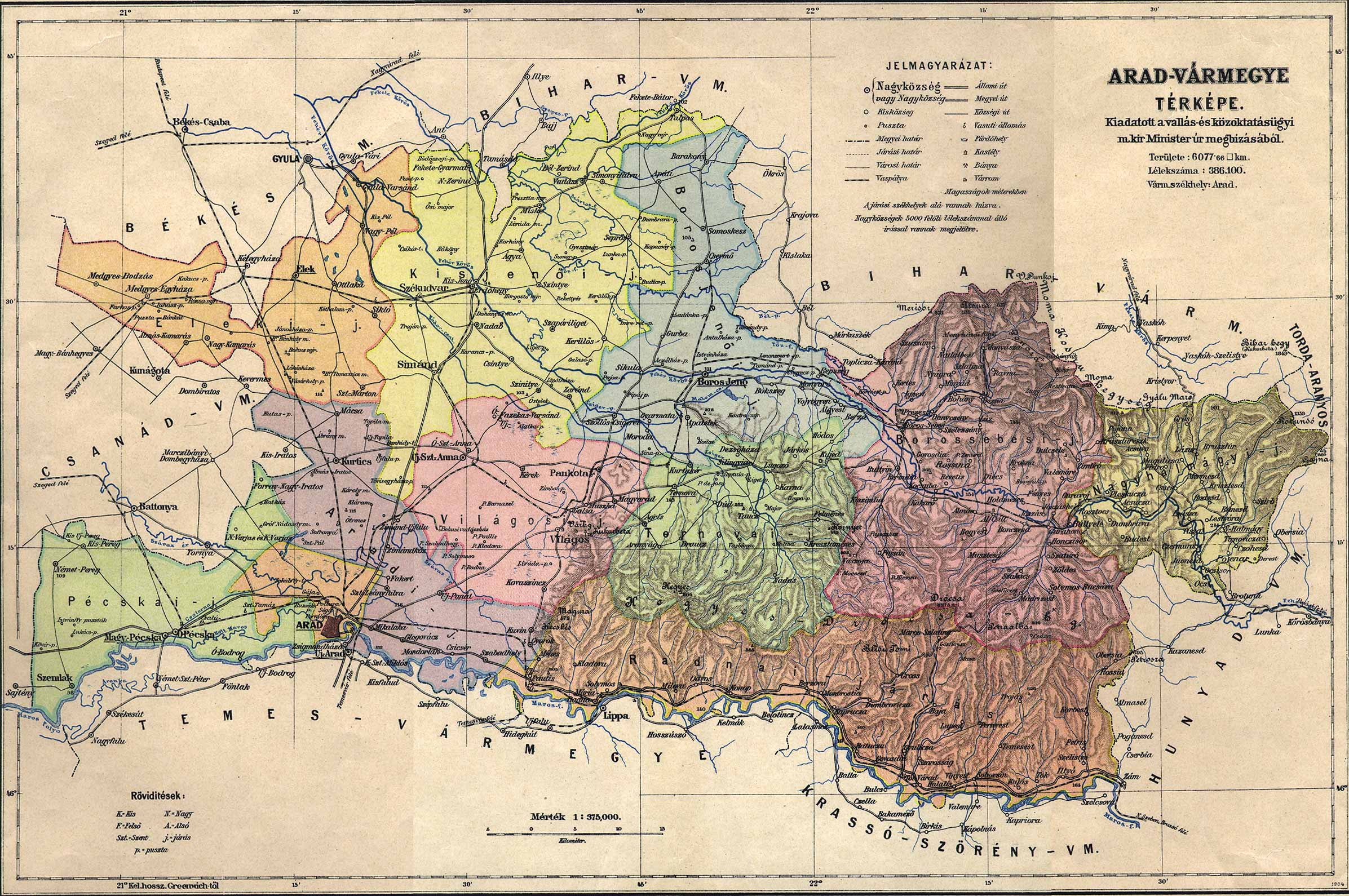

In the early 20th century, the subdivisions of Arad County were:

Districts (járás)
District	Capital
Arad	Arad
Borosjenő	Borosjenő (now Ineu)
Borossebes	Borossebes (now Sebiș)
Elek	Elek
Kisjenő	Kisjenő (now Chișineu-Criș)
Magyarpécska	Magyarpécska (now Pecica)
Máriaradna	Máriaradna (now Radna)
Nagyhalmágy	Nagyhalmágy (now Hălmagiu)
Tornova	Tornova (now Târnova)
Világos	Világos (now Șiria)
Urban counties (törvényhatósági jogú város)
Arad

Elek is now in Hungary. All the other towns mentioned are in Romania.

== List of ispáns ==
=== Middle Ages ===
Term	Incumbent	Monarch	Notes	Source
1214	Clement	Andrew II	son of Benedict from the kindred Csanád	
1238	Paul	Béla IV		
1240	Saul	Béla IV		
c. 1310	Alexander	Charles I	for voivode Ladislaus Kán; castellan of Solymos	
1311	Dominic	Charles I	for voivode Ladislaus Kán; castellan of Solymos	
1319–1321	Thomas Széchényi	Charles I	also master of the treasury for the Queen (1320–1321), voivode (1321–1342), castellan of Solymos	
1321–1372	Arad County was administered by voivodes of Transylvania, who appointed deputies.			
1351	Blaise Pósafi de Szer	Louis I	for duke Stephen, castellan of Hátszeg	
1391	George Báthory	Sigismund	from the Somlyó branch	
1393–1401	Arad County was administered by voivodes of Transylvania, who appointed deputies.			
1404–1426	Pipo of Ozora	Sigismund	also ispán of Temes County	
c. 1427	Emeric Pálóci	Sigismund		
c. 1437	John Országh de Guth	Sigismund	also castellan of Világosvár; ispán of Zaránd and Csongrád Counties	
1441–1444	Ladislaus Maróti	Vladislaus I Ladislaus V	together with John Hunyadi (1443–1444); also ban of Macsó (1441–1443); ispán of Zaránd and Békés Counties	
1443–1456	John Hunyadi	Vladislaus I Ladislaus V	together with Ladislaus Maróti (1443–1444), with Nicholas Újlaki (1444–1446); also voivode (1443–1446); regent-governor of the Kingdom of Hungary (1446–1452)	
1444–1446	Nicholas Újlaki	Ladislaus V	together with John Hunyadi; also voivode; ban of Severin (1445–1446)	

=== Habsburg rule ===
Term	Incumbent	Monarch	Notes	Source
1526–1527	Gáspár Paksy	Ferdinand I John I	for John I, later Ferdinand I	
1527–1614	Unknown office-holders			
1614	András Dóczy	Matthias II	also ispán of Szatmár County	
1614–1702	Unknown office-holders			
1702–1713	Ferenc Klobusiczky	Leopold I Joseph I Charles III	also chief justice (1702–1707); later Kuruc senator and ispán for Francis II Rákóczi	
1713–1736	Pál Consbruch	Charles III	died in office	
1737–1743	Unknown office-holder(s)			
1743–1744	Zsigmond Andrássy	Maria Theresa	administrator	
1744–1751	Antal Grassalkovich	Maria Theresa	also chief justice (1744–1748)	
1751–1788	György Fekete	Maria Theresa; Joseph II	also chief justice (1751–1762); vice-chancellor (1762–1773); master of the stewards (1766–1773); judge royal (1773–1783); director of the royal treasury (1782); died in office	
1788–1790	Vacant	Joseph II		
1790–1821	Pál Almásy	Leopold II; Francis	also master of the horse (1812–1821); poisoned	
1822–1830	József Wenckheim	Francis	died in office	
1830–1837	Lőrinc Orczy	Francis; Ferdinand V		
1837–1845	István Szerencsy	Ferdinand V		
1845–1848	József Fascho de Lucsivna	Ferdinand V		
1848–1849	János Bohus de Világos	Ferdinand V	first term	
1849	József Tomcsányi	Francis Joseph I		
1849–1860	Military District of Großwardein			
1860–1861	János Bohus de Világos	Francis Joseph I	second term	
1861–1867	Vacant	Francis Joseph I		
1867–1869	Béla Szende	Francis Joseph I		
1869–1871	Vacant	Francis Joseph I		
1871–1878	Péter Atzél	Francis Joseph I	resigned	
1879–1886	Károly Tabajdi	Francis Joseph I	died in office	
1886–	László Fábián	Francis Joseph I		
1899–1905	Iván Urbán	Francis Joseph I	first term; resigned	
1906–1910	Gyula Károlyi	Francis Joseph I	later prime minister (1931–1932)	
1910–1915	Iván Urbán	Francis Joseph I	second term; died in office	
1915–1917	Ferenc Baross	Francis Joseph I Charles IV	died in office	
1917	Béla Barabás	Charles IV		
1918–	Lajos Varjassy			

== Clickable map of the Arad County, 1782–85 ==
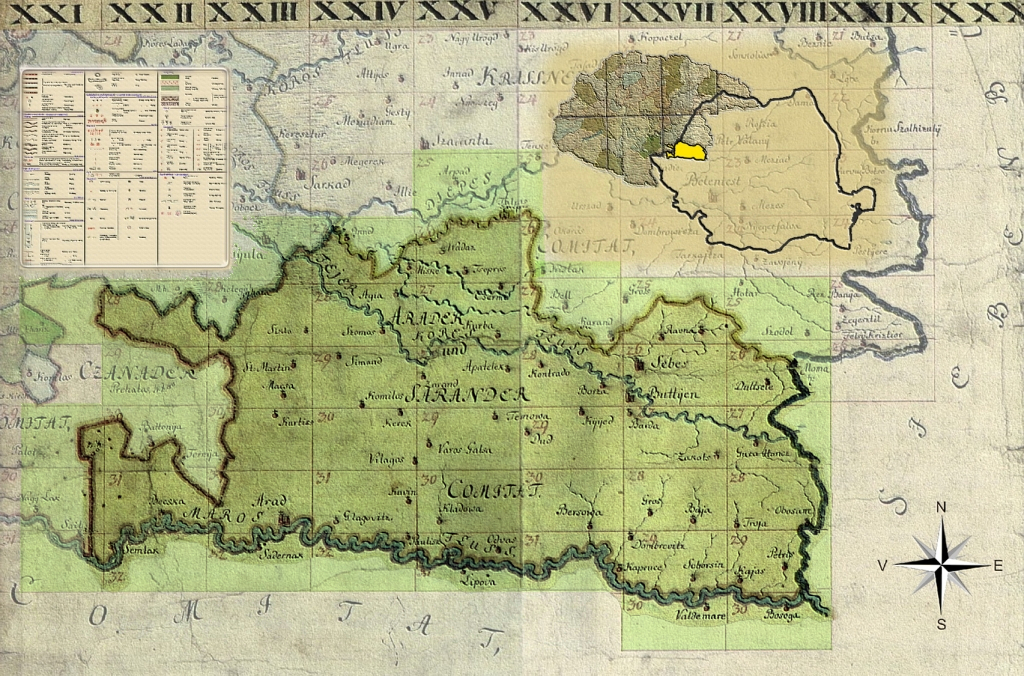
Josephinische Landesaufnahme. Senzitive map of the Arad county, 1782-1785. (Click on the desired quadrant)

== Sources ==
- Benkő, Elek (1994). "Arad 2.". In Kristó, Gyula; Engel, Pál; Makk, Ferenc (eds.). Korai magyar történeti lexikon (9–14. század) [Encyclopedia of the Early Hungarian History (9th–14th centuries)] (in Hungarian). Akadémiai Kiadó. pp. 53–54. ISBN 963-05-6722-9.
- Bóna, István (1994). "The Hungarian–Slav Period (895–1172)". In Köpeczi, Béla; Barta, Gábor; Bóna, István; Makkai, László; Szász, Zoltán; Borus, Judit (eds.). History of Transylvania. Akadémiai Kiadó. pp. 109–177. ISBN 963-05-6703-2.
- Curta, Florin (2006). Southeastern Europe in the Middle Ages, 500-1250. Cambridge University Press. ISBN 978-0-521-89452-4.
- Engel, Pál (1996). Magyarország világi archontológiája, 1301–1457, I. [Secular Archontology of Hungary, 1301–1457, Volume I] (in Hungarian). História, MTA Történettudományi Intézete. ISBN 963-8312-44-0.
- Fallenbüchl, Zoltán (1994). Magyarország főispánjai, 1526–1848 [Lord-Lieutenants of Counties in Hungary, 1526–1848] (in Hungarian). Argumentum Kiadó. ISBN 963-7719-81-4.
- Györffy, György (1987). Az Árpád-kori Magyarország történeti földrajza, I: Abaújvár, Arad, Árva, Bács, Baranya, Bars, Békés, Bereg, Beszterce, Bihar, Bodrog, Borsod, Brassó, Csanád és Csongrád megye [Historical Geography of Hungary of the Árpáds, Volume I: The Counties of Abaújvár, Arad, Árva, Bács, Baranya, Bars, Békés, Bereg, Beszterce, Bihar, Bodrog, Borsod, Brassó, Csanád and Csongrád] (in Hungarian). Akadémiai Kiadó. ISBN 963-05-4200-5.
- Kristó, Gyula (1988). A vármegyék kialakulása Magyarországon [The Development of the Counties in Hungary] (in Hungarian). Magvető Kiadó. ISBN 963-14-1189-3.
- Zsoldos, Attila (2011). Magyarország világi archontológiája, 1000–1301. [Secular Archontology of Hungary, 1000–1301] (in Hungarian). História, MTA Történettudományi Intézete. ISBN 978-963-9627-38-3.
