= Nicholas II of Transylvania =

Hungarian nobleman

Nicholas II

Voivode of Transylvania
- Reign: 1213
- Predecessor: Bertoldo de Merania
- Successor: Julius Kán
- Died: after 1213

Nicholas II (died after 1213; Hungarian: Miklós) was a Hungarian distinguished nobleman, who served as voivode of Transylvania in 1213, during the reign of Andrew II of Hungary.

Before his voivodeship, Nicholas II served as ispán (comes) of Csanád (1206), Bihar (1207, 1209) and Újvár Counties (1212). Nicholas II maybe was the same person as Nicholas from the kindred Csák, who functioned as ispán of several counties in the coming decades.

== Sources ==
- Engel, Pál (2001). The Realm of St Stephen: A History of Medieval Hungary, 895-1526. I.B. Tauris Publishers. ISBN 1-86064-061-3.
- (in Hungarian) Markó, László (2006). A magyar állam főméltóságai Szent Istvántól napjainkig – Életrajzi Lexikon ("The High Officers of the Hungarian State from Saint Stephen to the Present Days – A Biographical Encyclopedia") (2nd edition); Helikon Kiadó Kft., Budapest; ISBN 963-547-085-1.
- (in Hungarian) Zsoldos, Attila (2011). Magyarország világi archontológiája, 1000–1301 ("Secular Archontology of Hungary, 1000–1301"). História, MTA Történettudományi Intézete. Budapest. ISBN 978-963-9627-38-3

Political offices
Preceded by Bertoldo de Merania	Voivode of Transylvania; 1213	Succeeded by Julius Kán
