= Mika the Bearded =

Hungarian nobleman

Ispán of Bihar
- Reign: 1212–1216; 1219–1221; 1226
- Predecessor: Bánk Bár-Kalán (1st term); Neuka (2nd term); Theodore Csanád (3rd term)
- Successor: Neuka (1st term); Buzád Hahót (2nd term); Nicholas Csák (3rd term)
- Died: after 1235

Mika the Bearded (Hungarian: Szakállas Mika, Old East Slavic: Mika Bradatyj; died after 1235) was a Hungarian nobleman at the turn of the 12th and 13th centuries, who served as ispán of Bihar County three times during the reign of King Andrew II of Hungary.

== Background ==
The origin of Mika (also Mica, Myke or Michael) is unknown. He is not identical with his namesake contemporary Palatine Mika Ják. A certain Gylianus, son of Bocion, who acted as pristaldus (bailiff) on his behalf, referred to Mika as his "contubernarius", which phrase described the political and social relationship between them, a kind of proto-familiaritas. It is possible that Mika originated from a noble family, which possessed landholdings in Bihar County. He owned Jenő (present-day Ineu, Romania) along the northern bank of Sebes-Körös (Crișul Repede) river. He also received the estate Malka in Szatmár County from Drugh (Dorog), the father of Alexander Karászi. Based on the possession history of this settlement, historian Péter Németh argued Mika belonged to the gens (clan) Kaplon.

== Career ==
Sometime between 1190 and 1198, Mika founded a Benedictine monastery in Telki in Pilis County, dedicated to the first Hungarian king Saint Stephen I. As possessor of the right of patronage, Mika sold three estates of the monastery to the Provostry of Székesfehérvár, according to a letter of Pope Innocent III in 1215–1216. Mika petitioned to the Roman Curia in 1224; according to his complaint to Pope Honorius III, there were hardly any monks left in the monastery to worship because of the general indiscipline. Mika unsuccessfully requested the pope to transfer the monastery under the supervision of the Cistercians of Heiligenkreuz Abbey. However, the Telki Abbey remained in the hands of the Benedictine friars.

Mika was a confidant of King Andrew II. Along with other noblemen, he participated in the Hungarian military campaign against the Principality of Halych in the summer of 1211, when Andrew II intended to restore the child Danylo Romanovich to the Galician throne upon the request of a group of boyars. The Galician–Volhynian Chronicle refers to him with the epithet "the Bearded" (Barbatus or Borodaty). Mika was wounded in the skirmish against the Cumans, who supported the aspirations of Vladimir Igorevich. The Galician–Volhynian Chronicle incorrectly claims that a Cuman chieftain Tobaša cut off his head.

Returning to Hungary, Mika was made ispán of Bihar County in 1212. He held the dignity until 1216, when he was replaced by a certain Neuka. The Regestrum Varadinense preserved much details of his activity as ispán. His deputies (curialis comes) were Sicula, Nuethlen, Paul and Demetrius in the period between 1213 and 1215. Mika served as ispán of Bihar County for the second time from 1219 to 1221. The name of his two commissioners are preserved, Kölked and Farkas. King Andrew II commissioned Mika, endowing him with special licenses, to judge over legal cases involving the privileged group of royal servants in 1220. According to a charter from that year, the "fellows of Bihar County" (i.e. royal servants) sought justice in a matter of theft from Mika, "the judge dispatched by King Andrew". The royal servants of Békés and Kolozs counties turned to Mika's special judicial court too. Upon the king's order, Mika also judged over lawsuits concerning royal servants in Zala and Somogy counties, in the opposite part of the Kingdom of Hungary. These data prove that Mika's jurisdiction regarding the legal cases of the royal servants geographically covered the entire territory of the realm, after Andrew II delegated this function specifically to him. Mika was styled as ispán of Nyitra County in 1223. He again administered Bihar County in 1226.

After Andrew's eldest son and rival, Béla IV ascended the Hungarian throne in 1235, Mika fell out of the favor of the royal and completely lost political influence. Along with other courtiers, such as Nicholas Szák and the former treasurer Nicholas, Mika was convicted of "high treason", while other barons of the late Andrew were executed or imprisoned. According to a letter of Béla IV to Pope Gregory IX around August 1236, Mika had usurped much of the crown revenues and deposited it with local churches (possibly in Bihar County). The Hungarian king confiscated the estate Jenő from him and handed over it to his confidant Paul Geregye prior to 1236. The fate of Mika is unknown.

== Sources ==
- F. Romhányi, Beatrix (2000). Kolostorok és társaskáptalanok a középkori Magyarországon: Katalógus [Monasteries and Collegiate Chapters in Medieval Hungary: A Catalogue] (in Hungarian). Pytheas. ISBN 963-7483-07-1.
- Font, Márta (2021). The Kings of the House of Árpád and the Rurikid Princes. Cooperation and conflict in medieval Hungary and Kievan Rus'. Arpadiana VIII., Research Centre for the Humanities. ISBN 978-963-416-278-0.
- Németh, Péter (2008). A középkori Szatmár megye települései a 15. század elejéig [Settlements of the medieval Szatmár County until the early 15th century] (in Hungarian). Jósa András Múzeum Kiadványai 60. ISBN 978-963-7220-63-0.
- Szőcs, Tibor (2014). A nádori intézmény korai története, 1000–1342 [An Early History of the Palatinal Institution: 1000–1342] (in Hungarian). Magyar Tudományos Akadémia Támogatott Kutatások Irodája. ISBN 978-963-508-697-9.
- Zsoldos, Attila (1998). "Közszabad nemzetségek [The Middle Privileged Clans]". Mediævalia Transilvanica. 2 (1): 43–60. ISSN 1453-8520.
- Zsoldos, Attila (2011). Magyarország világi archontológiája, 1000–1301 [Secular Archontology of Hungary, 1000–1301] (in Hungarian). História, MTA Történettudományi Intézete. ISBN 978-963-9627-38-3.

Political offices
Preceded by Bánk Bár-Kalán	Ispán of Bihar; 1212–1216	Succeeded by Neuka
Preceded by Neuka	Ispán of Bihar; 1219–1221	Succeeded by Buzád Hahót
Preceded by Lawrence Atyusz	Ispán of Nyitra; 1223	Succeeded by Ladislaus Kán
Preceded by Theodore Csanád	Ispán of Bihar; 1226	Succeeded by Nicholas Csák
