= Hajdú County =

County of the Kingdom of Hungary

Hajdú County Comitatus Hajdonicalis (Latin) Hajdú vármegye (Hungarian) Komitat Heiduck (German)
- County of the Kingdom of Hungary (1876-1946); County of the Second Hungarian Republic (1946-1949); County of the Hungarian People's Republic (1949-1950)
- Coat of arms

- Capital: Debrecen
- Area
  - Coordinates: 47°32′N 21°38′E
  - 1910: 3,343 km^{2} (1,291 sq mi)
- Population
  - 1910: 253,863
- History
  - Established: 1876
  - Merged into Hajdú-Bihar County: 16 March 1950
- Today part of: Hungary

Hajdú, formerly known as Hajdúság, was an administrative county (comitatus) of the Kingdom of Hungary. The capital of the county was Debrecen. The territory of the county is now part of the Hungarian county Hajdú-Bihar.

== Geography ==
Hajdú county shared borders with the counties Heves, Borsod, Szabolcs, Bihar, Békés and Jász-Nagykun-Szolnok. The river Tisza touched its western border. The Hortobágy National Park steppe lies in the county. Its area was 3343 km² around 1910.

== History ==
Historically, the Hajdúság region had a special status in the Kingdom of Hungary as an autonomous territory for the hajduks, the Hajdúkerület. The autonomous district was much smaller than Hajdú County, with the remainder forming south-western parts of Szabolcs County and north-western parts of Bihar County (including Hajdú's seat Debrecen).

Following the Hungarian Revolution of 1848, in the 1850s the county of North-Bihar was established around Debrecen, encompassing the Hajdúkerület and parts of the Bihar and Szabolcs counties. This county was larger than the later Hajdú County reaching as far south as the Berettyó/Barcău river and further north to the border of Zemplén County. (See Bihar County#Modern times for more information.) The pre-1848 divisions of Hungary, including the Hajdúkerület, were restored in October 1860.

In 1876, in the administrative reforms which followed the 1867 Austro-Hungarian compromise, Hajdú was established as a full county.

At the 1950 county reform, it was merged with Bihar County (the Hungarian part of pre-Trianon Bihar County) and some smaller parts of the former Szabolcs County to form Hajdú-Bihar County, with its capital at Debrecen.

== Demographics ==
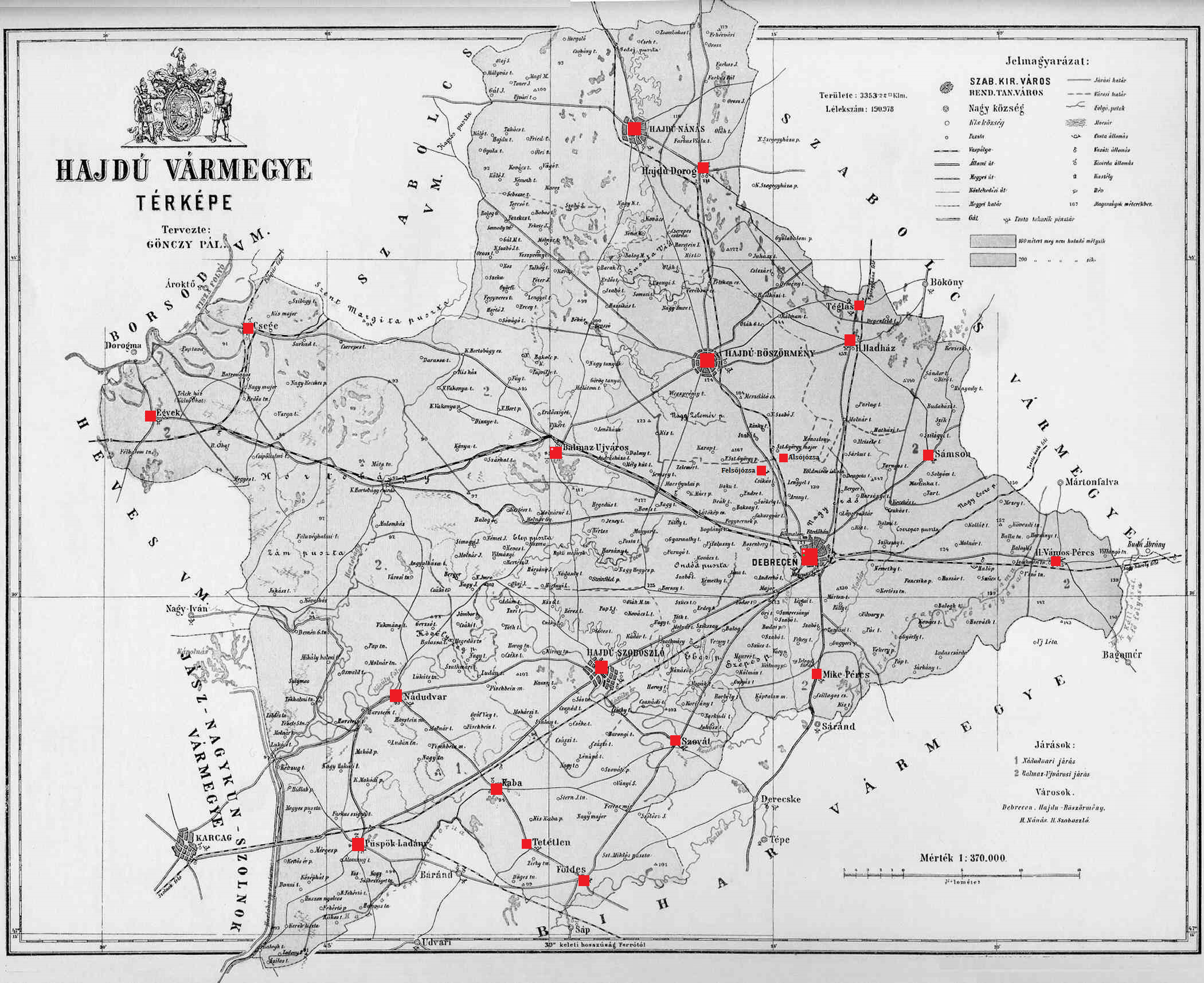
Ethnic map of the county with data of the 1910 census (see the key in the description).

Population by mother tongue (Note: Only linguistic communities > 1% are displayed.)
Census	Total	Hungarian	German	Other or unknown
1880	173,329	164,320 (97.75%)	2,788 (1.66%)	998 (0.59%)
1890	190,978	189,193 (99.07%)	1,132 (0.59%)	653 (0.34%)
1900	223,612	221,798 (99.19%)	972 (0.43%)	842 (0.38%)
1910	253,863	251,918 (99.23%)	1,044 (0.41%)	901 (0.35%)

Population by religion (Note: Only religious communities > 1% are displayed.)
Census	Total	Calvinist	Roman Catholic	Greek Catholic	Jewish	Other or unknown
1880	173,329	135,744 (78.32%)	18,014 (10.39%)	9,986 (5.76%)	8,444 (4.87%)	1,141 (0.66%)
1890	190,978	147,141 (77.05%)	21,795 (11.41%)	10,999 (5.76%)	9,749 (5.10%)	1,294 (0.68%)
1900	223,612	166,063 (74.26%)	29,549 (13.21%)	13,509 (6.04%)	12,806 (5.73%)	1,685 (0.75%)
1910	253,863	185,648 (73.13%)	35,059 (13.81%)	15,336 (6.04%)	15,301 (6.03%)	2,519 (0.99%)

== Subdivisions ==
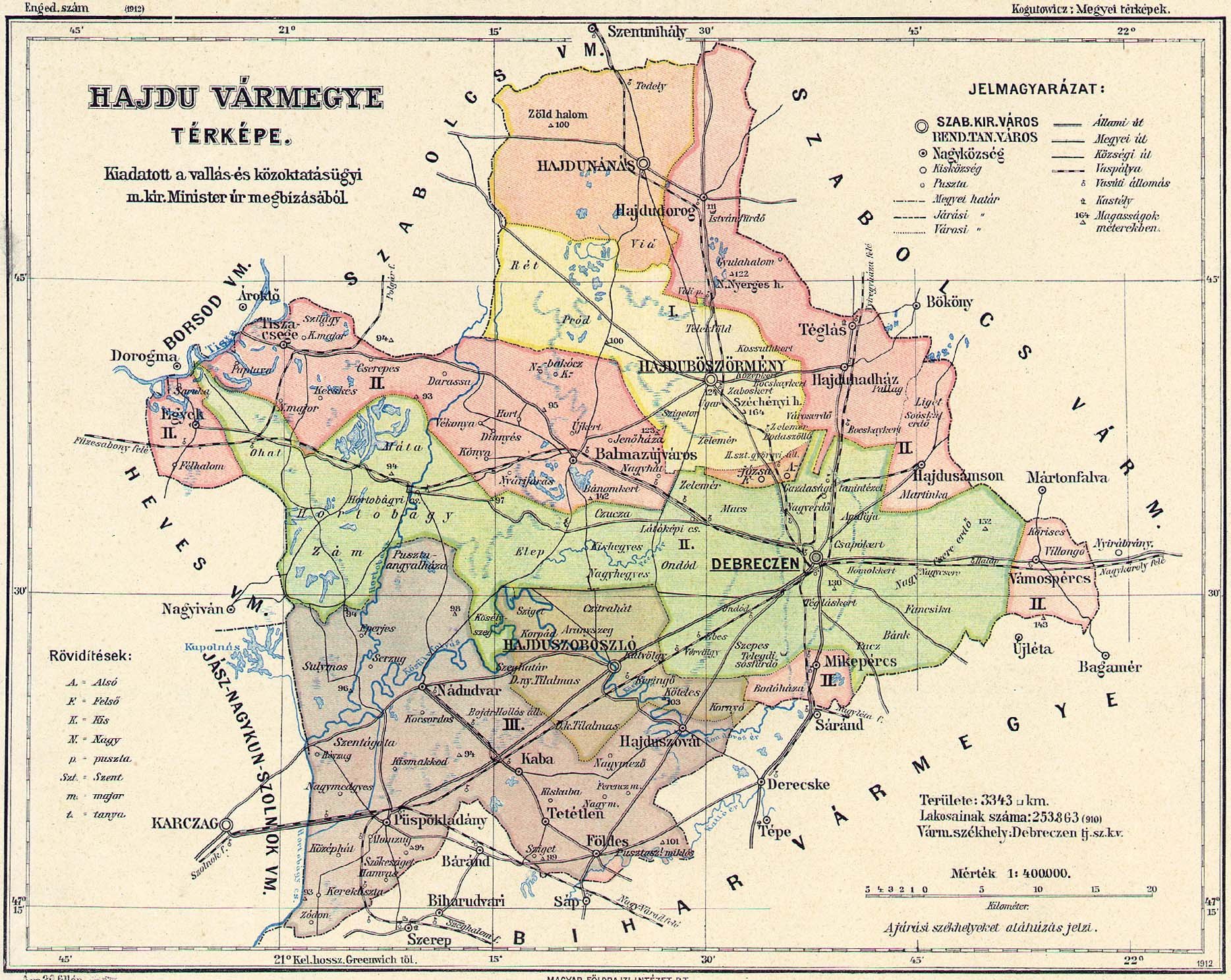

In the early 20th century, the subdivisions of Hajdú county were:

Districts (járás)
District	Capital
Hajdúböszörmény	Hajdúböszörmény
Hajdúszoboszló	Hajdúszoboszló
Központ	Debrecen
Urban counties (törvényhatósági jogú város)
Debrecen
Urban districts (rendezett tanácsú város)
Hajdúböszörmény
Hajdúnánás
Hajdúszoboszló
