= Békés County (former) =

County of the Kingdom of Hungary

Békés County Comitatus Bekesiensis (Latin) Békés vármegye (Hungarian) Komitat Békés (German) Békešská župa (Slovak)
- County of the Kingdom of Hungary (11th century-1541); County of the Eastern Hungarian Kingdom (1541-1566); County of the Kingdom of Hungary (1699-1786, 1790-1853, 1860-1946)
- Coat of arms

- Capital: Békés; Gyula (1405-1946)
- Area
  - Coordinates: 46°39′N 21°16′E
  - 1910: 3,670 km^{2} (1,420 sq mi)
- Population
  - 1910: 298,710
- History
  - Established: 11th century
  - Ottoman conquest: 1566
  - County recreated: 1699
  - Merged into Békés-Csanád-Csongrád County: 1 June 1786
  - County recreated: 26 April 1790
  - Merged into \-Csanád County: 10 January 1853
  - County recreated: 20 October 1860
  - Monarchy abolished: 1 February 1946
- Today part of: Hungary

Békés was an administrative county (comitatus) of the Kingdom of Hungary. Its territory, which was smaller than that of present Békés county, is now in southeastern Hungary. The capital of the county was Gyula.

== Geography ==
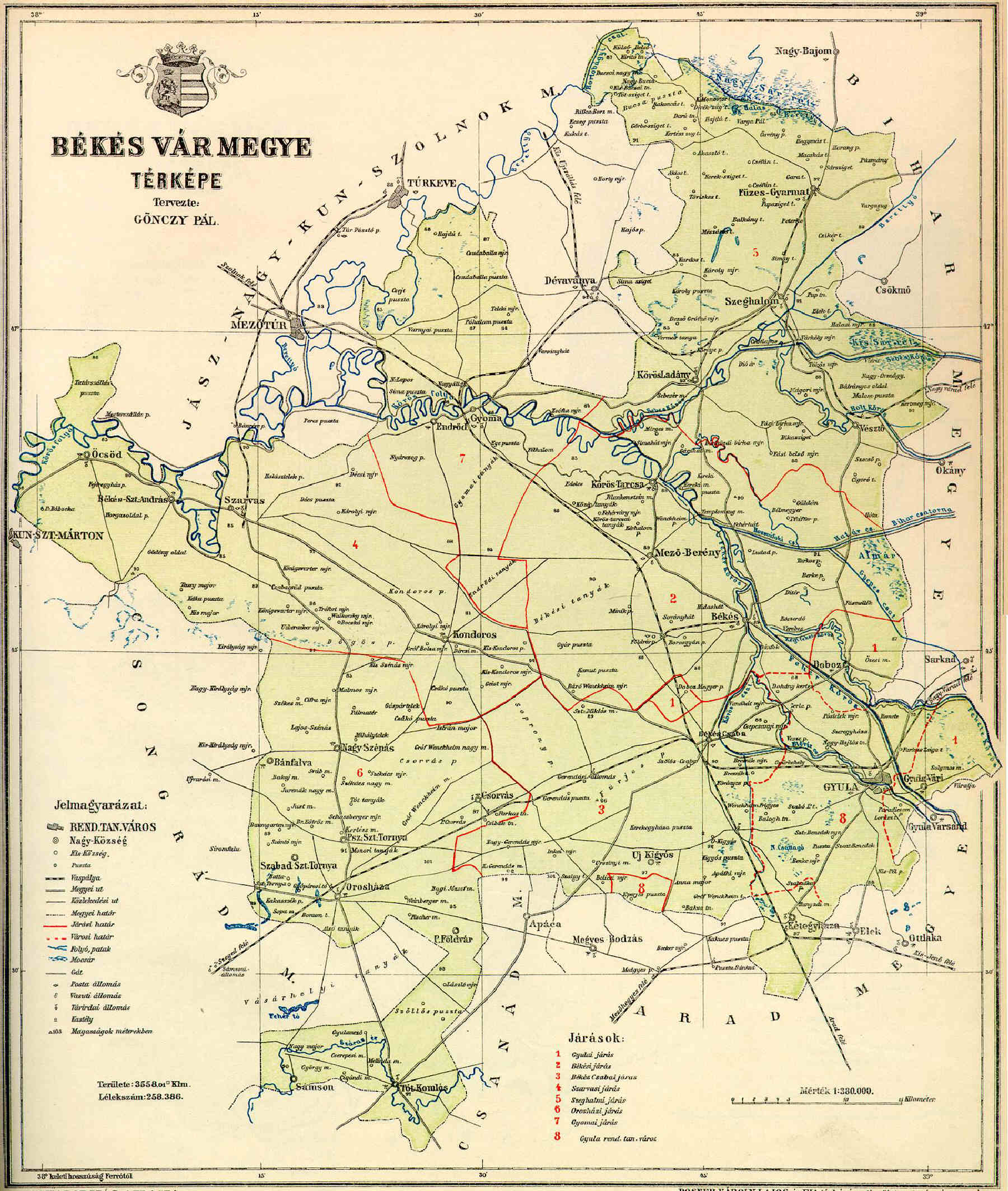
Map of Bekes, 1891.

Békés county shared borders with the Hungarian counties Csongrád, Jász-Nagykun-Szolnok, Hajdú, Bihar, Arad and Csanád. The river Körös flowed through the county. Its area was 3,670 km^{2} around 1910.

== History ==
Békés county arose as one of the first comitatus of the Kingdom of Hungary, in the 11th century. In 1950, the territory of Békés county was expanded with:

- the northeastern part of former Csanád-Arad-Torontál county (the Hungarian part of pre-1920 Arad county and the north-eastern part of pre-1920 Csanád county)
- a part of former Bihar county (the area around Sarkad and Okány)
- a part of Jász-Nagykun-Szolnok county (the area around Dévaványa)

== Demographics ==
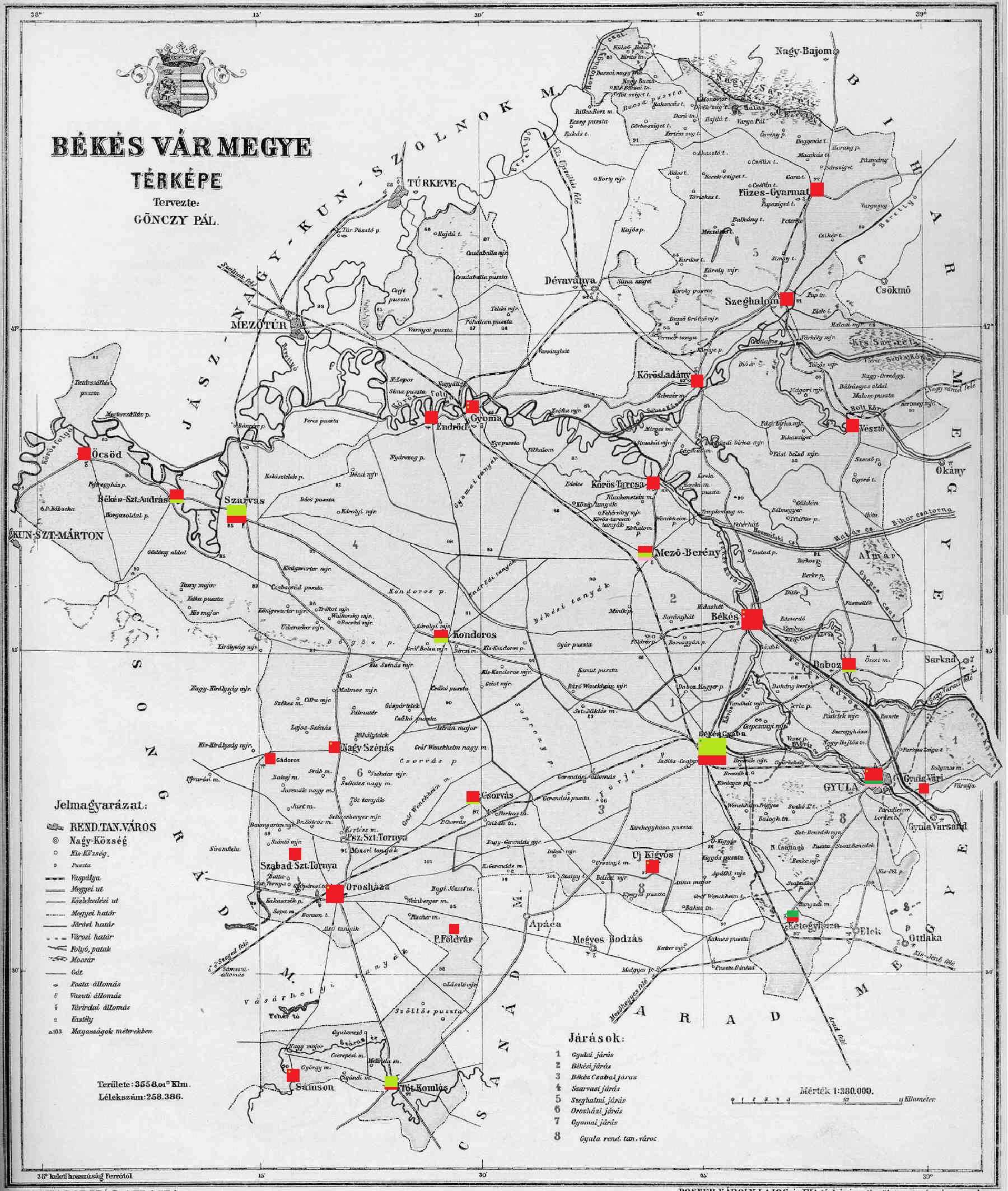
Ethnic map of the county with data of the 1910 census (see the key in the description).

Population by mother tongue (Note: Only linguistic communities > 1% are displayed.)
Census	Total	Hungarian	Slovak	Romanian	German	Other or unknown
1880	229,757	152,877 (69.84%)	53,517 (24.45%)	5,347 (2.44%)	6,611 (3.02%)	530 (0.24%)
1890	258,386	188,781 (73.06%)	56,876 (22.01%)	6,019 (2.33%)	6,110 (2.36%)	600 (0.23%)
1900	278,731	201,619 (72.33%)	64,467 (23.13%)	6,069 (2.18%)	6,191 (2.22%)	385 (0.14%)
1910	298,710	219,261 (73.40%)	66,770 (22.35%)	6,125 (2.05%)	6,048 (2.02%)	506 (0.17%)

Population by religion (Note: Only religious communities > 1% are displayed.)
Census	Total	Lutheran	Calvinist	Roman Catholic	Eastern Orthodox	Jewish	Other or unknown
1880	229,757	82,780 (36.03%)	82,129 (35.75%)	50,838 (22.13%)	7,149 (3.11%)	6,255 (2.72%)	606 (0.26%)
1890	258,386	92,327 (35.73%)	91,339 (35.35%)	58,867 (22.78%)	7,477 (2.89%)	7,189 (2.78%)	1,187 (0.46%)
1900	278,731	98,882 (35.48%)	95,548 (34.28%)	66,857 (23.99%)	7,870 (2.82%)	7,358 (2.64%)	2,216 (0.80%)
1910	298,710	105,724 (35.39%)	98,596 (33.01%)	75,738 (25.36%)	8,374 (2.80%)	7,444 (2.49%)	2,834 (0.95%)

== Subdivisions ==
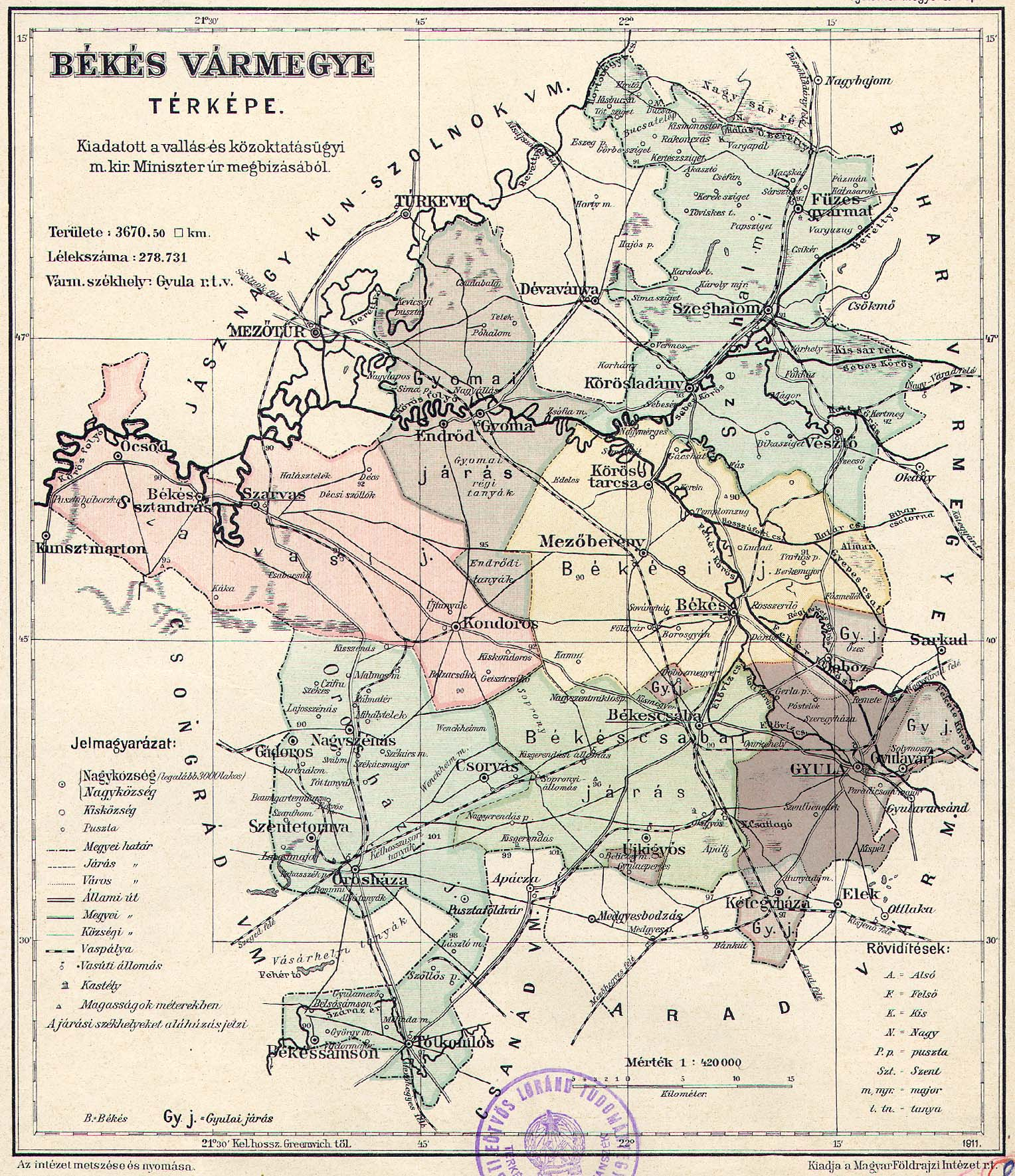

In the early 20th century, the subdivisions of Békés county were:

Districts (járás)
District	Capital
Békés	Békés
Békéscsaba	Békéscsaba
Gyoma	Gyoma
Gyula	Gyula
Orosháza	Orosháza
Szarvas	Szarvas
Szeghalom	Szeghalom
Urban districts (rendezett tanácsú város)
Gyula

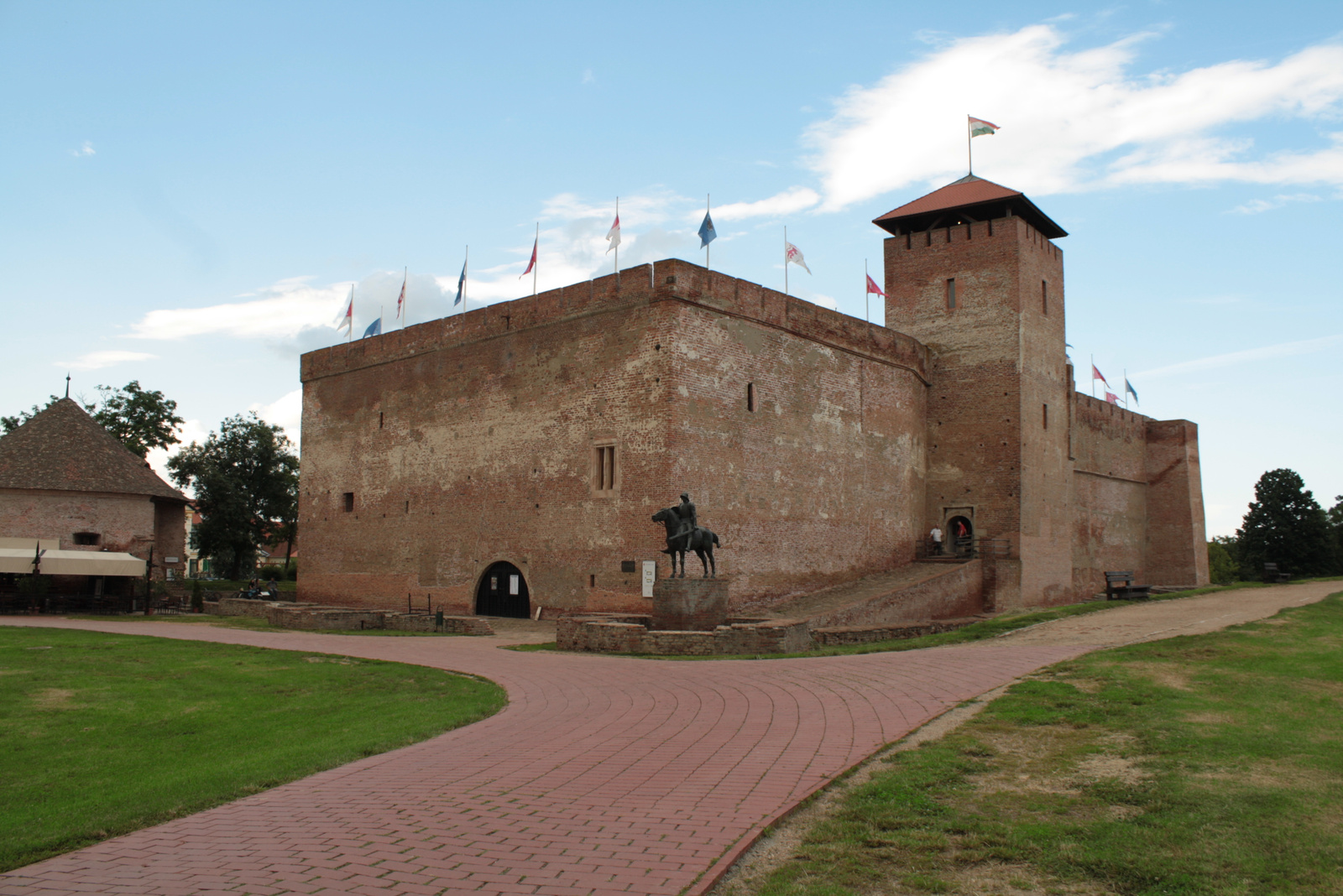
Gyula Castle
