= Csanád County =

Administrative county of the Kingdom of Hungary

Csanád County Comitatus Chanadiensis (Latin) Csanád vármegye (Hungarian) Komitat Tschanad (German) Čanadská župa (Slovak) Comitatul Cenad (Romanian)
- County of the Kingdom of Hungary (11th century – 1542); County of the Eastern Hungarian Kingdom (1542–1552); County of the Kingdom of Hungary (1699–1786, 1790–1853, 1860–1923, 1945–1946); County of the Second Hungarian Republic (1946–1949); County of the Hungarian People's Republic (1949–1950)
- Coat of arms

- Capital: Marosvár (Csanád) 1028–; Makó (1730–1950)
- Area
  - Coordinates: 46°13′N 20°29′E
  - 1910: 1,714 km^{2} (662 sq mi)
- Population
  - 1910: 145,248
- History
  - Established: 11th century
  - Ottoman conquest: 1552
  - County recreated: 1699
  - Merged into Békés-Csanád-Csongrád County: 1 June 1786
  - County recreated: 26 April 1790
  - Merged into Békés-Csanád County: 10 January 1853
  - County recreated: 20 October 1860
  - Treaty of Trianon: 4 June 1920
  - Merged into Csanád-Arad-Torontál County: 1923
  - County recreated: 1945
  - Disestablished: 16 March 1950
- Today part of: Hungary (1,469 km^{2}); Romania (245 km^{2})
- Cenad is now the name of the former capital.

Csanád was an administrative county (comitatus) of the Kingdom of Hungary. Its territory is now part of Hungary, except for a small area which is part of Romania. The capital of the county was Makó.

== Geography ==
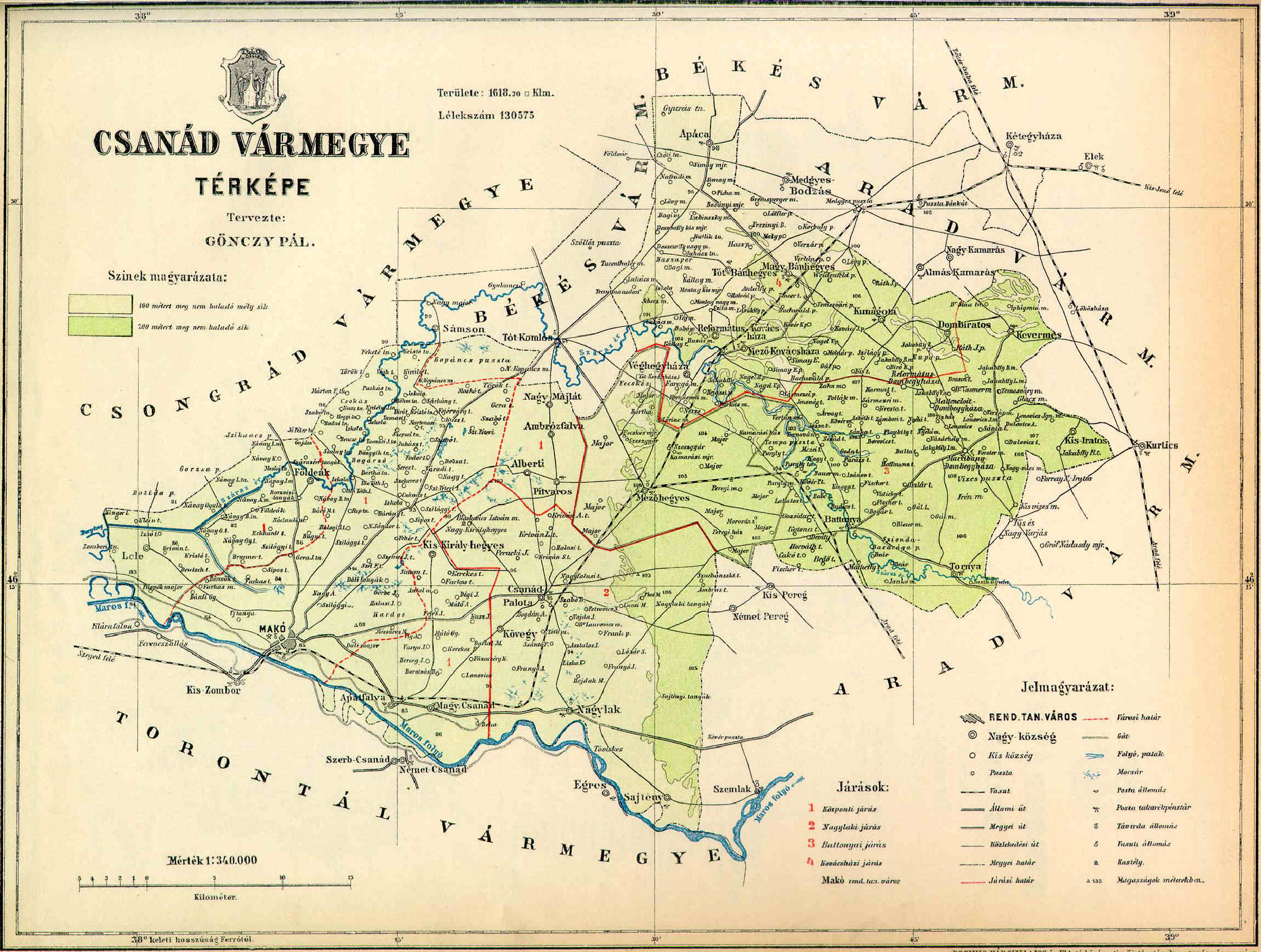
Map of Csanád, 1891

Csanád county shared borders with the Hungarian counties of Csongrád, Békés, Arad and Torontál. The river Maros (Mureș) formed its southern border. Its area was 1,714 km^{2} around 1910.

== History ==
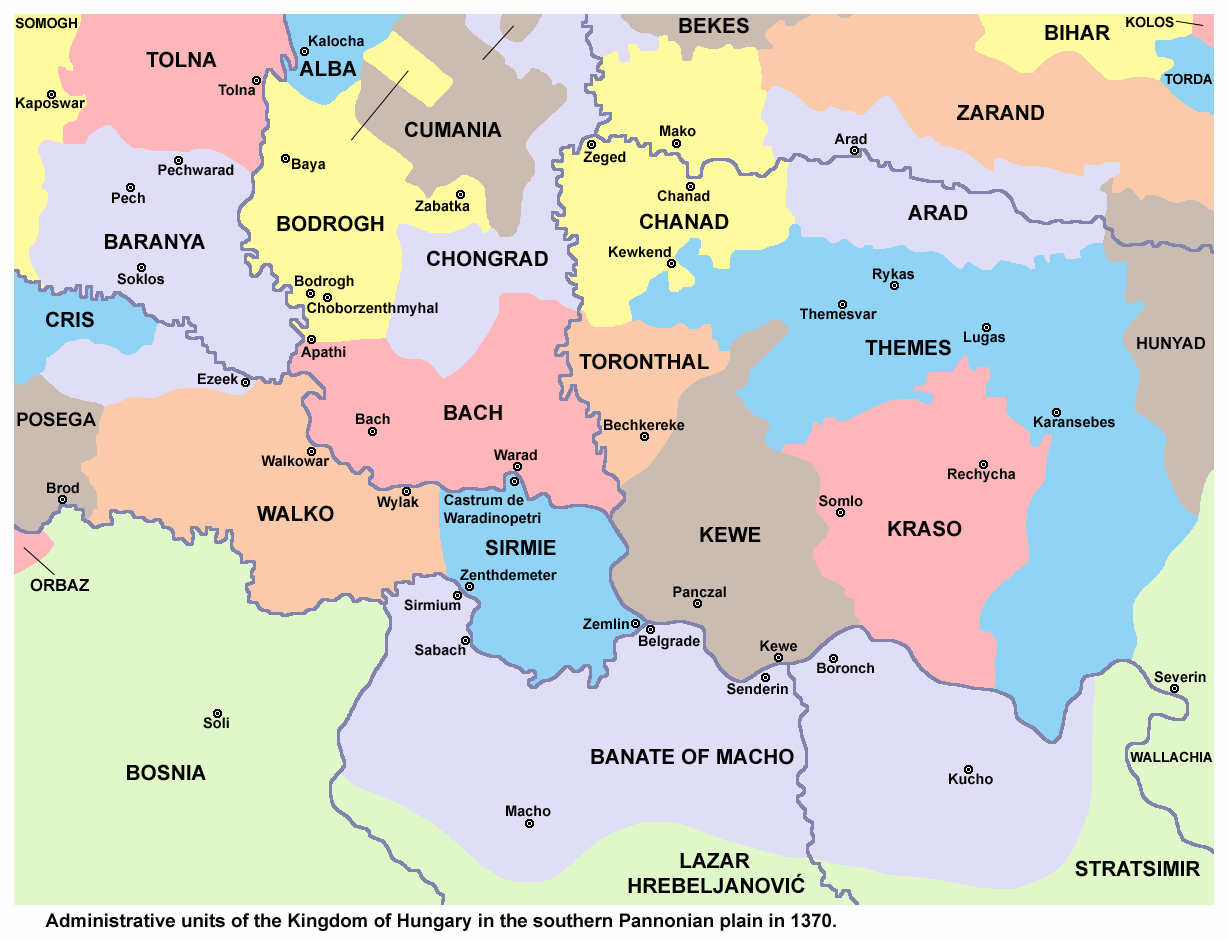
Csanád County within the Kingdom of Hungary around 1370

The county's territory became part of the Kingdom of Hungary in the first half of the 11th century when Stephen I of Hungary defeated Ajtony, the local ruler. The county got its name after the commander of the royal army, Csanád. The king appointed Gerard of Csanád as the first bishop of Csanád. The county was initially much larger and included territories of the later Temes, Arad, and Torontál counties. The first seat of the county was Csanád (present-day Cenad, Romania).

The county's territory became part of the Ottoman Empire in the 16th century. The settlement structure was almost completely destroyed during the Ottoman–Habsburg wars. In the Treaty of Karlowitz, the Ottoman Empire renounced its claims to the territories north of the Maros (Mureș) river. Csanád county was reorganized in the returned territories (with greatly reduced size than in medieval times). Makó became the seat of the reorganized county.

After World War I, the county was occupied by the Romanian army. In 1920, the Treaty of Trianon assigned a small area in the southeast of the county (the town of Nădlac and the villages of Șeitin, Turnu and Dorobanți) to Romania. The rest of the county was united with parts of Torontál county (a small area south of Szeged) and Arad county (a small area south of Békéscsaba) to form the new county of Csanád-Arad-Torontál in 1923.

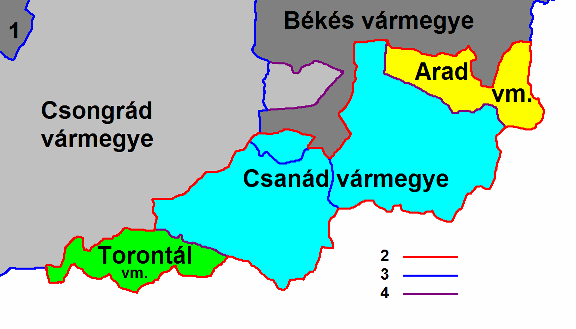
Csanád, Arad and Torontál counties after the Treaty of Trianon. In 1923, the three counties were merged to form Csanád-Arad-Torontál County.

After World War II, the county was recreated, but in 1950 it was divided between the Hungarian counties of Békés and Csongrád (since 4 June 2020, the latter was renamed to Csongrád-Csanád County). The Romanian part of the former Csanád county is now part of Arad County.

== Demographics ==
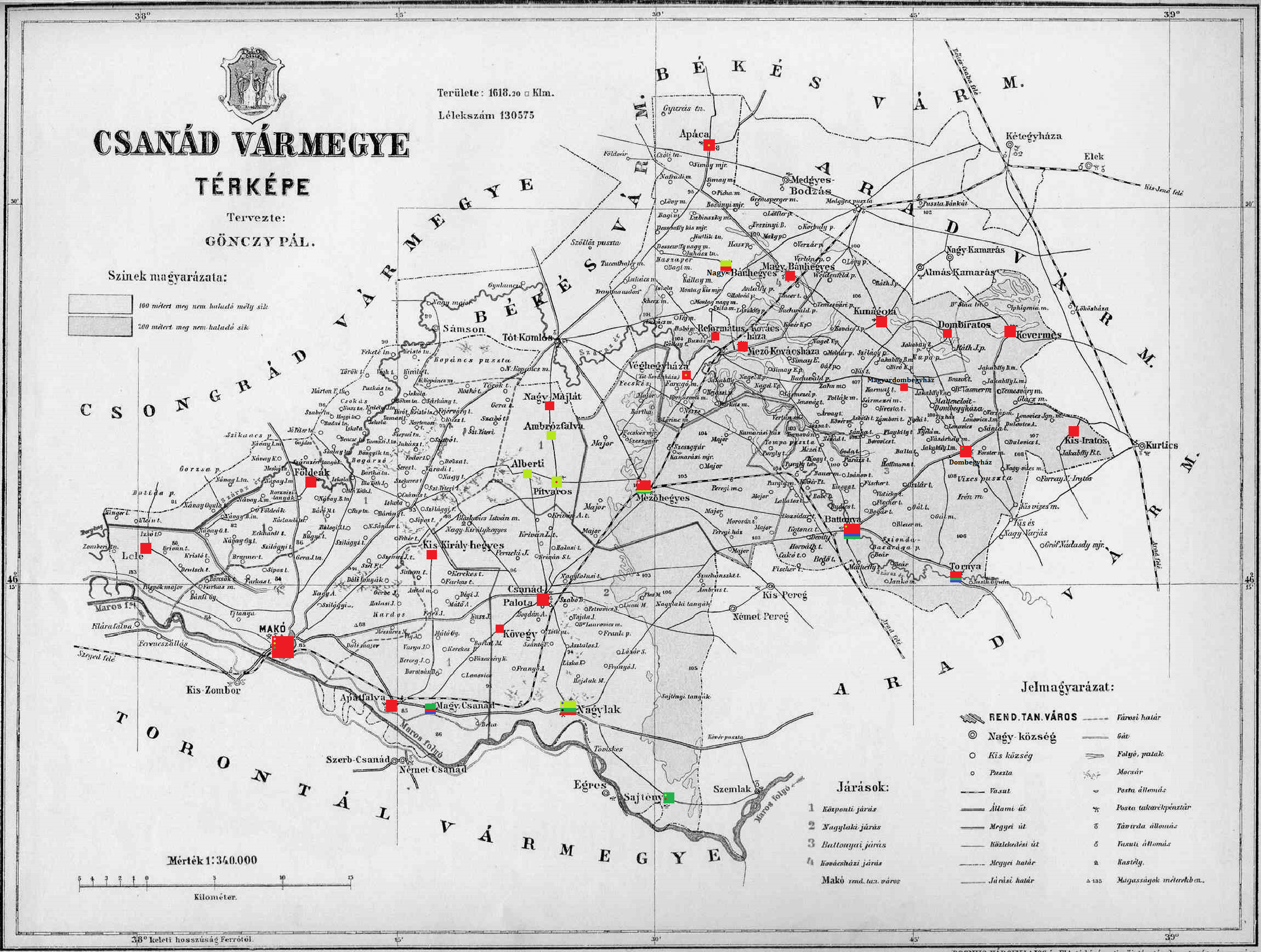
Ethnic map of the county with data of the 1910 census (see the key in the description).

Csanád county was one of the most densely populated counties of the Kingdom of Hungary. The Hungarians formed an ethnic majority in every district except for the district of Nagylak. The main part of the Slovaks lived in the district of Nagylak, the Romanians lived mostly in the districts of Nagylak and Battonya, while the Serbs lived in the district of Battonya.

Population by mother tongue (Note: Only linguistic communities > 1% are displayed.)
Census	Total	Hungarian	Slovak	Romanian	Serbian	German	Other or unknown
1880	109,011	75,344 (72.74%)	12,433 (12.00%)	11,099 (10.72%)	3,186 (3.08%) (Note: Serbian and Croatian.)	1,111 (1.07%)	404 (0.39%)
1890	130,575	95,229 (72.93%)	15,735 (12.05%)	13,689 (10.48%)	3,853 (2.95%)	1,410 (1.08%)	659 (0.50%)
1900	140,007	103,242 (73.74%)	17,274 (12.34%)	13,982 (9.99%)	3,981 (2.84%)	1,182 (0.84%)	346 (0.25%)
1910	145,248	108,621 (74.78%)	17,133 (11.80%)	14,046 (9.67%)	3,967 (2.73%)	1,013 (0.70%)	468 (0.32%)

Population by religion (Note: Only religious communities > 1% are displayed.)
Census	Total	Roman Catholic	Calvinist	Lutheran	Eastern Orthodox	Greek Catholic	Jewish	Other or unknown
1880	109,011	53,634 (49.20%)	21,706 (19.91%)	12,820 (11.76%)	13,679 (12.55%)	4,133 (3.79%)	2,887 (2.65%)	152 (0.14%)
1890	130,575	65,991 (50.54%)	24,751 (18.96%)	16,298 (12.48%)	15,994 (12.25%)	4,362 (3.34%)	3,000 (2.30%)	179 (0.14%)
1900	140,007	71,610 (51.15%)	25,234 (18.02%)	18,384 (13.13%)	16,567 (11.83%)	4,520 (3.23%)	3,254 (2.32%)	438 (0.31%)
1910	145,248	76,075 (52.38%)	24,897 (17.14%)	19,095 (13.15%)	16,851 (11.60%)	4,438 (3.06%)	3,353 (2.31%)	539 (0.37%)

== Subdivisions ==
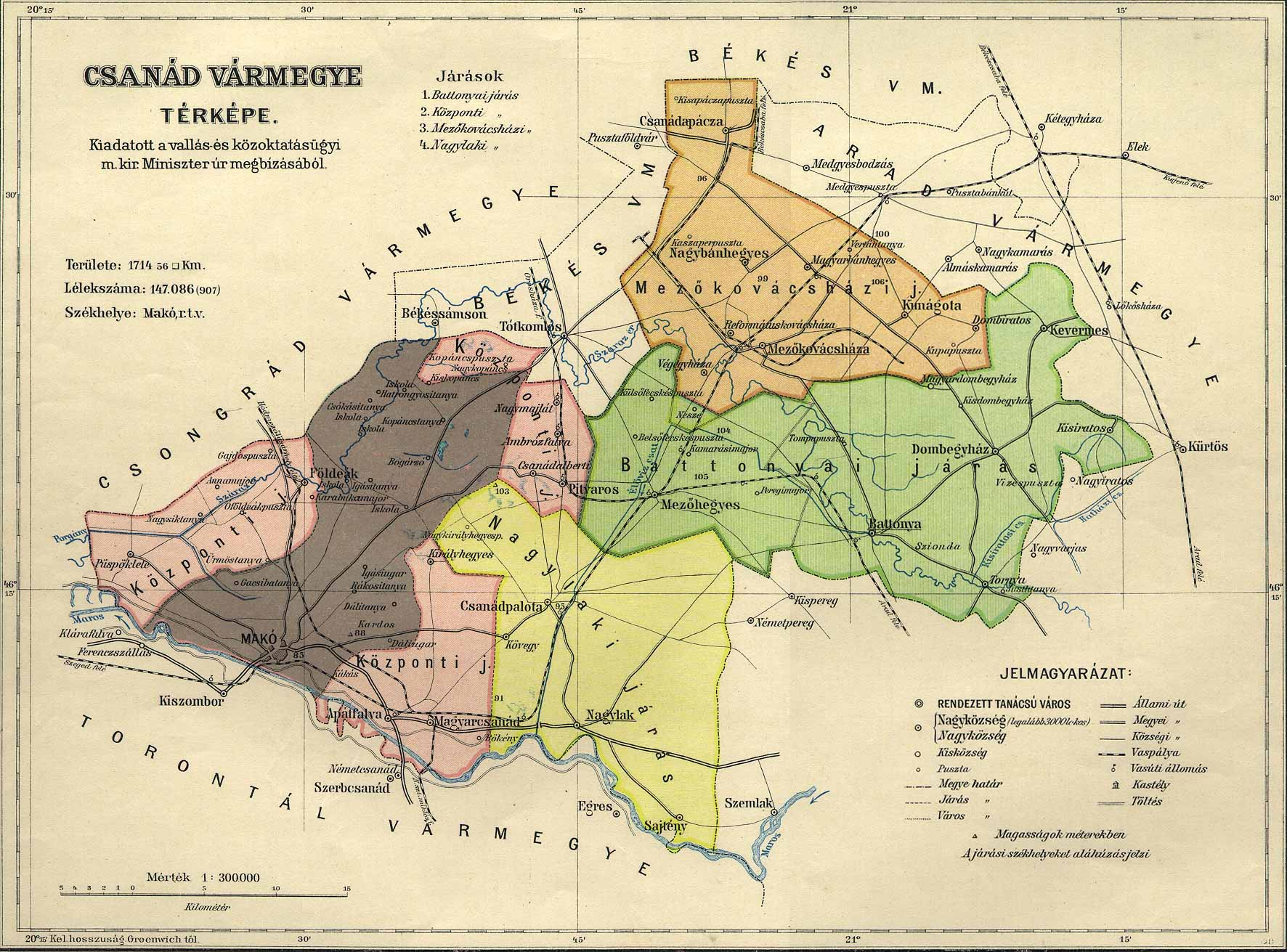

In the early 20th century, the subdivisions of Csanád county were:

Districts (járás)
District	Capital
Battonya	Battonya
Központ	Makó
Mezőkovácsháza	Mezőkovácsháza
Nagylak	Nagylak (now Nădlac)
Urban districts (rendezett tanácsú város)
Makó

The town of Nădlac is now in Romania; the other towns mentioned are now in Hungary.

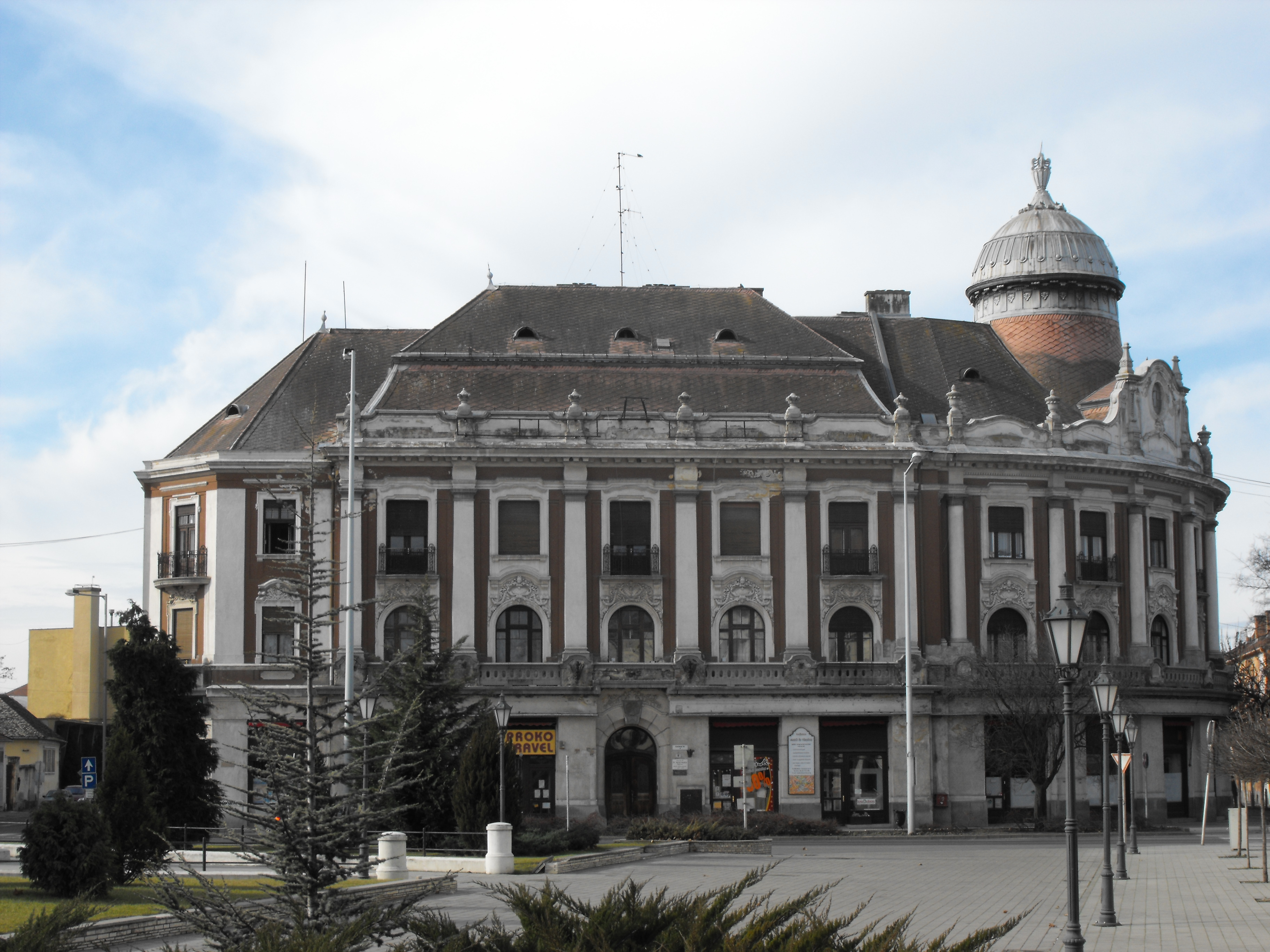
Palace of Tenants, Makó
