= Military District of Großwardein =

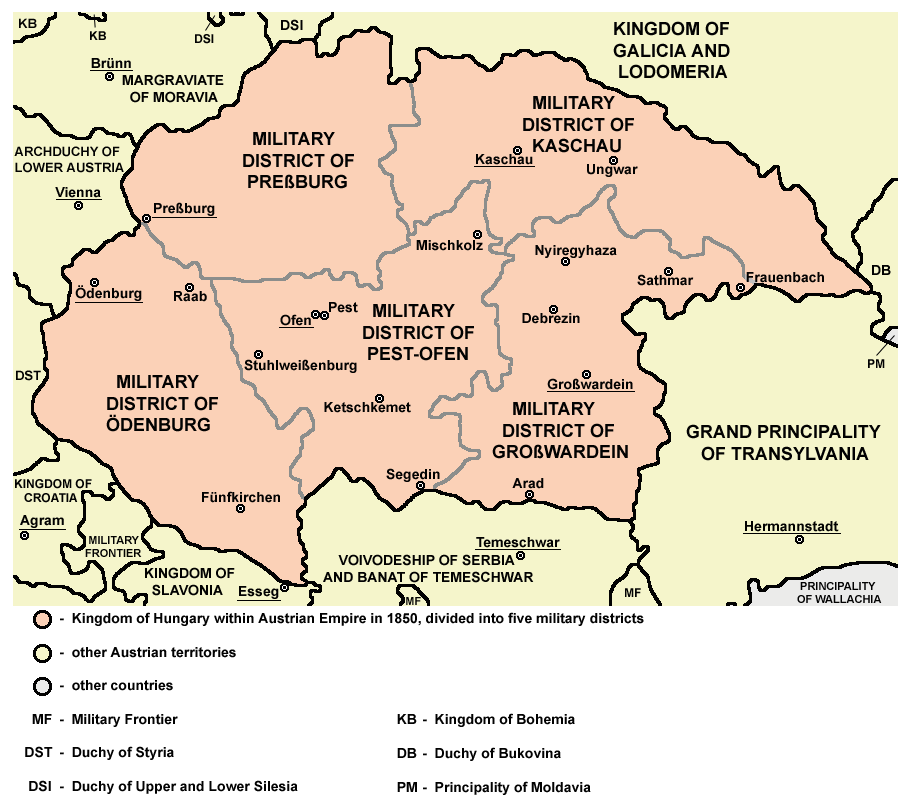
Kingdom of Hungary in 1850

The Military District of Großwardein was one of the administrative units of the Habsburg Kingdom of Hungary from 1850 to 1860. The seat of the district was Großwardein (Nagyvárad, now Oradea). It included parts of present-day Romania, Hungary, and Ukraine.

== See also ==
- Administrative divisions of the Kingdom of Hungary
