= Petty nobility =

Lower nobility classes

The minor, lesser or petty nobility is the lower nobility classes.

== Finland ==
Petty nobility in Finland is dated at least back to the 13th century and was formed by nobles around their strategic interests. The idea was more capable peasants with leader roles in the local community that were given tax exemption for taking care of services like guard duties of local strongholds. Cavalry service was not required from these petty noble families. Later on, many of these petty noble families gained full nobility ranking.

Finnish Vehkalahti is particularly noted in literature for having been an example of such petty nobility (Finnish: knaappiaateli).

== Georgia ==
The aznauri (აზნაური) were the untitled nobility of medieval and early modern Georgia, ranked below the didebuli (grandees), eristavi (dukes), tavadi (princes), and mtavari (dynastic princes), with the ruling Bagrationi dynasty being at the top. They were further divided into the mamaseulni (მამსეულნი) and the aghzeebul aznauri (აღზეებულ აზნაურს), which were the respective equivalents of the Western European uradel and brevet. By the 15th century, the aznauri were considered kmani (ქმანი), or slaves of their feudal lords, whether secular or ecclesiastic. This strict stratification was codified by King Vakhtang VI of Kartli in the 18th century, which essentially revived the Georgian feudal dynamics of the Middle Ages. Many aznauri were quite poor and lived no better than peasants, but their status carried certain privileges and exemptions from obligations. In the 19th century, following the Russian annexation of Georgia, the status of aznauri was equated to that of the (untitled) dvoryanstvo of Russia. At the time of annexation, approximately 5% of the total Georgian population belonged to the nobility in some form, including the aznauri.

== Germany ==
The Niederer Adel that held legal privileges until 1918 greater than those enjoyed by commoners, but less than those enjoyed by the Hochadel, were considered part of the lower nobility or Niederer Adel. Most were untitled, only making use of the particle von in their surnames.

== Hungary ==
Common nobility (Hungarian: Köznemesség, Latin: Nobiles) is defined as any noble, with a lower title than a baron, while those of higher rank are called Arch-nobles (főúr or főnemes). Along with High priests, these were the three estates of the medieval estate societies. They evolved from Royal servants, Castle serfs, and Armal nobles (Hungarian: Armális nemes, means a noble possessing an armális). Ten-lanced nobles were technically also part of this group. Later, in the 14th–15th centuries many have become Affluent Landed nobles (Latin: nobiles benepossessionati) who usually had 4–10 villages. Thanks to the large number of people obtaining land and/or noble title if they have achieved military success, in the 18th century, the country was also known as the Country of the Many Nobles, since the proportion of nobility among Hungarians could reach 8% (compare to 0.5% in France).

Although the privileges of the nobles and agilis (a serf married to a noblewoman) were taken away in the Revolution of 1848, they played an important role in the country's history afterwards. The fact that politics and the intelligentsia were largely made up of common and arch- nobility until the first half of the 20th century, allowed the country to undergo a stable Industrial Revolution. The Latin names are available because Latin was the language of legislation from the reign of Stephen I until the Era of Civil Reforms of Hungary. The gentry (Hungarian: Kisnemes) were part of this group but had small feudal manors (Jobbágytelek) later developed into the gentries of capitalist society. They usually only had 3 feudal manors. Their subcategories are:

- Ecclesiastical nobles (Hungarian: Egyházi nemes, Latin: preadium)
- Landed nobles (Hungarian: Birtokos nemes): nobles with at least one feudal manor
- Egytelkes nobility: also called kurialists with "kúria" meaning manor. They have only one feudal manor, on which they work by themselves.
- Armal nobles: a nobilified serf, who had land in someone elses feudal manor and had to pay taxes. This is the lowest level of nobility. They were mostly served by one or two zsellér (inquilinus).

They name hétszilvafás "having only seven plum trees" referred to impoverished nobles or armal nobles, signifying the size of their land and were considered to be below the gentry. They were also called bocskoros nemes, since the symbolic difference is that wealthy people wore boots, while poorer people wore a footwear called bocskor.

While the word közbírtok (Latin: compossessoratus) means the territory shared by the serfs, közbirtokos nemes refers to nobles who cultivate a territory together, without hierarchy. This type usually developed in the frontiers.

Due to the civic changes of the 19th century, they were either absorbed into the peasantry or the intellectual class. In the Habsburg era, their number was 125,000.

Someone above Petty nobility is called a Középnemes (Middle-noble). In Hungary, the civic transformation was led mainly by the liberal middle-nobility. The middle-nobles are defined as someone with 100–1000 holds (1 Hungarian hold equals 3586,25 m²) of land.

== Poland ==
The nobility (szlachta) of Poland included petty nobility known as drobna szlachta. These were owners of a part of a village or owning no land at all, often referred to by a variety of Polish terms such as:

- szaraczkowa – grey nobility, from their grey, woollen, uncoloured żupany
- okoliczna – local nobility, similar to zaściankowa
- zagrodowa – from zagroda, a farm, often little different from a peasant's dwelling
- zagonowa – from zagon, a small unit of land measure, hide nobility
- cząstkowa – partial, owners of only part of a single village
- panek – little pan (i.e., lordling), term used in Kaszuby, the Kashubian region, also one of the legal terms for legally separated lower nobility in late medieval and early modern Poland
- hreczkosiej – buckwheat sowers – those who had to work their fields themselves.
- zaściankowa – from zaścianek, a name for plural nobility settlement, neighbourhood nobility. Just like hreczkosiej, zaściankowa nobility would have no peasants.
- brukowa – cobble nobility, for those living in towns like townsfolk
- gołota – naked nobility, i.e., the landless. Gołota szlachta would be considered the 'lowest of the high'.
- półpanek ("half-lord"); also podpanek/pidpanek ("sub-lord") in Podolia and Ukrainian accent – a petty szlachcic pretending to be wealthy.

== Serbia ==
The nobility (vlastela) of Serbia in the Middle Ages is roughly divided into magnates (velikaši), nobility (vlastela) and petty noblemen (vlasteličići). Sometimes, the division is made between vlastela (including "great" and "small" ones) and vlasteličići.

The vlasteličići (властеличићи) were the lower nobility class of Serbia. It was a relatively numerous class of the small, warrior nobility, originating from the vojnici (warriors) from sources from the end of the 12th- and beginning of the 13th century. They held villages, with full rights, and in socioeconomic and legal terms stood below the vlastela. They had military obligations, such as joining the army individually or with a group of men (soldiers), dependent on their wealth.

== See also ==
- Conditional noble
- Landed gentry
- Polish landed gentry
- Yeoman
