= Castle warrior =

Landholder obliged to provide military services to an ispán in medieval Hungary

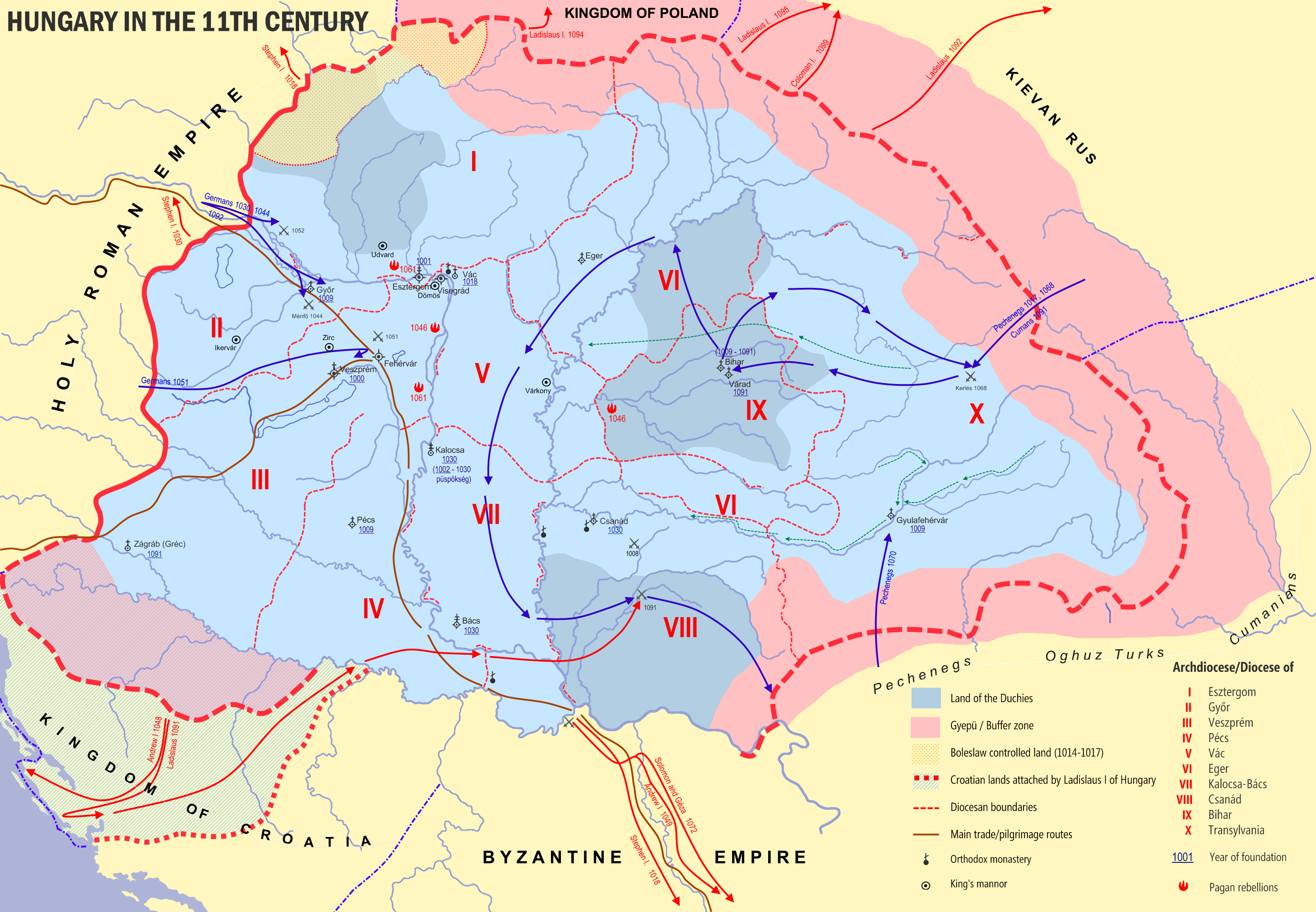
The Kingdom of Hungary at the end of the 11th century

A castle warrior or castle serf (Hungarian: várjobbágy, Latin: iobagio castri) was a landholder obliged to provide military services to the ispán or head of a royal castle district in the medieval Kingdom of Hungary. Castle warriors "formed a privileged, elite class that ruled over the mass of castle folk" (Pál Engel) from the establishment of the kingdom around 1000 AD. Due to the disintegration of the system of castle districts, many castle warriors became serfs working on the lands of private landholders in the 13th and 14th centuries; however, some of them were granted a full or "conditional noble" status.

== Origins ==
"We wish that each lord have his own warriors and no one shall try to persuade a warrior to leave his long-time lord and come to him, since this is the origin of quarrels."

— Laws of King Stephen I 1.23.

The origin of castle warriors can probably be traced back to Stephen I, the first crowned king of Hungary (1000 or 1001–1038), since most royal castles were erected during his reign. However, the settlement of armed commoners around princely fortresses may well have begun under the rule of his father, Grand Prince Géza. The jobbágy or iobagio expression, first recorded between 1127 and 1131, is of Hungarian origin, connected to the Hungarian word for "better" (jobb).

Castle warriors held landed property with a territory carved out from royal estates attached to a royal castle. In return for this landholding, they rendered military service to the ispán of the royal castle. Their property was often quite large, with a territory of about 70 hectares (170 acres).

== Flowering ==
"Castle warriors shall be preserved in the liberties established by the holy king."

— Golden Bull of 1222, article 19.

Although landholders were superior in status to castle folk, royal legislation did not treat castle warriors as full-fledged freemen. For instance, a castle warrior who had departed from his lord was "regarded as a fugitive in the same way as a runaway serf" (Pál Engel). Nevertheless, they had the right to appeal to the monarch against the ispán they were serving. Moreover, they could not be deprived of the land they owned, which passed to their children upon death. Castle warriors were also exempted from the "freemen's pennies" (denarii liberorum or liberi denarii), a tax payable by all freemen to the kings.

Castle warriors appointed by the ispáns held the chief offices of the castle districts. Thus both the heads of the "hundreds" (the basic units of the administration of a district), and the officers of the military contingent of the castle were always chosen from among their number. Likewise, the castellan was always a castle warrior in the first centuries of the kingdom. Castle warriors were eager to preserve their special status, thus they frequently sued udvarniks or castle folk who tried to take their lands or usurp their privileges. Even so, castle folk were sometimes elevated to the higher status of castle warriors.

== Disintegration ==
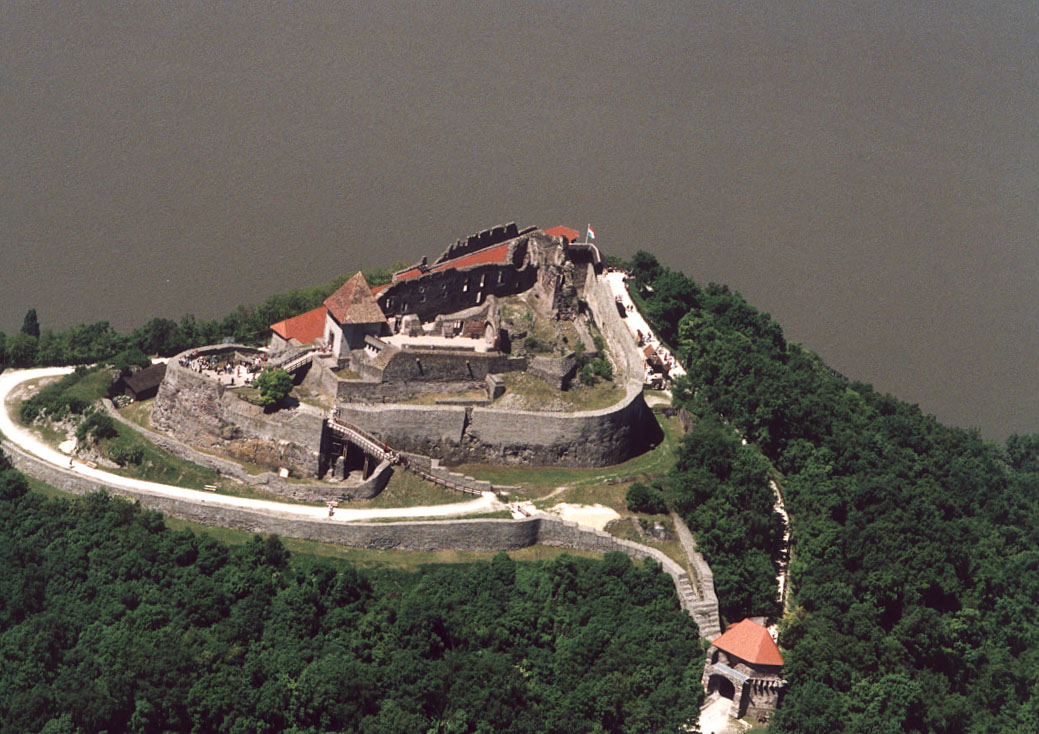
Ruins of the royal castle at Visegrád

The alienation of some pieces of "castle lands" began under the early kings of the Árpád dynasty, which initially always resulted in the resettlement of castle warriors on new lands. However, King Andrew II (1205–1235) distributed large parcels of "castle lands" (sometimes whole counties) among his followers. This resulted in a significant number of castle warriors losing their direct contact with the monarchs and becoming subject to the authority of other lords. Even the status of those who remained on castle lands were threatened from the 1370s by the emerging idea of "royal right". According to this concept, all land that was not owned by the nobility or an ecclesiastic body belonged to the monarch, thus the property rights of those who had not been ennobled could be questioned.

Nevertheless, many castle warriors were granted nobility by the monarchs in order to "remove the 'stain of ignobility' which was attached to castle service" (Martyn Rady). Even castle warriors living in castle districts distributed to private landholders could receive special collective liberties, although they were never granted "true nobility". For instance, the "noble iobaigiones of Turopolje" in Zagreb county were granted the right to elect their own judges, a right which they preserved until the 19th century.

== See also ==
- County (Kingdom of Hungary)
- Ispán
- Ministerialis
- Nobles of Turopolje
- Nobility in the Kingdom of Hungary
- Royal servant (Kingdom of Hungary)
- Ten-lanced nobles

== Sources ==
- (in Hungarian) Bán, Péter (1989). Entry várjobbágy in: Bán, Péter; Magyar történelmi fogalomtár, II. kötet: L–Zs [=Thesaurus of Terms of Hungarian History, Volume I: L–Zs]. Gondolat. ISBN 963-282-204-8.
- Curta, Florin (2006). Southeastern Europe in the Middle Ages, 500–1250. Cambridge University Press. ISBN 978-0-521-89452-4.
- (in Hungarian) Dolovai, Dorottya (2006). Entry jobbágy in: Zaicz, Gábor; Etimológiai Szótár: Magyar szavak és toldalékok eredete ("Etymological Dictionary: Origin of Hungarian Words and Affixes"); TINTA Könyvkiadó; Budapest; ISBN 963-7094-01-6.
- Engel, Pál (2001). The Realm of St Stephen: A History of Medieval Hungary, 895–1526. I.B. Tauris Publishers. ISBN 1-86064-061-3.
- Kontler, László (1999). Millennium in Central Europe: A History of Hungary. Atlantisz Publishing House. ISBN 963-9165-37-9.
- Lukačka, Ján (2011). The beginning of the nobility in Slovakia. In: Teich, Mikuláš; Kováč, Dušan; Brown, Martin D. (2011); Slovakia in History; Cambridge University Press; ISBN 978-0-521-80253-6.
- Rady, Martyn (2000). Nobility, Land and Service in Medieval Hungary. Palgrave (in association with School of Slavonic and East European Studies, University College London). ISBN 0-333-80085-0.
- The Laws of the Medieval Kingdom of Hungary, 1000–1301 (Translated and Edited by János M. Bak, György Bónis, James Ross Sweeney with an essay on previous editions by Andor Czizmadia, Second revised edition, In collaboration with Leslie S. Domonkos) (1999). Charles Schlacks, Jr. Publishers. ISBN 1-884445-29-2. OCLC 495379882. OCLC 248424393. LCCN 89-10492. OL 12153527M. (ISBN may be misprinted in the book as 88445-29-2).
- (in Hungarian) Zsoldos, Attila (1994). Entry várjobbágy in: Korai Magyar Történeti Lexikon (9–14. század) [=Encyclopedia of Early Hungarian History, 9th–14th centuries"]; Akadémiai Kiadó; Budapest; ISBN 963-05-6722-9.
