= Conditional noble =

Position in Hungarian nobility

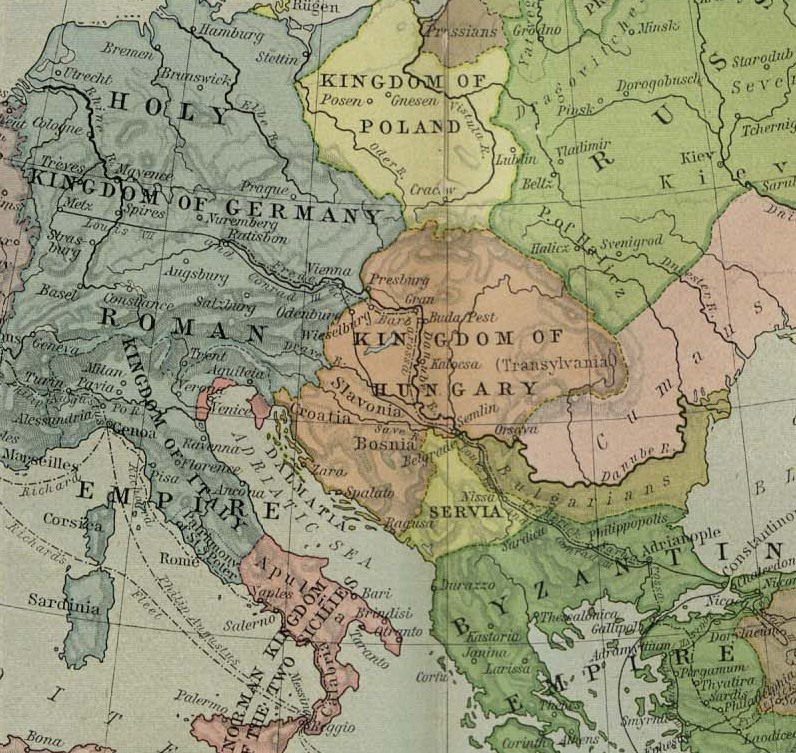
Kingdom of Hungary in the late 12th century

A conditional noble or predialist (Hungarian: prédiális nemes; Latin: nobilis praedialis; Croatian: predijalci) was a landowner in the Kingdom of Hungary who was obliged to render specific services to his lord in return for his landholding, in contrast with a "true nobleman of the realm" who held his estates free of such services. Most conditional nobles lived in the border territories of the kingdom, including Slavonia and Transylvania, but some of their groups possessed lands in estates of Roman Catholic prelates. Certain groups of conditional nobility, including the "ecclesiastic nobles" and the "nobles of Turopolje" preserved their specific status until the 19th century.

== History ==
Society in the early medieval Kingdom of Hungary was basically split into the two major groups: "freemen" (liberi) and "servants" (servi). Although legislation sharply distinguished these two categories (for instance, by prohibiting intermarriage), a wide group of "semi-free" people also existed. Furthermore, a man's legal status did not determine his economic position or occupation. Accordingly, it was not unusual for a freeman to serve in a lord's household without owning landed property nor for a servant to render military services to his lord in return for the lands he had received from him.

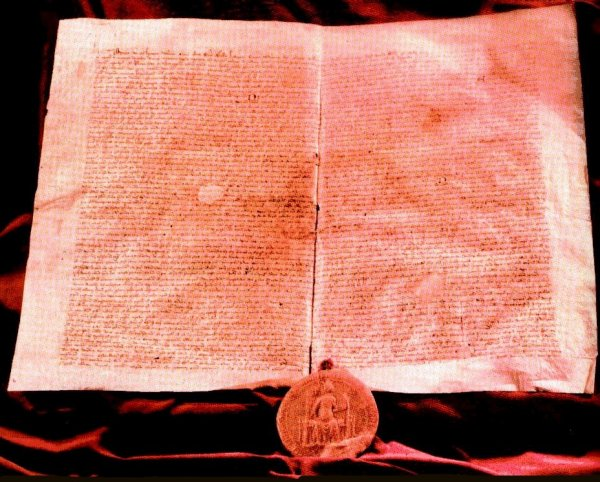
Golden Bull of 1222

Distinctions between freemen and servants started to disappear in the 12th century, but in the early 13th century new borders were formed between those who rendered military services and those who only "did peasant work" (Pál Engel) . In the former group, "castle warriors" were those who served under the command of the ispán or head of a castle district in return for the lands they held in the royal estates attached to the castle, while "royal servants" were those who owed military service directly to the monarch. Royal servants enforced the confirmation of their liberties in 1222 when King Andrew II of Hungary issued his Golden Bull. One of the principal provisions of the document stipulated that royal servants were no longer obliged to accompany the king in a military campaign abroad "unless it be at his expense".

The emerging self-consciousness of the royal servants is demonstrated by their adoption of the "noble" denomination from the 1250s, in a period when the "exact nature of noble status and the basic privileges of the noble order were definitely laid down" (Pál Engel). Their newly confirmed status distinguished "true nobleman of the realm" from those who owned their estates in return for services to be rendered to the monarch or other lords. On the other hand, some groups of castle warriors began to call themselves "the freemen of the Holy King" (liberi Sancti Regis), suggesting that their liberties could be traced back to the time of St Stephen, the first king of Hungary Furthermore, certain groups of landowners who were obliged to render services to their lords received collective liberties in the second half of the 13th century. Even new groups of landowners with similar obligations appeared in the northern Carpathian regions and other border territories of the kingdom in the same period or some decades later.

The "nobility" of conditional nobles was rather local, which is demonstrated by such denominations as "nobles of Turóc" (Turiec, Slovakia) or "nobles of Szepes" (Spiš, Slovakia) (Martyn Rady). Accordingly, they usually had their own administrative units, local meetings and courts, separate from the counties and their general assemblies. For instance, the "predialists" of the archbishopric of Esztergom had a "seat" in Vajka (Vojka nad Dunajom, Slovakia) and later in Verebély (Vráble, Slovakia). Although conditional nobles were sometimes invited to the general assemblies, their court cases were usually heard at a separate meeting. For instance, Romanian kenezes attended the general meetings of the Transylvanian noblemen, Saxons and Székelys in 1291 and 1355, but otherwise a separate meeting was convoked for them by the deputy of the voivode of Transylvania.

Conditional nobles were legally distinguished from familiares, that is, from noblemen who served a secular lord or a prelate (usually in exchange for a salary), but preserved their direct connection to the monarch. Nevertheless, in some cases familiares resigned from their "true noble" status in order to receive protection from more powerful lords, such as the ancestors of some nobles living on the estates of the bishops of Veszprém. On the other hand, conditional nobles whose estate was liberated from the obligations formerly attached to it acquired the status of "true noblemen".

== Groups of conditional nobles ==
Ecclesiastic nobles who owned landed property in the estates of the archbishops, bishops and other prelates of the realm emerged as a distinct group in the second half of the 13th century. They primarily owed military service to their lords. Ecclesiastic nobles in Slavonia sometime owned one or more villages, but those north of the river Dráva cultivated their "dwarf-holdings" themselves (Martyn Rady). The institution was abolished by decree in 1853.

The nobles of Turopolje descended from castle warriors Zagreb County in Slavonia acquired special privileges, including the right to elect their judges in the 1270s. They were also exempt from taxation. The "noble castle warriors" of Gorica and Rovišće were granted the right to be heard at the court of the ispán of the castle only when the monarch's envoy was also present, but they were to make an annual payment to the same ispán. The "nobles of Dubica" had to pay an in-kind tax (primarily marten fur) to the prior of the Knights Templar (later of the Knights Hospitaller) who received the county from King Béla IV of Hungary in 1269.

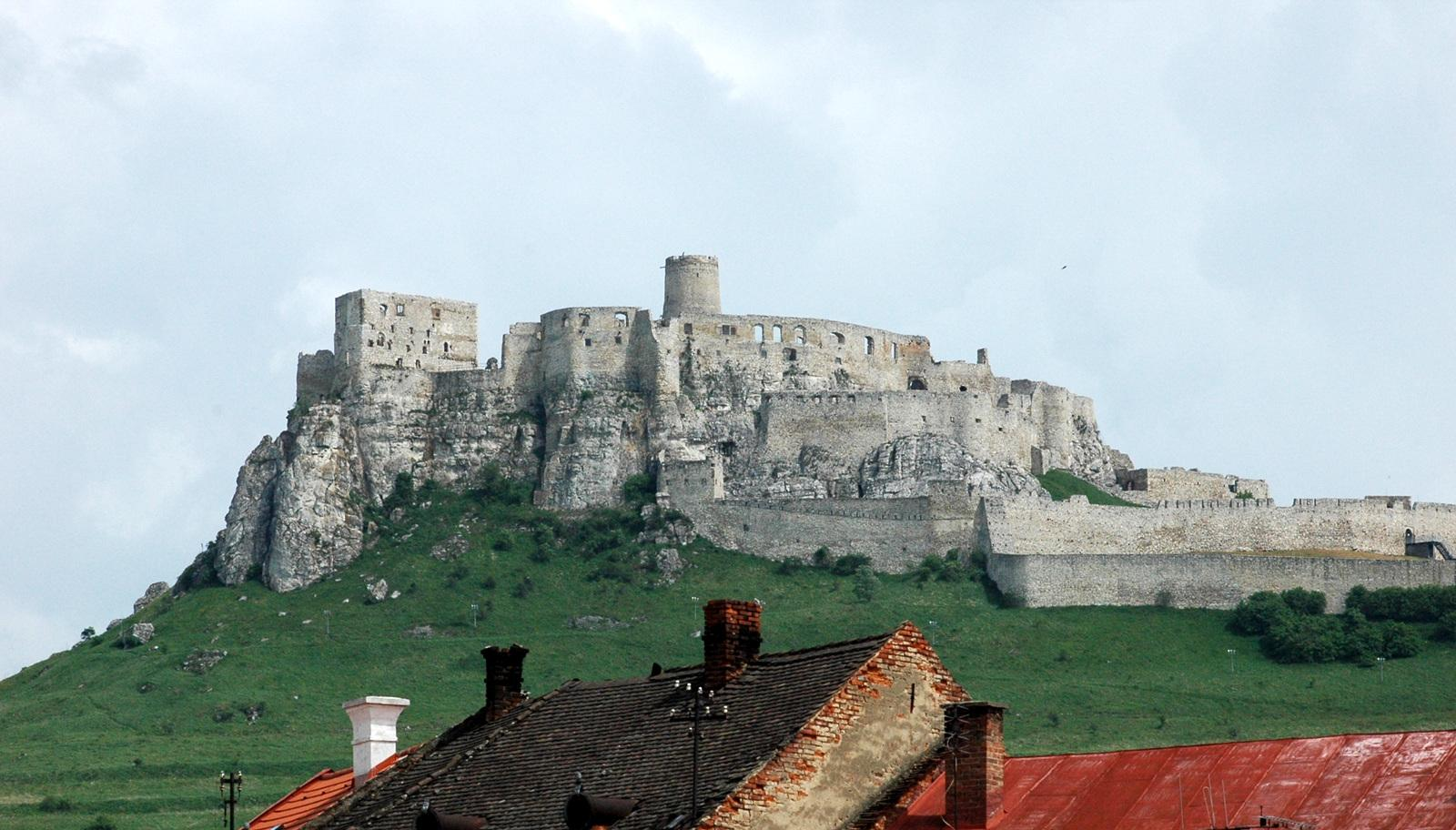
Ruins of Szepes Castle (Spišský hrad, Slovakia)

"Sons of noble castle warriors" (filii iobagionum) was the denomination of conditional nobles in many counties in Upper Hungary (now Slovakia and the Zakarpattia District of Ukraine), including Bereg (Berehovo, Ukraine), Gömör (Gemer, Slovakia), Sáros (Šariš, Slovakia) and Turóc (Turiec, Slovakia). Some of them were descendants of former border guards of possible Kabar origin, but others descended from udvarniks settled at newly erected castles under King Béla IV with the obligation to render services to the castle. Most of them had merged into the "true nobility" by the middle of the 14th century. In contrast with them, the "ten-lanced nobles of Szepes preserved their special status up until 1804.

Romanian noble knezes also formed a group of conditional nobles, since they were to render exactly specified services to the castles of the lands on which their estate was situated. They owned quite large properties (some of them inhabited by hundreds of peasants), and were organized into self-governing districts. The boyars of Fogaras enjoyed a similar status in the land of Fogaras (Făgăraș, Romania), held as a fief for decades at the turn of the 14th and 15th centuries by the princes of Wallachia. Finally, the status of the Orthodox Romanian noble voivodes who held landed property in the estates of the Roman Catholic bishops of Várad (Oradea, Romania) and Transylvania was similar to that of ecclesiastic nobles.

== See also ==
- Castle warrior
- Nobility in the Kingdom of Hungary
