= Daughters' quarter =

Hungarian land inheritance doctrine

The daughters' quarter, also known as filial quarter (Hungarian: leánynegyed; Latin: quarta filialis), was the legal doctrine that regulated the right of a Hungarian nobleman's daughter to inherit her father's property.

== Origins ==
One of the laws of the first king of Hungary, Stephen I, authorized each landowner to freely "divide his property, to assign it to his wife, his sons and daughters, his relatives or to the church" in the early 11th century. On the other hand, the aristocratic clans wanted to prevent the members of other clans from acquiring their estates through marriage with their kinswomen. Consequently, restrictions on a daughter's right to inherit her father's developed during the following centuries. Historian Martyn Rady argues that "a peculiar reading" of the Lex Falcidia in the Codex Theodosianus gave most probably rise to the formation of the new legal doctrine. Rady also proposes that churchmen must have played a preeminent role in its development, because they could recall "fathers to their duties" and specify their obligations towards their children, although the jurisdiction of ecclesiastical courts in cases involving real estates was limited.

== Development ==
The Golden Bull of 1222 contained the first reference to the daughters' quarter. The Golden Bull stated that a royal servant who died without a male heir, but had at least one daughter could only freely will three quarters of his possessions, because one quarter was due to her. The daughters' quarter did not depend of the number of daughters, because a nobleman's daughters were jointly entitled to a quarter of their father's property.

The daughters' quarter was primarily to be paid in cash or moveable goods. In 1290, a law explicitly prohibited that a nobleman's estates could be seized by another nobleman who was not a member of his clan through marrying a daughter entitled to the daughters' quarter. The amount payable to the daughters was determined in accordance with a set of rules known as "commun estimation", which always gave a value lower than the market price. If a nobleman's male heirs could not pay off his daughter in moveables, they were entitled to compensate her in land, stipulating the right to redeem it at a prearranged price.

== See also ==
- Prefection
- Hungarian nobility

== Sources ==
- Engel, Pál (2001). The Realm of St Stephen: A History of Medieval Hungary, 895–1526. I.B. Tauris Publishers. ISBN 1-86064-061-3.
- Fügedi, Erik (1998). The Elefánthy: The Hungarian Nobleman and His Kindred. Central European University Press. ISBN 963-9116-20-3.
- Rady, Martyn (2000). Nobility, Land and Service in Medieval Hungary. Palgrave. ISBN 0-333-80085-0.
- Sághy, Marianne (2006). "Eastern Europe". In Schaus, Margaret (ed.). Women and Gender in Medieval Europe: An Encyclopedia. Routledge. pp. 235–237. ISBN 978-1-138-86782-6.
