= Nobles of Turopolje =

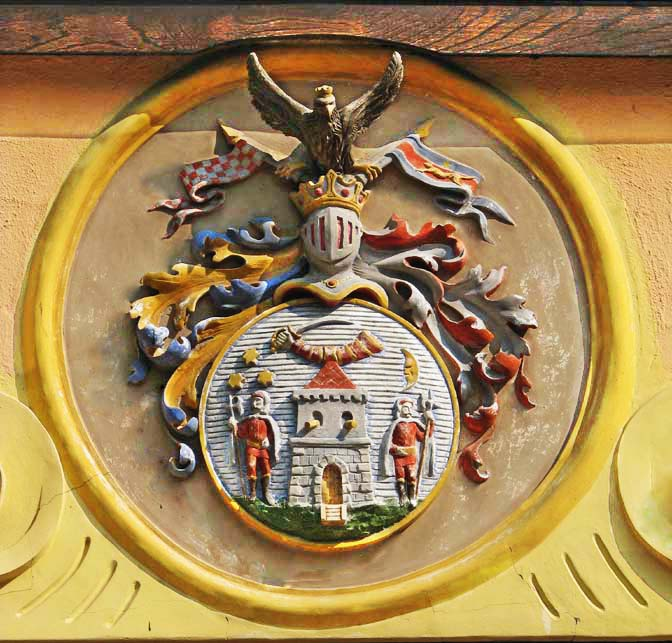
Coat-of-arms of the Turopolje district

The nobles of Turopolje or nobles of the plain (Hungarian: túrmezei nemesek, Latin: nobiles de campo) formed a group of conditional nobles in Slavonia within the Kingdom of Hungary from the second half of the 13th century to the middle of the 19th century. They lived in a self-governing "noble peasant community" and were exempted of taxation. They were partisans of the Croatian-Hungarian Party in the 1830s and 1840s. They were named after the region of Turopolje south of Zagreb.

== History ==
The nobles of Turopolje descended from castle warriors (nobiles iobagiones) of Zagreb County who received special privileges as a community in the second half of the 1270s. Thereafter they were exempted of taxation and were entitled to elect judges to hear their legal cases. Their lands were located in the territory bordered by the rivers Kupa and Sava and the Vukomerec Hills, south of Zagreb. The "sandaled nobles of Turopolje" were not "true noblemen of the realm", thus the Sabor or parliament denied their right to vote at its sessions from the 1750s. However, their right to send representatives to the Sabor was confirmed by the Court Chancellery of the Kingdom of Hungary in 1830. Thereafter they represented the interests of the central government in Slavonia, against the Illyrian Party which stated that Croatia was a separate realm, not part of the Kingdom of Hungary.

== See also ==
- Castle warrior
- Nobility in the Kingdom of Hungary
