= Freemen's pennies =

Historic Hungarian tax

The freemen's pennies or the pennies of freemen (Hungarian: szabadok dénárja; Latin: liberi denarii) was a direct tax in the Kingdom of Hungary in the 11th-13th centuries.

== Origins ==
The distribution of different types of royal revenues in the Kingdom of Hungary during the reign of the Árpádian kings is unknown, but taxes-in-kind and obligatory labour service generated significant income for the monarchs. Although the origin of direct taxation is uncertain, historians assume that a direct tax payable by all freemen was introduced by the first king of Hungary, Stephen I, who died in 1038. The Byzantine kapnikon may have influenced the new tax, which was known as freemen's pennies, because both taxes yielded the same revenue in silver. Each freemen were to pay 8 denars to the king when the tax was first mentioned in the laws of Coloman the Learned around 1100.

== Development ==
Coloman the Learned exempted all freemen who lived on their own estates of the tax. Those who lived on another man's lands were to pay the tax, but they could redeem 50% of the sum if they provided military service to the monarch or supplied him with horses and carts. According to Coloman's law, the ispáns (or heads) of the counties were responsible for the collection of the tax and they had to transport the money to Esztergom. In Esztergom, they paid two-thirds of the tax to the royal treasury, but they could retain one-third of the collected sum.

Andrew II of Hungary granted tax exemption to freemen who lived in a prelate's estates in early 1222. In the same year, the king pledged that he would not collect the freemen's pennies on the estates of royal servants (or free warriors) either.

== See also ==
- Golden Bull of 1222

== Sources ==
- Engel, Pál (2001). The Realm of St Stephen: A History of Medieval Hungary, 895–1526. I.B. Tauris Publishers. ISBN 1-86064-061-3.
- Berend, Nora; Urbańczyk, Przemysław; Wiszewski, Przemysław (2013). Central Europe in the High Middle Ages: Bohemia, Hungary and Poland, c. 900-c. 1300. Cambridge University Press. ISBN 978-0-521-78156-5.
- Blazovich, László (1999). "The origins of the Golden Bull and its most important provisions as reflected in Hungarian constitutional and legal history". In Besenyei, Lajos; Érszegi, Géza; Pedrazza Gorlero, Maurizio (eds.). De Bulla Aurea Andreae Regis Hungariae MCCXXII. Edizioni Valdonega. pp. 181–190. ISBN 88-85033-36-9.
- Weisz, Boglárka (2018). "Royal revenues in the Árpádian Age". In Laszlovszky, József; Nagy, Balázs; Szabó, Péter; Vadas, András (eds.). The Economy of Medieval Hungary. BRILL. pp. 255–264. ISBN 978-90-04-31015-5.
