= Nobles of the Church (Kingdom of Hungary) =

Group of privileged people in the Kingdom of Hungary

The "nobles of the Church" (Hungarian: egyházi nemesek, prediális nemesek; Latin: nobilis ecclesiæ, prædiales) were a group of privileged people in the Kingdom of Hungary who possessed lands on the domains of wealthier prelates and were obliged to provide military and other services to their lords.

The first references to peoples who lived on the domains of some prelates of the Kingdom of Hungary and served as horsemen in the prelates' retinue were documented already in the 11th century. By the 13th century, the retinue of several prelates consisted mainly or partly of people who were obliged to provide military service to them in exchange for the possessions they had been granted.

In the beginning, most of the soldiers in the prelates' retinues were serfs who served their lords not only as horsemen but who were employed also in their household. Several freemen joined voluntarily to the prelates' army and offered their possessions to them in order to enjoy the protection of the Church. In the first decades of the 13th century, the kings of Hungary granted the higher legal status of "horsmen serf" (Hungarian: lovasjobbágy, Latin: iobagio equites) to people serving in the household of the prelates or authorized royal servants to join to the prelates' household. From 1250, the prelates themselves received their serfs into their retinue and thus granted them a higher status in their household.

In the 11-15th century, the "nobles of the Church" not only provided military services to their lords, but they were obliged to provide some other services (e.g., they had to deliver stone, wine or reed to the prelates' household). The "nobles of the Church" endeavoured to acquire all the liberties of the "true nobles of the realm", but the prelates, supported by the kings, managed to reserve their authority over them. Nevertheless, the "nobles of the Church" became exempted from taxes payable to the kings in 1439 and they received exemption also from the tithe in 1500. In 1567, the Diet declared that the size of their weregeld and the value of their oath equaled to those of the "true nobles of the realm".

== See also ==
- Lords Spiritual
- Prince-bishop

== Sources ==
- Bónis, György: Hűbériség és rendiség a középkori magyar jogban (Vassalage and Feudality in the Medieval Hungarian Law); Osiris Kiadó, 2003, Budapest; ISBN 963-389-426-3.
- Kristó, Gyula (editor): Korai Magyar Történeti Lexikon - 9-14. század (Encyclopedia of the Early Hungarian History - 9-14th centuries); Akadémiai Kiadó, 1994, Budapest; ISBN 963-05-6722-9.
