= Ten-lanced nobles =

The ten-lanced nobles (Hungarian: tízlándzsások), also Szepes lancers, Spiš lancers, or lance-bearers of Szepes (szepesi lándzsásnemesek) were group of conditional noblemen living in the Szepes region of the Kingdom of Hungary (present-day Spiš in Slovakia). These nobles were previously part of the contingent assigned with border guard duties in the periphery of the conquered territories in the region. In the thirteenth century, some of these groups were officially integrated into the Hungarian nobility. They received their privileges from King Béla IV of Hungary in 1243. They were obliged to equip ten knights or lancers. They were not subject to the authority of the ispán (or head) of Szepes County and tax was collected from them only if the "royal servants" (or noblemen) were also required to pay it. Initially, they formed about 40 families, but their number decreased to less than 20 families by the 16th century. They lost their special status in 1804.

== Sources ==
- Bartl, Július; Čičaj, Viliam; Kohútova, Mária; Letz, Róbert; Segeš, Vladimír; Škvarna, Dušan (2002). Slovak History: Chronology & Lexicon. Bolchazy-Carducci Publishers, Slovenské Pedegogické Nakladatel'stvo. ISBN 0-86516-444-4.
- Rady, Martyn (2000). Nobility, Land and Service in Medieval Hungary. Palgrave (in association with School of Slavonic and East European Studies, University College London). ISBN 0-333-80085-0.
- Szeberényi, Gábor (2012). "Nemesi közösségek a Szepességben és Túrmezőn a 13–14. században (Szempontok a szepesi tízlándzsások és a turopoljei nemesek párhuzamának kérdéséhez) [Noble Communities in Scepusia and Turopolje in the 13th–14th Centuries (Some Aspects of Presumed Parallels in the History of Scepusian and Turopolje Nobility)]". In Bagi, Dániel; Fedeles, Tamás; Kiss, Gergely (eds.). "Köztes-Európa vonzásában". Ünnepi tanulmányok Font Márta tiszteletére (in Hungarian). Kronosz Kiadó. pp. 439–449. ISBN 978-615-5181-69-6.
- Zsótér, Rózsa (1994). "Lándzsásnemes [Ten-lanced noble]". In Kristó, Gyula; Engel, Pál; Makk, Ferenc (eds.). Korai magyar történeti lexikon (9-14. század) [Encyclopedia of the Early Hungarian History (9th-14th centuries)] (in Hungarian). Akadémiai Kiadó. pp. 393–394. ISBN 963-05-6722-9.
