= Castle folk =

Medieval class of freemen

The castle folk (Hungarian: várnép, Latin: castrenses or civis) formed a class of freemen, in the medieval Kingdom of Hungary, who were obliged to provide well-specified services to a royal castle and its ispán, or count. They were peasants living in villages formed in the lands pertaining to the royal castle and tilled their estates collectively.

== Sources ==
- Curta, Florin (2006). Southeastern Europe in the Middle Ages, 500–1250. Cambridge University Press. ISBN 978-0-521-89452-4.
- Engel, Pál (2001). The Realm of St Stephen: A History of Medieval Hungary, 895–1526. I.B. Tauris Publishers. ISBN 1-86064-061-3.
- Rady, Martyn (2000). Nobility, Land and Service in Medieval Hungary. Palgrave. ISBN 0-333-80085-0.
- Zsoldos, Attila (1994). "várnép". In Kristó, Gyula; Engel, Pál; Makk, Ferenc (eds.). Korai magyar történeti lexikon (9–14. század) [Encyclopedia of the Early Hungarian History (9th–14th centuries)] (in Hungarian). Akadémiai Kiadó. p. 716. ISBN 963-05-6722-9.
