= Royal servant =

A royal servant (Hungarian: szerviens, Latin: serviens regis) was a freeman in the Kingdom of Hungary in the 13th century who owned possession and was subordinate only to the king. The expression was documented for the first time in a charter issued in 1217. By the end of the 13th century, the use of the expression ceased, and the "royal servants" merged into the nobility of the kingdom and they formed the basis of the lesser nobility.

The "royal servants'" freedom became endangered during the reign of King Andrew II (1205-1235) who granted whole "royal counties" (i.e., all the royal domains in the counties) to his partisans. The new lords endeavoured to expand their supremacy over the "royal servants" who owned possessions in the county. However, the "royal servants'" commenced to organize themselves and they persuaded the king to issue the Golden Bull, a royal decree summarizing and confirming their following liberties:

- "royal servants" could not be arrested without a verdict;
- they were exempt from taxation;
- they were entitled to dispose of their properties in their last will in case they died without a male descendant, with the exception of the quarter due to their daughters;
- "royal servants" were exempted from the jurisdiction of the heads of the counties;
- outside the realm, they were obliged to serve in the king's army only for remuneration.

Article 2: We also wish that neither me or the kings following us would arrest a royal servant or cause his deterioration for the benefit of any of the notabilities only if an action have been taken against him and he have been sentenced in the course of ordinary legal procedure.

Article 3: Moreover, we will not levy either any tax or the servants' denarius in the royal servants' possessions. We will not stay uninvited either in their houses or in their villages. (...)

Article 4: If a royal servant dies without a male descendant, one fourth of his possessions shall pass to his daughters, but he will be entitled to dispose of his possessions' other parts as he pleases. And if he dies without expressing his last will, they will be owned by his next kinsmen, and if he did not have any relatives, his possessions would pass to the king.

Article 5: The heads of counties shall not make a judgement in the royal servants' possessions only if the case relates to money or tithe.

Article 7: And if the king wants to wage war outside the kingdom, royal servants shall not be obliged to follow him only for the king's money; and when he has returned, he shall not levy penalty of war on the royal servants. And if the enemy attacks the kingdom with military forces, they all will be obliged to go there. (...)

— The Golden Bull (Act of 1222)

== See also ==
- Castle warriors

== Sources ==
- Bán, Péter (editor): Magyar Történelmi Fogalomtár; Gondolat, Budapest, 1989; ISBN 963-282-202-1.
- Kristó, Gyula (editor): Korai Magyar Történeti Lexikon - 9-14. század (Encyclopedia of the Early Hungarian History - 9-14th centuries); Akadémiai Kiadó, 1994, Budapest; ISBN 963-05-6722-9.
- Kristó, Gyula: Magyarország története - 895-1301 (The History of Hungary - 895-1301); Osiris Kiadó, 1998, Budapest; ISBN 963-379-442-0.
