= Michael Csák =

Hungarian nobleman

Ispán of Veszprém
- Reign: 1272
- Predecessor: Benedict Balog
- Successor: Atyusz Hahót
- Died: after 1277
- Noble family: gens Csák
- Father: Peter

Michael from the kindred Csák (Hungarian: Csák nembeli Mihály; died after 1277) was a Hungarian nobleman and soldier in the 13th century, who served as ispán of Veszprém County in 1272. He actively participated in various military conflicts in the 1260s and 1270s.

== Family ==
Michael was born into the Dobóc (or Orbova) branch of the gens (clan) Csák as the son of Peter. He had three brothers, Dominic, who pursued career in politics resulting the ascendance of their branch, Simon and possibly Beers. Michael had no known descendants.

== Career ==
While Dominic entered court service and was involved in national governance, Michael excelled in a military career since the 1260s. Both of them belonged to the accompaniment of Duke Stephen, who governed Transylvania since 1260. When the tense relationship between Stephen and his father King Béla IV of Hungary sparked into a civil war at the turn of 1264 into 1265, Michael was actively involved in military operations. He was among the few dozen defenders in the siege of the fort of Feketehalom (today Codlea, Romania) during the war. Michael suffered a life-threatening injury in the siege, when Stephen led his remaining garrison out of the fort to fight the besiegers, while the duke's rescue army had arrived. Thereafter, Michael participated in the decisive Battle of Isaszeg in early March 1265. Despite the victory, Dominic and Michael turned against their lord Stephen and fled to the royal court of Béla IV in late 1266. The brothers were involved in lawsuit with the Vaja kindred over their acquired estates in Valkó and Syrmia counties. The paterfamilias Dominic reached an out-of-court settlement with their opponents with the consent of his brothers, Michael, Simon and Beers in 1267.

Michael's military career reached its peak in 1268, when the Serbian king Stefan Uroš I invaded the Duchy of Macsó, the southern province of the Kingdom of Hungary, taking advantage of the internal conflict between Béla IV and Stephen. Michael was part of the Hungarian reinforcements marched into the south in order to liberate the province, led by his distant relative Stephen Csák. During the battle, which resulted the decisive victory of the Hungarians, Michael bravely fought and captured two important Serbian barons: an unidentified son-in-law of King Stefan Uroš and a son of the monarch's treasurer in their full armor and with their horses in the sight of Duke Béla of Macsó. The duke's mother Duchess Anna of Macsó also testified his bravery in the royal court. Following the war, Michael agreed with the Serbs in a ransom of 800 marks to release the two captured lords. He received 300 marks in cash, while the remaining amount (500 marks = 3,000 Florentine florins) was covered by a gem reliquary cross (staurotheke), which allegedly contained pieces of wood from the True Cross upon which Jesus was crucified. King Béla IV and Queen Maria Laskarina intended to buy the relic from Michael, who thus requested landholdings from the royal couple, instead of an amount of money. Béla donated landed estates to him in Somogy County in April 1269, including Erdőcsokonya, Kisvid, Som, Kovácsi and Nyim. In addition, he was also granted some possessions in Fejér County. King Béla referred to Michael as his faithful "royal youth" (Latin: iuvenis noster) in the 1269 document.

Following the death of Béla IV in May 1270, Stephen V ascended the Hungarian throne without difficult. In order to eliminate threat from the Kingdom of Bohemia and to stabilize of the domestic political situation, the newly crowned king reconciled with the former partisans of his late father, including Dominic and Michael Csák. On 15 June 1270, in this spirit, Stephen V transcribed Béla's donation letter from the previous year (9 April 1269) to Michael, in which he confirmed him in the previous donation concerning Erdőcsokonya, but his diploma omit to mention Béla's other donations in Somogy County to Michael. In addition, the king extended the donation to Dominic and his descendants too. He also exempted Dominic, Michael and their descendants from the jurisdiction of the palatine and other barons, and placed them directly under the king's court or the judge royal. Both Dominic and Michael remained supporters of the king for the remaining part of his short reign. When Ottokar II of Bohemia invaded Hungary in the spring of 1271, they fought against the Bohemians in the northern part of the county. Both of them were present in the decisive battle on the Rábca River on 21 May 1271, when Stephen routed Ottokar's army. Michael was first styled as ispán of Veszprém County in June 1272. Because of Michael's advanced military service, Dominic and Michael were granted Karos in Zala County in August 1272, shortly before Stephen's death. He still held the office of ispán of Veszprém County in November 1272, after King Ladislaus IV ascended the Hungarian throne.

During the turbulent years of the first phase of feudal anarchy (1272–1277), Michael was also a sufferer and exploiter of the chaotic period. During the attack of the rival baronial group in the winter of 1275, the Geregyes – Nicholas and Geregye – along with their relative Roland, son of Mark (all of them belonged to the Csáks' rivals) plundered and looted Michael's villages and estates, while his churches were invaded and robbed. A few months later, Dominic and Michael temporarily became disgraced due to their involvement in the attack and sack of the Diocese of Veszprém in the spring of 1276, led by their relative Peter Csák. According to Queen Elizabeth's charter from that year, both of them actively participated in the "horrible attack", therefore she confiscated the village Karos from them and handed over the possession to the bishopric of Veszprém as a compensation. During the Geregyes' attack in 1275, the aforementioned diploma of Béla IV from 1269 was lost or destroyed (it survived only in a 1275 transcript), as a result Michael requested Ladislaus IV to confirm and transcribe his grandfather's former donations to him in Somogy and Fejér counties. Vice-chancellor Demetrius demonstrated the authenticity of Béla's previous donation, since Demetrius also bore the office and personally handed over the letter of donation to Michael at that time. Ladislaus IV confirmed the donations in July 1277. This is the last mention of Michael, he died sometime thereafter.

== Sources ==
- Gutheil, Jenő (1979). Az Árpád-kori Veszprém [Veszprém During the Age of Árpáds] (in Hungarian). Veszprém Megyei Levéltár. ISBN 9630111594.
- Karácsonyi, János (1901). A magyar nemzetségek a XIV. század közepéig. I. kötet [The Hungarian genera until the middle of the 14th century, Vol. 1] (in Hungarian). Hungarian Academy of Sciences.
- Popović, Danica (2019). "On Two Lost Medieval Serbian Reliquaries: The Staurothekai of King Stefan Uroš I and Queen Helen". Balcanica (50): 39–55. doi:10.2298/BALC1950039P. hdl:21.15107/rcub_dais_7795. S2CID 226868916.
- Zsoldos, Attila (2007). Családi ügy: IV. Béla és István ifjabb király viszálya az 1260-as években [A family affair: The Conflict between Béla IV and Junior King Stephen in the 1260s] (in Hungarian). História, MTA Történettudományi Intézete. ISBN 978-963-9627-15-4.
- Zsoldos, Attila (2011). Magyarország világi archontológiája, 1000–1301 [Secular Archontology of Hungary, 1000–1301] (in Hungarian). História, MTA Történettudományi Intézete. ISBN 978-963-9627-38-3.

Michael Genus Csák Born: ? Died: after 1277
Political offices
| Preceded by Benedict Balog | Ispán of Veszprém; 1272 | Succeeded by Atyusz Hahót |
