= Finta Aba =

Hungarian lord

Palatine of Hungary
- Reign: 1280–1281
- Predecessor: Matthew Csák
- Successor: Peter Csák
- Died: 1287
- Noble family: gens Aba
- Spouse: unknown
- Issue: Klara
- Father: David I

Finta from the kindred Aba (Hungarian: Aba nembeli Finta; died 1287) was a Hungarian lord, who served as Palatine of Hungary from 1280 to 1281. He is best known for capturing King Ladislaus IV of Hungary in early 1280.

== Family ==
Finta was born into the Széplak branch of the prestigious and fairly extended Aba kindred as the son of ispán David Aba. He also had at least three siblings: Palatine Amadeus Aba, who became a powerful oligarch at the turn of the 13th and 14th centuries, Judge royal Peter Aba and a sister who was engaged to Simon Kacsics from the Zagyvafő branch in 1290. Finta had a daughter, Klara, who married Julius III Kán, ispán of Baranya County (also known as Julius Siklósi) and died before 1300.

== Career ==
In 1277–1278, when declared to be of age, Ladislaus IV of Hungary successfully defeated and eliminated the aspirations of power of Roland, son of Mark and the entire Geregye clan led by former Voivode Nicholas Geregye and ispán Geregye II Geregye. The latter one was executed for high treason before September 1278. This was the first time when the central royal power participated actively in dismantling of a local authority following the anarchic situation since 1272. Finta took a major role in the fights against the Geregyes; as a result, he was donated the whole Ung County by King Ladislaus IV later in 1279. Although the king's expedition against the Kőszegi family was unsuccessful, the major opponent Csák clan compromised with the Gutkeleds (Joachim Gutkeled was killed not long before) who immediately broke the alliance with the Kőszegis in the summer of 1278.

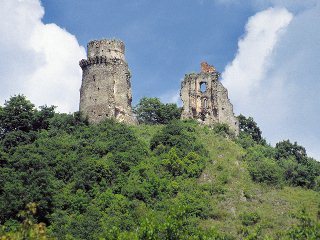
Szalánc Castle

Following this agreement, a new baronial government formed where the eight "great officers of state" were held by four members of Csák kindred, two from the Gutkeleds, Jakó Kaplon and Finta Aba, who became Voivode of Transylvania replacing Nicholas Pok. However, the activity of papal legate Philip, Bishop of Fermo, demolished the fragile peace, when he excommunicated Ladislaus IV and placed Hungary under interdict because of the pagan Cumans' growing influence. The barons were divided in the support of King Ladislaus the Cuman. Tensions escalated when the king decided to arrest and imprison Philip of Fermo in early January 1280. The thoughtless act resulted in Hungary being confronted with the whole of Christian Europe and the Church.

Presumably under the leadership of Palatine Matthew Csák, the barons decided to imprison Ladislaus IV. Sometime after 17 January 1280, when the king stayed in Transylvania, Finta Aba captured Ladislaus and handed him over to Roland Borsa, a long-time ally of the Csáks who held Ladislaus in custody. Gyula Kristó, Jenő Szűcs and other historians say that Finta was the head of the conspiracy; however, Attila Zsoldos argued that Finta was appointed Palatine only months later replacing Matthew Csák. In less than two months, both the legate and the king were set free and Ladislaus took a new oath to enforce the Cuman laws and also forgave his captors.

When Ladislaus IV again felt himself strong enough in the summer of 1280, he deposed Matthew Csák and replaced him with Finta Aba, proving that the lord was only executive in Matthew's conspiracy. The new Voivode Stephen, son of Tekesh was a strong ally of Finta. Besides the position of Palatine, Finta also functioned as ispán of Somogy and Sopron Counties in 1280, and also ex officio Judge of the Cumans.

== Uprising against Ladislaus ==
By mid-1281, Ladislaus decided to raise the rival baronial group when the excommunicated Ivan Kőszegi was elected Palatine, replacing Peter Csák, who succeeded Finta shortly before. Voivode Stephen, son of Tekesh, and Judge royal Peter Aba, brother of Finta, also lost their positions. Following royal charters refer to Finta as "disloyal", "traitor", "domineering", "impenitent" and "perfidious" who caused "much suffering to the realm". As Peter Aba was appointed Master of the treasury and there is no mention of Amadeus Aba, it is likely to be declared that only Finta rebelled against the king and not the whole Aba clan. The revolt caused an internal conflict; Ladislaus launched a campaign against him and seized his castles (e.g. Gede, Szalánc) in the summer of 1281, the royal army was also involved by Kőszegi forces.

Ladislaus was not able to definitively defeat Finta until the end of the year as there were also battles and sieges at Northeast Hungary in the next year and the Sárospatak Castle was also under siege which was probably defended by Stephen, son of Tekesh, where he was ispán. However, the Cuman rebellion in 1282 appeared as a much more serious problem. Nevertheless, Finta Aba lost all of his political influence and died in 1287.

== Sources ==
- Engel, Pál (2001). The Realm of St Stephen: A History of Medieval Hungary, 895-1526. I.B. Tauris Publishers. ISBN 1-86064-061-3.
- (in Hungarian) Markó, László (2006). A magyar állam főméltóságai Szent Istvántól napjainkig – Életrajzi Lexikon ("The High Officers of the Hungarian State from Saint Stephen to the Present Days – A Biographical Encyclopedia") (2nd edition); Helikon Kiadó Kft., Budapest; ISBN 963-547-085-1.
- Treptow, Kurt W. & Popa, Marcel (1996). Historical Dictionary of Romania. Scarecrow Press, Inc. ISBN 0-8108-3179-1.
- (in Hungarian) Zsoldos, Attila (1997). "Téténytől a Hód-tóig. Az 1279 és 1282 közötti évek politikatörténetének vázlata." In: Történelmi Szemle, Vol. XXXIX Issue 1. pp. 69–98.; ISSN 0040-9634.
- (in Hungarian) Zsoldos, Attila (2011). Magyarország világi archontológiája, 1000–1301 ("Secular Archontology of Hungary, 1000–1301"). História, MTA Történettudományi Intézete. Budapest. ISBN 978-963-9627-38-3

Finta Genus Aba Born: ? Died: 1287
Political offices
Preceded by Nicholas Pok	Voivode of Transylvania; 1278–1280	Succeeded by Stephen, son of Tekesh
Preceded by Matthew Csák	Palatine of Hungary; 1280–1281	Succeeded by Peter Csák
