= Paul Geregye =

Hungarian baron

- Lord of Berettyó

Judge royal
- Reign: 1241; 1248–1254
- Predecessor: Andrew, son of Serafin (1st term); Roland Rátót (2nd term)
- Successor: Ladislaus Kán (1st term); Henry Kőszegi (2nd term)
- Born: c. 1206
- Died: 1270 or 1271
- Noble family: gens Geregye
- Spouse: N Győr
- Issue: Agnes; Nicholas; Stephen; Geregye II; Eth II
- Father: Eth I

Paul from the kindred Geregye (Hungarian: Geregye nembeli Pál; c. 1206 – 1270 or 1271) was an influential Hungarian baron following the Mongol invasion of 1241. He served as Judge royal twice during the reign of Béla IV of Hungary.

== Family ==
Paul was born around 1206 into the gens Geregye as the son of Eth I, wo was Voivode of Transylvania earlier in 1200. He also had a younger brother, Geregye I, the ancestor of the Egervári family from Vas County.

Paul married to an unidentified granddaughter of Palatine Pat Győr around 1228 (while her sister was the wife of Stephen Csák, Ban of Severin). Historian Attila Zsoldos considers Pat was among those noblemen, who were plotting to dethrone Andrew and crown his eldest son, the eight-year-old Béla in 1214. Following that he became disgraced in the royal court and was among the young Béla's supporters. The marriage between Paul and Pat's granddaughter was due to strengthen the relationship between Béla's partisans. They had four sons and a daughter. The eldest one Nicholas held important secular functions, while his younger brothers (Stephen, Geregye II and Eth II) supported his political ambition in Transylvania. Paul's only daughter Agnes became a nun at the Margaret Island following her husband's death. In 1276, Agnes claimed that she was approximately 50 years old in that year; presumably she was the couple's first-born child. According to the sources, Geregye and Eth were much more younger than their elder siblings (both Nicholas and Stephen reached adulthood by 1256); historian Attila Zsoldos considers it is possible that Paul married twice and the younger sons were born from his second marriage. A relative of Paul's wife, Conrad Győr filed a lawsuit against his second cousins, the wives of Paul Geregye and Stephen Csák, disputing the legitimacy of their ownership over Ilsva and Rahóca in Baranya County, respectively. In September 1258, Béla IV rejected Conrad's accusations citing the two lady were granted the aforementioned possessions via daughters' quarter during their wedding approximately thirty years ago.

He inherited the kindred's possession from his father near the border of Vas and Zala County, where the Sárvíz stream flows to the Zala. Along with his nephew Barnabas, Paul also possessed inherited lands in the northeast part of Bihar County in Transylvania, the so-called "Berettyó lordship", which was composed of the villages Micske (Mișca), Poklostelek (Poclușa de Barcău), Láz (Chișlaz), Dienes and Sáncsi (present-day the territory belongs to the commune Chișlaz in Romania).

== Béla's partisan ==
He was first mentioned by contemporary records in 1224 as a supporter of Duke Béla. Paul and the young prince were contemporaries of the same age. He belonged to the group of so-called "royal youth" (Hungarian: királyi ifjak, Latin: iuvenis noster), who supported the monarchs and took a leading role in royal military campaigns. When Andrew II of Hungary re-installed his son Béla as the Duke of Slavonia, Béla launched a campaign against Domald of Sidraga, a rebellious Dalmatian nobleman, and captured Domald's fortress at Klis. Paul Geregye also participated in this campaign, he defeated and captured Boyzen, Domald's brother and following the recapture of Klis, he also imprisoned Domald himself and rescued twelve noblemen. In 1229, Paul also fought in the unsuccessful campaign against the Principality of Galicia. Duke Frederick II of Austria invaded the western parts of Hungary in 1230, in response Béla launched a counterblow against the Duke. Paul participated in the recaptures of Borostyánkő and Lánzsér Castles (today Bernstein and Burgruine Landsee in Austria, respectively), and also destroyed the dams erected by the Austrians which had blocked the flow of Mur to overflow the surrounding villages. Historian Veronika Rudolf connected Paul's latter heorism to the clashes along the Hungarian–Styrian border in 1233. In 1231, King Andrew II led another campaign against Galicia, Paul participated in the siege of Galicia too, when the king successfully restored his youngest son, Andrew, to the Galician throne.

Following Andrew II's death, Béla IV ascended the Hungarian throne in autumn 1235. His former faithful servants during his ducal period were elevated to the highest courtly positions, in parallel with dismissals and imprisonments of Andrew's loyal barons. Paul was appointed ispán of Fejér County by Béla IV in 1238, he held the office until 1241. According to Gábor Béli and László Markó, he served in that capacity until May 1242. Meanwhile, the Mongols invaded Hungary and annihilated Béla's army in the Battle of Mohi on 11 April 1241. There is no mention that Paul had participated in the catastrophic battle. Nevertheless, Judge royal Andrew, son of Serafin was killed in the battlefield and Béla IV, who managed to escape to Dalmatia, was installed Paul Geregye as his successor.

== After the Mongol invasion ==
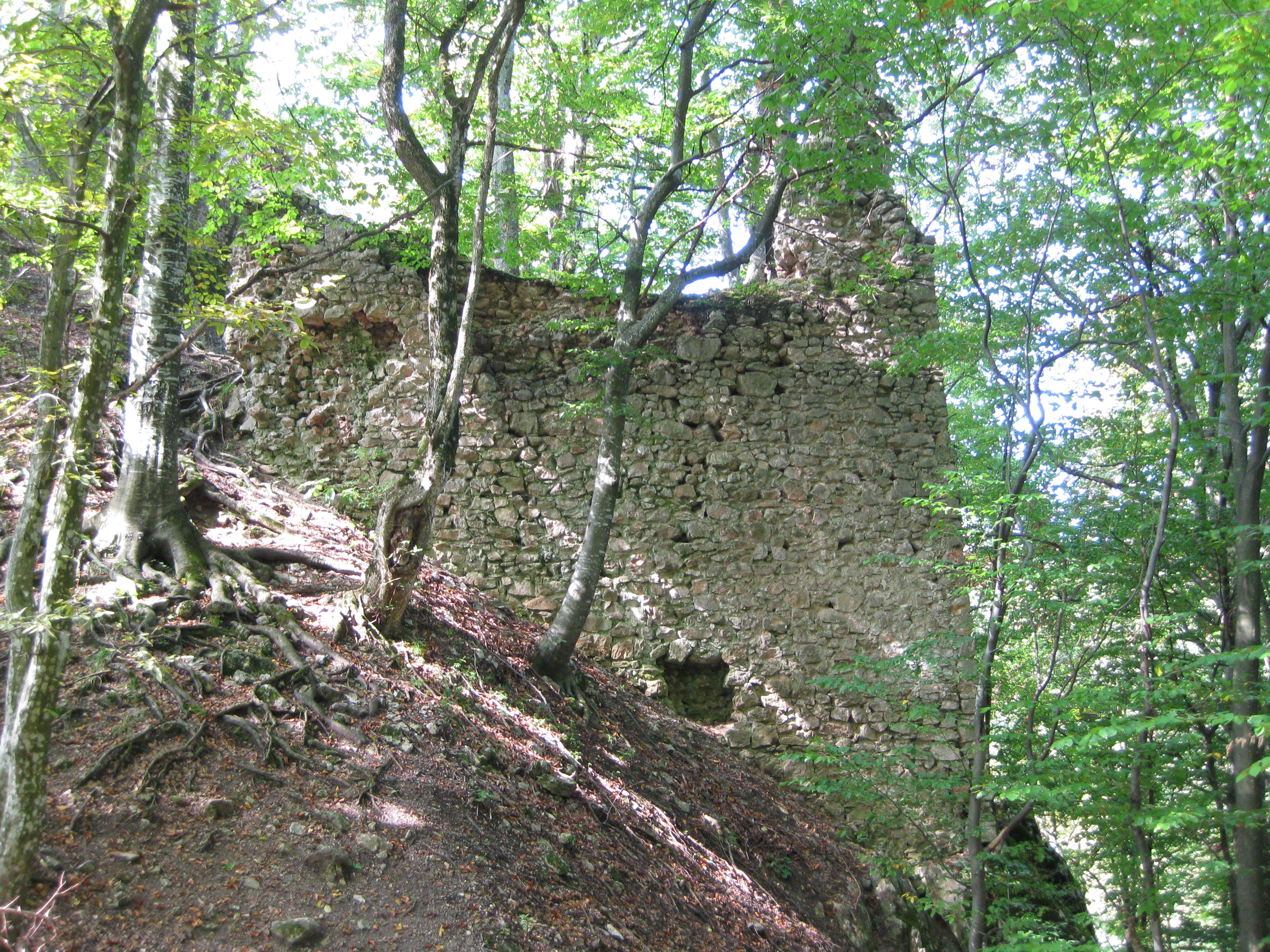
Sólyomkő Castle

In the winter of 1241–42, King Béla commissioned him with the protection of the Danube border. Paul established a defensive line along the river with his troops. Paul performed exceptional military and organizational skill during the process, his line of defense aimed to protect the right bank of the river and to cover the route of refugees to the westernmost part of Hungary. However the Mongols led by Kadan crossed the frozen river and invaded Transdanubia thus Paul was gradually forced to retreat. Thereafter, Paul Geregye joined Béla's retinue and fled to Dalmatia. Following the withdrawal of Mongols in May 1242, Paul was responsible for recovering the Tiszántúl region, he served in this capacity until June 1246. He crossed the Danube in early 1243, "before any other noblemen of the realm", according to King Béla's charter. He marched into the central parts of the kingdom, which suffered severe devastation and where the "law and order were a distant memory". Without holding any specific office, Paul acted as the highest military and administrative leader of the region whose task was to gradually restore royal power, extending it to areas east of the Tisza in the wake of the withdrawal of the Mongols. During this time, Paul restored order, reorganized administration and the structure of noble properties, annihilated outlaw groups and gathered and resettled the dispersed and fleeing population. He also oversaw the reopening of the Transylvanian salt mines and directed the reconstruction work in the region. According to historian Jenő Szűcs, Paul also invited the Cumans to return to Hungary after their forced exodus on the eve of the Mongol invasion. For his meritorious and faithful service, he was appointed ispán of Szolnok County in or sometime before 1245 and held the dignity until 1247.

Paul participated in the Battle of the Leitha River on 15 June 1246, where Béla IV defeated the Austrian troops and Frederick the Quarrelsome was also killed. Paul severely injured in the battle and was captured by the enemy alongside his seven companions. The Austrians kept them prisoners until Paul paid 1,000 marks as ransom for all of them. Following this Paul returned to Hungary. Around September 1248, he was installed Judge royal for the second time. He held the dignity for six years, until April 1254, when he was replaced by Henry I Kőszegi from the gens Héder. In this capacity, Paul was entrusted by his king with the task of reconstituting the domains of the royal fortresses throughout the entire kingdom in 1248. He also served as ispán of Zala County between 1248 and 1255.

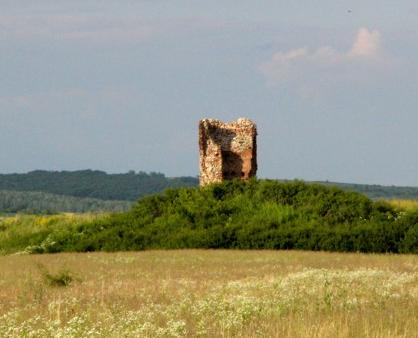
Adorján Castle

By 1236, he already possessed Jenő (today Ineu, Romania) along the northern bank of Sebes-Körös (Crișul Repede) river. On 21 January 1249, Béla IV donated Zsadány, Okány, Kér (Cheriu) and Bölcsi across the Körös to Paul. He also received Berettyó (after this he was also titled as "Lord of Berettyó"), Szaránd and Almás among others. In Kraszna County, he also became owner of Zovány, Valkó and Nagyfalu. Accordingly, he was granted ten, four and three estates in Bihar, Szolnok and Kraszna counties, respectively. The majority of his acquisitions laid in the region Kalotaszeg (Țara Călatei) – Bikal (Bicălatu), Füld (Fildu), Almás (Almașu) –, southeast of Várad (present-day Oradea in Romania) – Kér (Cheriu), Szaránd (Sărand), Hájó (Haieu) – and southwestern part of Bihar County (the aforementioned Berettyó lordship). Paul was also granted Gyarak (Ghiorac). In Szolnok County, Paul became the owner of Kozárvár (Cuzdrioara), Tűrtő (near present-day Mezőtúr) and a large portion in the town Szolnok. In Kraszna County, he was granted Zovány (Zăuan), Nagyfalu (Nușfalău) and Valkó (Văleni), which laid along the border with Bihar County. According to historian Attila Zsoldos, no logical system can be discovered for property acquisitions: Béla IV donated all freely donable property to Paul in the aforementioned counties. Following the Mongol invasion, Béla IV abandoned the ancient royal prerogative to build and own castles, promoting the erection of nearly 100 new fortresses by the end of his reign. When retired from politics, Paul built Sólyomkő (now in Aleșd, Romania) and Adorján Castle, and presumably the fort of Valkó.

== Fall from grace ==
Despite the fact that he was one of the largest beneficiaries of Béla's donation policy since the 1240s, Paul also acquired lands and estates by means of violence. His troops seized the landholdings of the neighboring Csanád clan along the Sebes-Körös: Telegd, Szabolcs, Sonkolyos and Bertény with its royal customs (today Tileagd, Săbolciu, Șuncuiuș and Birtin in Romania, respectively). This event occurred around 1255. In the next year, Béla obliged him to return the acquired lands to the original owners, retaining a half part of the custom at Berény. According to the verdict, Paul and his sons had to swear at the tomb of St. Ladislaus in Várad to return the occupied lands. Around the same time, Paul became disgraced in the royal court and never held any dignities nor positions anymore. According to Szűcs, Paul was the only known baron before the 1260s civil war period during the reign of Béla IV, who has fallen out of the grace of the monarch. Szűcs considered Paul retired to his estates in Bihar County because of his resentment, where he began to build his large-scale and coherent lordship as one of the forerunners of the late 13th-century oligarchic domains.

Originally, his lands were located in three larger dispositions within the region, which he intended to connect with new acquisitions, becoming the undisputed lord in Tiszántúl. In 1265, he exchanged his estates in Zala County to his nephew's lands in Tiszántúl (mainly in Bihar County), thus the Gerenye clan split into two branches (Paul's family and the Egervár branch which remained landowners in Western Hungary). Shortly thereafter Barnabas Geregye accused his uncle, Paul of having him expelled from his newly acquired possessions by force. Béla IV launched an investigation and justified the charges against Paul. However, Paul refused to return the estates to his relative. The chapter of Vasvár conducted for a second inspection in the early 1270s, during the reign of Stephen V of Hungary, when it reached the same conclusion. According to a 1278 charter, Paul and his sons unlawfully possessed the land of Székelyhíd (today Săcueni, Romania). The document narrates that the property belonged to the Gutkeled clan until when Paul seized the village and its surrounding lands not long after the Mongol invasion. Paul also occupied Gáborján from the Gyovad clan in the same way.

When his only daughter Agnes became a nun and donated her inherited lands to the Dominican monastery at Margaret Island in 1270, Paul was still referred as a living person. Paul Geregye died either in 1270 or 1271, when the chapter of Várad confirmed his death. After his death, his four sons squandered the kindred's wealth with their rebellion. Two of them (Geregye II and Eth II) were executed by Ladislaus IV, while Paul's branch lost all of its political influence. Their lands and estates (including the two castles) were governed by the Borsa clan following their downfall.

== Sources ==
- Béli, Gábor (2013). "Vagyongyűjtő nagyurak IV. Béla idején [Lords' Acquisition During Béla IV]". Rubicon Online (in Hungarian). 24 (5).
- Markó, László (2006). A magyar állam főméltóságai Szent Istvántól napjainkig: Életrajzi Lexikon [Great Officers of State in Hungary from King Saint Stephen to Our Days: A Biographical Encyclopedia] (in Hungarian). Helikon Kiadó. ISBN 963-208-970-7.
- Rudolf, Veronika (2023). Közép-Európa a hosszú 13. században [Central Europe in the Long 13th Century] (in Hungarian). Arpadiana XV., Research Centre for the Humanities. ISBN 978-963-416-406-7.
- Sălăgean, Tudor (2016). Transylvania in the Second Half of the Thirteenth Century: The Rise of the Congregational System. East Central and Eastern Europe in the Middle Ages 450–1450. Vol. 37. Leiden and Boston: Brill. ISBN 978-90-04-24362-0.
- Szűcs, Jenő (2002). Az utolsó Árpádok [The Last Árpáds] (in Hungarian). Osiris Kiadó. ISBN 963-389-271-6.
- Zsoldos, Attila (2011). Magyarország világi archontológiája, 1000–1301 [Secular Archontology of Hungary, 1000–1301] (in Hungarian). História, MTA Történettudományi Intézete. ISBN 978-963-9627-38-3.
- Zsoldos, Attila (2016). "A Berettyó urai [The Lords of Berettyó]". In Zsoldos, Attila (ed.). Nagyvárad és Bihar az Árpád-kor végén (Tanulmányok Biharország történetéből 3.) (in Hungarian). Varadinum Kulturális Alapítvány. pp. 101–154. ISBN 978-973-0-21419-2.
- Zsoldos, Attila (2019). Adorján három ostroma. Oligarchák a Tiszántúlon a 13–14. század fordulóján [The Three Sieges of Adorján. Oligarchs in Transtisia at the turn of the 13–14th Centuries] (in Hungarian). Varadinum Kulturális Alapítvány. ISBN 978-973-0-29349-4.

Paul Genus Geregye Born: c. 1206 Died: before 1271
Political offices
Preceded by Andrew, son of Serafin	Judge royal 1241	Succeeded by Ladislaus Kán
Preceded by Roland Rátót	Judge royal 1248–1254	Succeeded by Henry Kőszegi
