= Dominic Csák =

Hungarian nobleman

Palatine for rex iunior Stephen
- Reign: 1266
- Predecessor: Denis Péc
- Successor: Benedict Balog
- Died: after 1300
- Noble family: gens Csák
- Spouse: N Kőszegi (?)
- Issue: Nicholas; Stephen I Peter II
- Father: Peter I

Dominic from the kindred Csák (Hungarian: Csák nembeli Domokos; died after 1300) was a Hungarian lord in the 13th century. Initially, he was a confidant of rex iunior Stephen, but later joined the partisans of the elderly Béla IV of Hungary. During the era of feudal anarchy, he served as a courtier of Queen Dowager Elizabeth the Cuman.

== Family ==
Dominic was born into the Dobóc (or Orbova) branch of the gens (clan) Csák as the son of Peter (I). Formerly, 19th-century genealogist Iván Nagy considered that Dominic belonged to the clan's Újlak branch. He had three brothers, Michael, who served as ispán of Veszprém County in 1272, Simon and possibly Beers.

Dominic had three sons from his marriage with an unidentified noblewoman: Nicholas, Stephen (I) and Peter (II). All of them were first mentioned by contemporary records in 1280. Dominic's branch became extinct by the middle of the 14th century. Some historians – including Renáta Skorka and Veronika Rudolf – considered that Dominic Csák perhaps is identical with that Dominic, who (secondly?) married an unidentified daughter of the powerful lord Ivan Kőszegi. The existence of the latter is mentioned by Ottokar aus der Gaal's Steirische Reimchronik ("Styrian Rhyming Chronicle").

== Duke Stephen's partisan ==
The Dobóc branch possessed landholdings in Slavonia in the territory between the Drava and the Sava, mostly in Požega County. The family owned the settlements Dubovac (Dobóc) and Vrbova (Orbova) in the southeastern part of Slavonia. It is possible that Peter and his sons entered court service, when the child Stephen, as King Béla's elder son and heir, bore the title Duke of Slavonia from 1245 to 1257. Dominic and his brothers followed their lord Stephen to Transylvania then the Duchy of Styria, after he was installed as duke of those provinces in 1257 and 1258, respectively.

Dominic first appeared in contemporary records in 1262, when Duke Stephen already returned to Transylvania. In that year, his lord sent him as a special envoy to the royal court of Béla IV in order to inform the monarch of the birth of his grandson, prince Ladislaus (b. 5 August 1262). Therefore, and for other undisclosed merits, Dominic was granted the former landholdings of a certain Hippolytus, grandson of Mohor, who died without male descendants. The acquired lands lay in Valkó and Syrmia counties. By that time, the relationship between Béla IV and his son Stephen became tense. In the same year (autumn 1262), a brief skirmish took place and Stephen forced his father to cede all the lands of the Kingdom of Hungary to the east of the Danube to him and adopted the title of junior king in December 1262. Despite, Dominic's lands were located in the territory of the senior king (Duchy of Slavonia), he remained an important partisan of Stephen. He was styled as cup-bearer of Stephen's court and ispán of Zemplén County in 1263 (according to a non-authentic charter, he already held the court dignity from the previous year). He counter-signed the agreements between the two monarchs at Pressburg (today Bratislava, Slovakia) then Poroszló and acted as one of the oath-makers to the validity of the two documents in May 1263, when Stephen urged the papal confirmation of the treaty in his charter at the monastery of Szakoly.

Dominic participated in Stephen's military campaign to Bulgaria in 1263, when the younger king sent reinforcements in order to support Jacob Svetoslav against the Byzantine Empire. Duke Stephen donated the villages of Sztára (today Staré), Perecse (today a borough of Michalovce, Slovakia) and Szőlőske (today Viničky, Slovakia) in Zemplén County to Dominic, where he functioned as ispán, in addition to Muhi and Nyárád in Borsod County, as a compensation for his temporary losses in Béla's realm. According to Stephen's ledger from the first half of 1264, compiled by Syr Wulam, Dominic received gifts worth a total of 29 marks four times from his lord, who tried to attract his followers spasmodically during the continuously emerging tension with his father. Stephen's palatine, Denis Péc defected to the court of King Béla sometime around the autumn of 1264. It is possible that Dominic succeeded him as palatine of the younger king immediately after his betrayal, but he was first mentioned in this capacity only in November 1266. The deteriorating relationship between Béla and Stephen sparked into a large-scale civil war in December 1264. While his brother Michael actively participated in the clashes during the war, Dominic's involvement in the civil war is uncertain (the 1272 donation letter of Stephen V emphasized only Michael's military activities, despite the brothers were jointly rewarded). Nevertheless, it is possible Dominic – along with Michael, who was certainly present – was among the few dozen defenders in the siege of the fort of Feketehalom (today Codlea, Romania) at the turn of 1264 and 1265, while he presumably also participated in the decisive Battle of Isaszeg in early March 1265.

Sometime during or after the civil war, which resulted Stephen's victory, Dominic was installed as palatine of the younger king's realm, ispán of Bács and Szeben counties, inheriting the offices of Denis Péc. He was first mentioned in these capacities in November–December 1266. Upon Dominic's request, his servant, the castle warrior James, son of Denis was ennobled to royal servant status by Stephen in 1266, detaching the land Bába from the royal district of Borsod Castle for him. His judicial activity covered Northeast Hungary. During that time, Dominic held his residence in Perecse, where he issued his only charter as palatine on 25 December 1266. A few days later, however, Dominic and Michael turned against their lord Stephen and fled to the royal court of Béla IV. The younger king immediately appointed Benedict Balog as his successor. According to historian János Karácsonyi, the reason for his defection was that this was the only way he could protect his previously acquired estates in Syrmia and Valkó counties, because Lampert Vaja – claiming a kinship relationship with the late Hippolytus – disputed and contested his ownership over the estates in the two counties. Before the collegiate chapter of Buda, Dominic reached an out-of-court settlement with the Vaja kindred in 1267: he handed over the ancient family estates of Hippolytus to the kindred, but he and his brothers – Michael, Simon and Beers – retained those properties, which were acquired by the aforementioned lord or his descendants during their lifetime. This coherent lordship was Ilok (Újlak), which once was bought by the grandfather Mohor, according to the document. In February 1268, he additionally paid 60 silver marks to the Vajas before the collegiate chapter of Székesfehérvár. Michael – and possibly Dominic – participated in the war against Stefan Uroš I in 1268. Béla IV appointed Dominic as ispán of Baranya County around April 1269. The county belonged to the dukedom of Béla of Slavonia during that period. He sold his estate Baracs in Nyitra County (today Bardoňovo, Slovakia) to Philip Türje, the Archbishop of Esztergom in June 1269.

== Queen Elizabeth's confidant ==
Béla IV died on 3 May 1270. Stephen V ascended the Hungarian throne within weeks. In order to eliminate threat from the Kingdom of Bohemia and to stabilize of the domestic political situation, the newly crowned king reconciled with the former partisans of his late father, including Dominic and Michael Csák. On 15 June 1270, in this spirit, Stephen V transcribed Béla's donation letter from the previous year (9 April 1269) to Michael, in which he confirmed him in the previous donation concerning Erdőcsokonya in Somogy County, but his diploma omit to mention Béla's other donations to Michael (e.g. Kisvid, Som, Kovácsi). Stephen extended the donation to Dominic and his descendants too. He also exempted Dominic, Michael and their descendants from the jurisdiction of the palatine and other barons, and placed them directly under the king's court or the judge royal. Both Dominic and Michael remained supporters of the king for the remaining part of his short reign. When Ottokar II of Bohemia invaded Hungary in the spring of 1271, they fought against the Bohemians in the northern part of the county. Both of them were present in the decisive battle on the Rábca River on 21 May 1271, when Stephen routed Ottokar's army. Dominic was made ispán of Valkó County prior to 1272. Because of Michael's advanced military service, the brothers were granted Karos in Zala County in August 1272, shortly before Stephen's death.

During the reign of Stephen V, Dominic gradually became a confidant of queen consort Elizabeth the Cuman. When Joachim Gutkeled kidnapped Stephen's heir, the 10-year-old Ladislaus in the summer of 1272, it marked the beginning of the era of "feudal anarchy". Stephen V, who unsuccessfully attempted to liberate his son, seriously fell ill and died on 6 August 1272. Joachim Gutkeled departed for Székesfehérvár as soon as he was informed of Stephen V's death, because he wanted to arrange Ladislaus' coronation. Stephen's widow, Queen Elizabeth joined him, infuriating the deceased monarch's partisans who accused her of having conspired against her husband. Two of them, brothers Egidius Monoszló and Gregory Monoszló, along with their followers, immediately laid siege in late August to the Dowager Queen's palace in Székesfehérvár to "rescue" Ladislaus from the rival baronial group's influence. Dominic was present during the skirmish and determined to defend the manor house from the attackers. He had just knocked out the sword from the hand of one of the attackers and wanted to stab him with the weapon when the other conspirators struck him and brutally cut him up. He almost died on the spot. The Monoszlós' coup d'état attempt ended in failure as the Gutkeled troops routed their army after some clashes and bloodshed. At the end of the year, the recovering Dominic was installed as count (head) of the court of Dowager Queen Elizabeth. For his sacrifice, the queen donated the estate Hagymás (today Aljmaš, Croatia) lay at the confluence of rivers Danube and Drava in Valkó County, along with its accessories and local river duties, to Dominic in the first half of 1273 in exchange for his lands in Abaúj (or Borsod) and Zemplén counties – he lost Muhi, Nyárád, Szőlőske, Sztára and Perecse with this document. Dominic held the court dignity by 1274 at the latest.

In the subsequent years, Dominic remained a prominent member of the entourage of Queen Elizabeth, which, however, meant a political marginalization for him since the queen was soon expelled from real power and her regency remained only nominal after 1273. Dominic served as treasurer of Elizabeth's court throughout from around 1274 to 1280 with a brief interruption in 1276. One of his sons, Nicholas was the godson of Elizabeth. Dominic bought the land Görbő (today a borough of Pincehely) in Tolna County from Blaise Naki in 1275. Dominic and Michael temporarily became disgraced due to their involvement in the attack and sack of the Diocese of Veszprém in the spring of 1276, led by their relative Peter Csák. According to Queen Elizabeth's charter from that year, both of them actively participated in the "horrible attack", therefore she confiscated the village Karos from them and handed over the possession to the bishopric of Veszprém as a compensation. According to historian János Karácsonyi, King Ladislaus IV confirmed Dominic as the owner of Újlak in 1278. The document refers to him with "de Wlko", which implies that he resided there permanently (other historians proved, however, the document with the supposed date 1283 is a 14th-century forgery). Nevertheless, the lordship somehow was transferred to the property of Dominic's distant relative Ugrin Csák by the second half of the 1280s, who built his castle and the centre of his large-scale domains there. Following that, Dominic and his sons built their own castle at Orbova, which became the permanent residence of the family. When Ladislaus IV entrusted his mother to administer Szepesség (Spiš) in 1279, after the region recovered from the rebellious Roland, son of Mark, Elizabeth entrusted her treasurer Dominic to investigate and supervise ownership rights of landholdings in the county, regarding secular and ecclesiastical estates too, upon the king's request.

== Last years ==
Following the assassination of Ladislaus IV in July 1290, his distant relative Andrew III was invited to the Hungarian throne. Dominic swore loyalty to the new monarch. After the Austrian–Hungarian War in the summer of 1291, where the Hungarians won a superior victory, Dominic was delegated to the four-member Hungarian diplomatic mission to conduct peace negotiations with the Austrian counterpart, alongside archbishops Lodomer and John Hont-Pázmány, and secular baron Gregory Péc. The Peace of Hainburg, which concluded the war, was signed on 26 August 1291, and three days later Andrew and Albert of Austria confirmed it at their meeting in Köpcsény (today Kopčany, Slovakia).

Upon King Andrew's request, his mother, Tomasina Morosini, moved to Hungary in late 1292 or early 1293. Andrew appointed her Duchess of Slavonia to administer Croatia, Dalmatia, and Slavonia. Dominic immediately entered her service. Already in 1293, he was styled as treasurer of the duchess' court and ispán of Valkó County. He still belonged to Tomasina' entourage in 1296, when acted as a co-judge in the lawsuit between members of the Kórógyi family on behalf of the duchess. If he is identical with Ivan Kőszegi's son-in-law, He fought in the Battle of Göllheim in July 1298, as a member of the Hungarian contingent, which was sent by Andrew III to support Albert against Adolf of Nassau. He participated in that diet in July 1298, when Albertino Morosini, the king's uncle, was accepted into the Hungarian nobility. Dominic was last mentioned as a living person in May 1300.

== Sources ==
- Gutheil, Jenő (1979). Az Árpád-kori Veszprém [Veszprém During the Age of Árpáds] (in Hungarian). Veszprém Megyei Levéltár. ISBN 9630111594.
- Kádár, Tamás (2020). "Az 1272. évi székesfehérvári "palotaforradalom" [The "Palace Revolution" of 1272 in Székesfehérvár]". Aetas (in Hungarian). 35 (2). AETAS Könyv- és Lapkiadó Egyesület: 49–65. ISSN 0237-7934.
- Karácsonyi, János (1901). A magyar nemzetségek a XIV. század közepéig. I. kötet [The Hungarian genera until the middle of the 14th century, Vol. 1] (in Hungarian). Hungarian Academy of Sciences.
- Rudolf, Veronika (2023). Közép-Európa a hosszú 13. században [Central Europe in the Long 13th Century] (in Hungarian). Arpadiana XV., Research Centre for the Humanities. ISBN 978-963-416-406-7.
- Szőcs, Tibor (2014). A nádori intézmény korai története, 1000–1342 [An Early History of the Palatinal Institution: 1000–1342] (in Hungarian). Magyar Tudományos Akadémia Támogatott Kutatások Irodája. ISBN 978-963-508-697-9.
- Zolnay, László (1964). "István ifjabb király számadása 1264-ből [The Account of Younger King Stephen from 1264]". Budapest Régiségei. 21. Budapesti Történeti Múzeum: 79–114. ISSN 0133-1892.
- Zsoldos, Attila (2005). Az Árpádok és asszonyaik. A királynéi intézmény az Árpádok korában [The Árpáds and their Women: The Institution of Queenship in the Era of the Árpáds] (in Hungarian). MTA Történettudományi Intézete. ISBN 963-8312-98-X.
- Zsoldos, Attila (2007). Családi ügy: IV. Béla és István ifjabb király viszálya az 1260-as években [A family affair: The Conflict between Béla IV and Junior King Stephen in the 1260s] (in Hungarian). História, MTA Történettudományi Intézete. ISBN 978-963-9627-15-4.
- Zsoldos, Attila (2011). Magyarország világi archontológiája, 1000–1301 [Secular Archontology of Hungary, 1000–1301] (in Hungarian). História, MTA Történettudományi Intézete. ISBN 978-963-9627-38-3.

Dominic Genus Csák Born: ? Died: after 1300
Political offices
| Preceded by Denis Péc | Palatine for rex iunior Stephen; 1266 | Succeeded by Benedict Balog |
