= Ispán (disambiguation) =

Ispán ("count") is the Hungarian title of a number of officials in the Kingdom of Hungary.

It may refer to:

- ispán, the head (usually appointed by the monarch) of a castle district (a fortress and the royal lands attached to it) or an administrative unit called county;
- the head of autonomous ethnic groups within the kingdom, including
  - the székelyispán or Count of the Székelys, the royal officials leading the Hungarian-speaking Székely community in Transylvania (now in Romania) in the Middle Ages,
  - the szebeni ispán or Count Hermannstadt (Nagyszeben, Sibiu), the head of the Transylvanian Saxons between 1224 and 1324.

Related

- Főispán (literally "chief ispán," originally county lord-lieutenant), more recently capital and county government commissioner, a historical term reintroduced in 2022 instead of self-explanatory kormánymegbízott.

== See also ==
- County (Kingdom of Hungary)
- Župa
