= Stephen Geregye =

Ispán of Vas
- Reign: 1260
- Predecessor: Nicholas
- Successor: Benedict, son of Fancs
- Died: after 1278
- Noble family: gens Geregye
- Father: Paul
- Mother: N Győr

Stephen from the kindred Geregye (Hungarian: Geregye nembeli István; died after 1278) was a Hungarian noble, who served as ispán of Vas County in 1260.

== Life ==
He was born into the gens Geregye as the second son of Judge royal Paul Geregye and an unidentified granddaughter of Palatine Pat Győr. Stephen had no any known descendants.

Stephen supported and assisted his elder brother Nicholas' political ambitions and aspirations without questioning. In a charters issued in 1273 he was mentioned as "former" ispán of Vas County concerning Béla IV of Hungary's royal campaign against the Kingdom of Bohemia beyond the river Morava in 1260. He participated in the Battle of Kressenbrunn in July 1260. When Stephen V of Hungary ascended the Hungarian throne in 1270, several prominent partisans of the late Béla IV had fled the kingdom and placed themselves under the protection of Ottokar II of Bohemia. Nicholas and Stephen Geregye handed over the Dobra Castle in Vas County (today ruins near Neuhaus am Klausenbach, Austria) to the Bohemian king. During the 1271 Bohemian–Hungarian war, both Nicholas and Stephen Geregye took part in the invasion of Upper Hungary. Their troops plundered and looted Nyitra (today Nitra, Slovakia) with its cathedral and the surrounding lands. They also captured Joachim Szegi, a local noble during the siege.

Stephen V and Ottokar II concluded the Peace of Pressburg in July 1271, which ended the war resulting a Hungarian military victory. Ottokar renounced the support of Stephen's internal opposition and promised the extradition of them, including the Geregye brothers. Under the agreement, Stephen V regained Dobra for Hungary, which then became a royal castle. The Geregye brothers returned to Hungary shortly after the conclusion of the peace treaty and swore loyalty to Stephen V. Following the unexpected death of Stephen V in August 1272, Nicholas Geregye and his brothers regained influence. During the early reign of the minor Ladislaus IV of Hungary, the country has fallen into anarchy. Nicholas Geregye and his brothers tried to establish dominion independently from the king in Tiszántúl, however Ladislaus IV successfully defeated and eliminated their aspirations in 1277–1278, and this branch lost all of its political influence. Their lands and estates were governed by the Borsa clan following their downfall. Stephen was last mentioned by records in 1278.

== Sources ==
- Rudolf, Veronika (2023). Közép-Európa a hosszú 13. században [Central Europe in the Long 13th Century] (in Hungarian). Arpadiana XV., Research Centre for the Humanities. ISBN 978-963-416-406-7.
- Zsoldos, Attila (2007). Családi ügy: IV. Béla és István ifjabb király viszálya az 1260-as években [A family affair: The Conflict between Béla IV and Junior King Stephen in the 1260s] (in Hungarian). História, MTA Történettudományi Intézete. ISBN 978-963-9627-15-4.
- Zsoldos, Attila (2011). Magyarország világi archontológiája, 1000–1301 [Secular Archontology of Hungary, 1000–1301] (in Hungarian). História, MTA Történettudományi Intézete. ISBN 978-963-9627-38-3.

Stephen Genus Geregye Born: ? Died: after 1278
Political offices
Preceded by Nicholas	Ispán of Vas; 1260	Succeeded by Benedict, son of Fancs
