= Stephen, son of Tekesh =

Hungarian nobleman (1200s CE)

Voivode of Transylvania
- Reign: 1280
- Predecessor: Finta Aba
- Successor: Roland Borsa
- Died: after 1280
- Issue: 5 sons a daughter
- Father: Tekesh

Stephen, son of Tekesh (Hungarian: Tekes fia István; died after 1280) was a Hungarian distinguished nobleman, who served as voivode of Transylvania in 1280, during the reign of Ladislaus IV of Hungary.

His father was Tekesh, son of Nicholas, who served as ispán (comes) of Sáros County for several times. Stephen had two brothers, John and Ladislaus. He had five sons and a daughter from unidentified wife. His name is mentioned by contemporary records since 1267. He supported junior king Stephen at first, however later became a partisan of Béla IV of Hungary, as a result he lost his political influence when Stephen V ascended the throne in 1270.

Following the coronation of Ladislaus IV, Stephen was appointed ispán of Bereg County in 1273. He also became head of the Patak ispánate, a royal estate (1273–1282) and master of the chariots (Hungarian: szekérnagy; Latin: maior plaustrorum), holding the latter office until 1275. He served as ispán of Torna County in 1277. The Szádvár Castle, centre of the county was donated by Ladislaus IV to the sons of Tekesh and later confirmed by Andrew III of Hungary. During that time Stephen held the title of "perpetual count".

Stephen served as ban of Kucsó in 1279. He functioned as voivode of Transylvania for a short time in 1280. Perhaps he was a strong supporter of Finta Aba. Stephen built up a dominant power along with his brothers in North-East Hungary (Torna and Sáros Counties).

== Sources ==
- Engel, Pál (2001). The Realm of St Stephen: A History of Medieval Hungary, 895-1526. I.B. Tauris Publishers. ISBN 1-86064-061-3.
- (in Hungarian) Markó, László (2006). A magyar állam főméltóságai Szent Istvántól napjainkig – Életrajzi Lexikon ("The High Officers of the Hungarian State from Saint Stephen to the Present Days – A Biographical Encyclopedia") (2nd edition); Helikon Kiadó Kft., Budapest; ISBN 963-547-085-1.
- (in Hungarian) Zsoldos, Attila (2011). Magyarország világi archontológiája, 1000–1301 ("Secular Archontology of Hungary, 1000–1301"). História, MTA Történettudományi Intézete. Budapest. ISBN 978-963-9627-38-3

Political offices
Preceded by Finta Aba	Voivode of Transylvania; 1280	Succeeded by Roland Borsa
