= John of Transylvania =

Hungarian nobleman

John

Voivode of Transylvania
- Reign: 1273
- Predecessor: Nicholas Geregye
- Successor: Nicholas Geregye
- Died: 1273

John (Hungarian: János; died 1273) was a Hungarian distinguished nobleman, who served as voivode of Transylvania in 1273, during the reign of Ladislaus IV of Hungary.

== Sources ==
- Engel, Pál (2001). The Realm of St Stephen: A History of Medieval Hungary, 895-1526. I.B. Tauris Publishers. ISBN 1-86064-061-3.
- (in Hungarian) Markó, László (2006). A magyar állam főméltóságai Szent Istvántól napjainkig – Életrajzi Lexikon ("The High Officers of the Hungarian State from Saint Stephen to the Present Days – A Biographical Encyclopedia") (2nd edition); Helikon Kiadó Kft., Budapest; ISBN 963-547-085-1.
- Treptow, Kurt W. & Popa, Marcel (1996). Historical Dictionary of Romania. Scarecrow Press, Inc. ISBN 0-8108-3179-1.
- (in Hungarian) Zsoldos, Attila (2011). Magyarország világi archontológiája, 1000–1301 ("Secular Archontology of Hungary, 1000–1301"). História, MTA Történettudományi Intézete. Budapest. ISBN 978-963-9627-38-3

Political offices
Preceded by Nicholas Geregye	Voivode of Transylvania; 1273	Succeeded by Nicholas Geregye
