= Eth Geregye =

Hungarian nobleman

Voivode of Transylvania
- Reign: 1200
- Predecessor: Legforus
- Successor: Julius Kán
- Died: after 1215
- Noble family: gens Geregye
- Spouse: Unknown
- Issue: Paul; Geregye I

Eth from the kindred Geregye (Écs; died after 1215) was a Hungarian distinguished nobleman, who served as voivode of Transylvania and ispán (comes) of Fehér County in 1200, during the reign of King Emeric. Eth also functioned as ispán of Újvár County in 1201 and Kolozs County in 1215.

Eth was the first known member of the gens Geregye, which originated from the borderlands of Vas and Zala counties in Transdanubia. Simultaneously with his voivodeship, Eth became a landowner in Transylvania, when he was granted the first royal donations in Bihar County and the surrounding areas for his descendants, who were called the "lords of Berettyó" (or Barcău in Romanian) thereafter. His son was judge royal Paul Geregye, therefore, he was the grandfather of voivode Nicholas Geregye.

== Sources ==
- Markó, László (2006). A magyar állam főméltóságai Szent Istvántól napjainkig: Életrajzi Lexikon [Great Officers of State in Hungary from King Saint Stephen to Our Days: A Biographical Encyclopedia] (in Hungarian). Helikon Kiadó. ISBN 963-208-970-7.
- Zsoldos, Attila (2011). Magyarország világi archontológiája, 1000–1301 [Secular Archontology of Hungary, 1000–1301] (in Hungarian). História, MTA Történettudományi Intézete. ISBN 978-963-9627-38-3.
- Zsoldos, Attila (2016). "A Berettyó urai [The Lords of Berettyó]". In Zsoldos, Attila (ed.). Nagyvárad és Bihar az Árpád-kor végén (Tanulmányok Biharország történetéből 3.) (in Hungarian). Varadinum Kulturális Alapítvány. pp. 101–154. ISBN 978-973-0-21419-2.

Eth I Genus Geregye Born: ? Died: after 1215
Political offices
Preceded by Legforus	Voivode of Transylvania; 1200	Succeeded by Julius Kán
