= Fehér County (former) =

Fehér County was a county in Transylvania, Kingdom of Hungary between the 11th and the 18th century.

== List of ispáns ==
Term	Incumbent	Monarch	Notes	Source
1097	Mercurius	Coloman	comes Bellegrate	
c. 1177	Gál	Béla III		
1200	Eth	Emeric	from the gens Gerenye; also voivode of Transylvania (1200)	
1201	Julius	Emeric	from the gens Kán; also voivode of Transylvania (1201)	
1227	Pous	Andrew II	from the gens Csák; also master of the treasury for the prince (1227–1233)	
Later Fehér County was administered by vice-voivodes of Transylvania.				

== Sources ==
- (in Hungarian) Engel, Pál (1996). Magyarország világi archontológiája, 1301–1457, I. ("Secular Archontology of Hungary, 1301–1457, Volume I"). História, MTA Történettudományi Intézete. Budapest. ISBN 963-8312-44-0.
- (in Hungarian and German) Fallenbüchl, Zoltán (1994). Magyarország főispánjai, 1526–1848 ("Lord-Lieutenants of Counties in Hungary, 1526–1848"). Argumentum Kiadó. ISBN 963-7719-81-4.
- (in Hungarian) Zsoldos, Attila (2011). Magyarország világi archontológiája, 1000–1301 ("Secular Archontology of Hungary, 1000–1301"). História, MTA Történettudományi Intézete. Budapest. ISBN 978-963-9627-38-3.
