= Geregye (genus) =

Genus (gens) Geregye
- Country: Kingdom of Hungary
- Founded: c. 1200
- Founder: Eth I
- Final ruler: Kalmer
- Dissolution: c. 1302
- Cadet branches: House of Egervári

Geregye (also Geregen) was the name of a gens (Latin for "clan"; nemzetség in Hungarian) in the Kingdom of Hungary in the 13th century. The Egervári family originated from this clan. The ancient lands of the kindred were in Vas County (today Gyanógeregye and Egervár).

Later Judge royal Paul Geregye's branch acquired possessions in Szolnok and Kraszna Counties, where tried to establish dominion independently from the king, alongside other prominent clans (Abas, Gutkeleds, Kőszegis e.g.). However, Ladislaus IV of Hungary defeated and eliminated their aspirations in 1277–1278, and this branch lost all of its political influence. Their lands and estates were governed by the Borsa clan following their downfall.

== Members ==
- Eth I (fl. 1200–1215), Voivode of Transylvania
  - Paul (fl. 1236–1264; d. before 1271), Judge royal
    - Nicholas (fl. 1256–1279), Judge royal, Voivode of Transylvania
    - Stephen (fl. 1256–1278), ispán of Vas County
    - Geregye II (fl. 1275–1278), ispán of Baranya County, executed
    - Eth II (fl. 1281–1285), executed
    - Agnes (fl. 1258–1276), married Turul Nagymihályi, later became nun at Margaret Island
  - Geregye I
    - Barnabas (fl. 1255)
      - Kalmer (fl. 1277–1302), familiaris of Ivan Kőszegi and ancestor of the Egervári family
      - Marhard (fl. 1302)
      - Martin (fl. 1302)

== Sources ==
- (in Hungarian) János Karácsonyi: A magyar nemzetségek a XIV. század közepéig. Budapest: Magyar Tudományos Akadémia. 1900–1901.
- (in Hungarian) Zsoldos, Attila (1997). "Téténytől a Hód-tóig. Az 1279 és 1282 közötti évek politikatörténetének vázlata." In: Történelmi Szemle, Vol. XXXIX Issue 1. pp. 69–98.
