= Mačva War =

13th-century battle in present-day Serbia

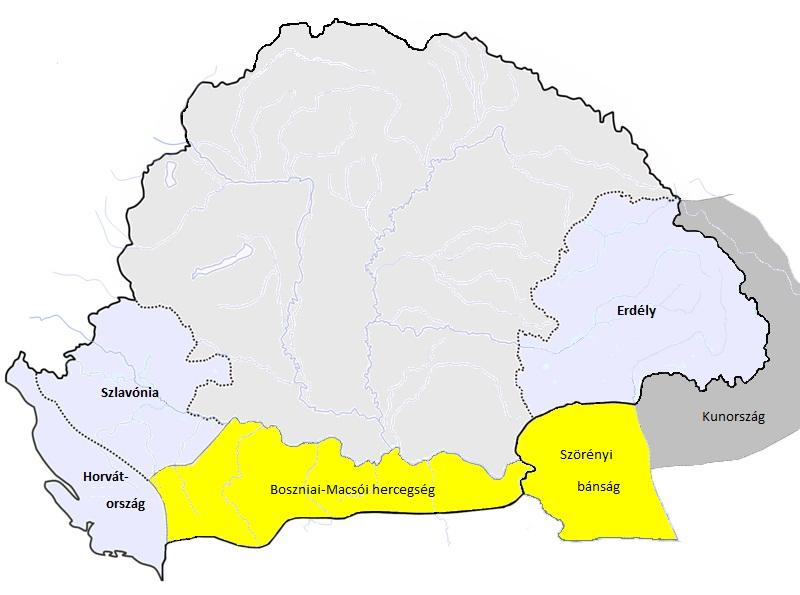
- Territory of the Duchy of Macsó (yellow) in the mid-13th century
Date	Spring 1268
Location	Mačva (Macsó), Kingdom of Hungary (present-day Serbia)
Result	Hungarian victory

Belligerents
Kingdom of Serbia	Kingdom of Hungary: Duchy of Macsó

Commanders and leaders
Stefan Uroš I (surrendered)	Béla IV; Béla of Macsó; Stephen Csák

The Mačva War of 1268 was a brief conflict between the Kingdom of Hungary and the Kingdom of Serbia in the Duchy of Mačva (or Macsó), the southern realm of the medieval Kingdom of Hungary.

== War ==
Taking advantage of the internal conflict and its consequences in Hungary, Stefan Uroš I brought an invasion force to Mačva, and did considerable damage to the city and the province in the spring of 1268. According to historian Judit Gál, when deciding on an invasion, those could also be taken into account that the Hungarian younger king Stephen entered into an alliance with the Byzantine Empire after the civil war (his daughter Anna was engaged to Andronikos Palaiologos), in addition to Stefan Uroš signed a peace treaty with the Republic of Ragusa in early 1268 to conclude the decade-long war with the Dalmatian maritime republic.

Duke Béla of Macsó sought assistance from his grandfather Béla IV, who sent a royal army commanded by Stephen Csák, who marched into the south in order to liberate the province. The arrival of Hungarian reinforcements from the north came to fight off the Serbs turned the tide of the conflict and Stefan Uroš was captured by the Hungarians, in addition to acquisition of Serbian warfare flags. Hungary retained the fortress and the surrounding province, albeit with heavy losses. Because of Stephen Csák's leadership – a member of the queenly court – in the military campaign, a charter of Queen Elizabeth the Cuman in 1271 claims that the army was commanded by Queen Maria Laskarina herself. Stephen Csák sent his familiaris Nicholas, son of Mark from Szepes County to inform the royal couple of the victory. Several foreign envoys – from the Golden Horde, Byzantine Empire, Kingdom of France and Kingdom of Bohemia – were present when the news arrives, in addition to the personal attendance of King Béla's sons-in-law Bolesław V the Chaste, Leo I of Galicia and Bolesław the Pious.

During the battle, a soldier Michael Csák bravely fought and captured two important Serbian barons: an unidentified son-in-law of King Stefan Uroš and a son of the monarch's treasurer in their full armor and with their horses in the sight of Duke Béla of Macsó. The duke's mother Duchess Anna of Macsó also testified his bravery in the royal court. Following the war, Michael agreed with the Serbs in a ransom of 800 marks to release the two captured lords. He received 300 marks in cash, while the remaining amount (500 marks = 3,000 Florentine florins) was covered by a gem reliquary cross (staurotheke), which allegedly contained pieces of wood from the True Cross upon which Jesus was crucified. King Béla IV and Queen Maria Laskarina intended to buy the relic from Michael, who thus requested landholdings from the royal couple, instead of an amount of money. Béla donated landed estates to him in Somogy County in April 1269.

== Aftermath ==
Younger King Stephen did not participate in the conflict, despite the argument of some historians, for instance Jenő Szűcs. However, he was involved in the post-war settlement: Stephen's firstborn daughter Catherine was given in marriage to Stephen Dragutin, the elder son and heir of King Stefan Uroš.

Mačva was not to stay in Hungarian hands for much longer, however, for in 1284, Stephen Dragutin received Mačva from King Ladislaus IV. The Hungarians restored their suzerainty over the Banate of Macsó in 1319.

== Sources ==
- Gál, Judit (2013). "IV. Béla és I. Uroš szerb uralkodó kapcsolata" [The Relationship of Kings Béla IV of Hungary and Uroš I of Serbia]. Századok (in Hungarian). 147 (2): 471–499.
- Popović, Danica (2019). "On Two Lost Medieval Serbian Reliquaries: The Staurothekai of King Stefan Uroš I and Queen Helen". Balcanica (50): 39–55. doi:10.2298/BALC1950039P. hdl:21.15107/rcub_dais_7795. S2CID 226868916.
- Szűcs, Jenő (2002). Az utolsó Árpádok [The Last Árpáds] (in Hungarian). Osiris Kiadó. ISBN 963-389-271-6.
