= Leustach I Rátót =

Hungarian nobleman

Leustach (I) Rátót

Voivode of Transylvania
- Reign: 1176 - c. 1196
- Predecessor: Mercurius (?)
- Successor: Legforus (?)
- Noble family: gens Rátót
- Spouse: Unknown
- Issue: Rathold; Julius I

Leustach Rátót (Hungarian: Rátót nembeli (I.) Leusták, "Leustach (I) from the kindred Rátót") was a Hungarian distinguished nobleman from the gens Rátót, ancestor of the Palatine and Gyulafi branches. According to a royal charter from 1230, he served as voivode of Transylvania from 1176 to c. 1196, thus he was the first reliably attested person to hold that office.

Leustach, alongside palatine Ampud (Ompud), was commissioned to lead the Hungarian reinforcements sent to the Byzantine Empire against the Seljuks in the Battle of Myriokephalon of 1176. The battle ended with the victory of the Seljuks.

== Sources ==
- Curta, Florin (2006). Southeastern Europe in the Middle Ages, 500-1250. Cambridge University Press. ISBN 978-0-521-89452-4.
- Kristó, Gyula (2003). Early Transylvania (895–1324). Lucidus Kiadó. ISBN 963-9465-12-7.
- (in Hungarian) Markó, László: A magyar állam főméltóságai Szent Istvántól napjainkig – Életrajzi Lexikon (The High Officers of the Hungarian State from Saint Stephen to the Present Days – A Biographical Encyclopedia) (2nd edition); Helikon Kiadó Kft., 2006, Budapest; ISBN 963-547-085-1.

Political offices
Preceded by (?) Mercurius	Voivode of Transylvania; 1176 – c. 1196	Succeeded by (?) Legforus
