= Roland Borsa =

Roland Borsa (Hungarian: [ˈborʃɒ]; Romanian: Roland Borșa [ˈborʃa]; c. 1250 - died 1301) was voivode of Transylvania for 3 periods in the late 13th century. He was known for battling the Mongol invasions and, later, for rebelling against King Charles I's attempts to control his territory.

== Origins ==
According to the earliest written sources, the Borsa family was originated from Barsa village (now Barsa is part of modern Füzesgyarmat). They received their first Transylvanian estate only in the early 13th century.

Roland Borsa was the member of a noble family, originally from the valley of the Borșa River (today in Cluj County, Romania), a tributary of the Someșul Mic river. A branch of the family was established in Bihor in the 12th century, and maintained close ties with the Transylvanian branch.

== First period of rule (1282) ==
Initially a supporter of the centralization policies of László IV, King of Hungary, Borsa was named voivod of Transylvania in the spring of 1282. In July and August he participated in the royal campaign against the Aba tribe, then distinguished himself with a decisive role in the victory over Cuman rebels. Despite this success, however, a series of royal concessions to the aristocracy forced Roland to resign his voivodship in favor of Apor Péc.

== Second period of rule (1284-1285) ==
Returning to the voivodship in 1284, Roland Borsa found himself faced with Mongol invasions. In the winter of 1285, he attempted to stem the invasion with a campaign in which the Transylvanians distinguished themselves through their valor on the battlefield. To assist in governing his new territories, he named a vice-voivod from the Transylvanian branch of the family, László Borsa of Szentmártón. Following a conflict with King László IV at the end of 1285, Roland Borsa was again stripped of his power.

== Reorganization of the voivodship and final period of rule ==
Roland Borsa was at the nadir of his fortunes when the Transylvanian voivodship began to reorganize along "congregational" lines, shifting de facto power to a group of landed nobles. When the first congregation of nobles met in 1285 near Turda, Roland Borsa had lost his Transylvanian lands and proved unable either to exercise any influence over the other nobles or to play an important role in governing the province. Nonetheless, as sentiment against László took a firmer hold on the nobility, he returned to power for a final time in 1288. Along with his brother, he organized the assassination of the King by Cuman mercenaries at Körösszeg in Bihor County in 1290. This action, along with his ill-concealed ambitions for Transylvania, led him into direct conflict with the last scion of the House of Árpád, András III. Defeated by royal forces in the Civil War of 1294, he was dismissed as voivod, but somehow managed to avoid the confiscation of his now-extensive lands. He died far from the corridors of power in 1301.

== Bibliography ==
- Sălăgean, Tudor (2005). Romanian Society in the Early Middle Ages (9th–14th Centuries AD). In: Pop, Ioan-Aurel; Bolovan, Ioan; History of Romania: Compendium; Romanian Cultural Institute (Center for Transylvanian Studies). Cluj-Napoca. ISBN 978-973-7784-12-4.
- Sălăgean, Tudor (2003, 2007). Transilvania în a doua jumătate a secolului al XIII-lea: Afirmarea regimului congregațional. (Centrul de Studii Transilvane. Cluj-Napoca.

Roland Genus Borsa Born: c. 1250 Died: 1301
Political offices
Preceded by Stephen, son of Tekesh	Voivode of Transylvania; 1282	Succeeded by Apor Péc
Preceded by Apor Péc	Voivode of Transylvania; 1284–1294	Succeeded by Ladislaus Kán
