= Legforus =

Hungarian nobleman

Voivode of Transylvania
- Reign: 1199–1200
- Predecessor: Leustach Rátót (?)
- Successor: Eth Geregye
- Died: after 1200

Legforus (died after 1200) was a Hungarian distinguished nobleman, who served as voivode of Transylvania from 1199 to 1200, during the reign of Emeric. His voivode title is documented by the earliest royal charter from 1199.

== Sources ==
- Kristó, Gyula (2003). Early Transylvania (895–1324). Lucidus Kiadó. ISBN 963-9465-12-7.
- (in Hungarian) Markó, László: A magyar állam főméltóságai Szent Istvántól napjainkig – Életrajzi Lexikon (The High Officers of the Hungarian State from Saint Stephen to the Present Days – A Biographical Encyclopedia) (2nd edition); Helikon Kiadó Kft., 2006, Budapest; ISBN 963-547-085-1.

Political offices
Preceded by (?) Leustach Rátót	Voivode of Transylvania; 1199–1200	Succeeded by Eth Geregye
