= Count of Hermannstadt =

The Count of Hermannstadt, also Count of Sibiu or Count of Szeben (Hungarian: szebeni ispán), was the head of the Transylvanian Saxons living in the wider region of Hermannstadt (now Sibiu in Romania) in the 13th and early 14th centuries. The counts were royal officials, appointed and dismissed by the Kings of Hungary.

== List of counts of Hermannstadt ==
=== Thirteenth century ===
Term	Incumbent	Monarch	Notes	Source
c. 1210	Joachim Türje	Andrew II		
c. 1266	Dominic Csák	Stephen V	also Palatine of the King junior, Stephen V, and ispán of Bács County	

=== Fourteenth century ===
Term	Incumbent	Monarch	Notes	Source
c. 1323	Nicholas Telegdi	Charles I		
1323-c. 1324	Thomas Szécsényi	Charles I	also Voivode of Transylvania	
c. 1329	Nicholas Brassói	Charles I		

== Sources ==
- Curta, Florin (2006). Southeastern Europe in the Middle Ages, 500–1250. Cambridge University Press. ISBN 978-0-521-89452-4.
- Engel, Pál (1996). Magyarország világi archontológiája, 1301–1457, I [Secular Archontology of Hungary, 1301–1457, Volume I] (in Hungarian). História, MTA Történettudományi Intézete. ISBN 963-8312-44-0.
- Engel, Pál (2001). The Realm of St Stephen: A History of Medieval Hungary, 895–1526. I.B. Tauris Publishers. ISBN 1-86064-061-3.
- Zsoldos, Attila (2011). Magyarország világi archontológiája, 1000–1301 [Secular Archontology of Hungary, 1000–1301] (in Hungarian). História, MTA Történettudományi Intézete. ISBN 978-963-9627-38-3.
