= Mercurius of Transylvania =

12th-century Voivode of Transylvania

Mercurius
- Princeps Ultrasilvanus
- Reign: c. 1111 - c. 1113
- Predecessor: first known
- Successor: Leustach Rátót (?)
- Native name: Merkúr

Mercurius (Hungarian: Merkúr) was a Hungarian distinguished nobleman and perhaps the first known voivode of Transylvania, who held the office during the reign of Coloman, King of Hungary. Two royal charters issued in 1111 and 1113 (the so-called Zobor Documents) mention Mercurius as "princeps Ultrasilvanus", but he may have been only an important landowner in Transylvania without holding any specific office. The title voivode was first documented specifically in 1199.

A source from 1097 also mentions a "Mercurio comes Bellegratae", which means "count (ispán) of Fehér", and this record may point to the same person.

== Sources ==
- Curta, Florin (2006). Southeastern Europe in the Middle Ages, 500-1250. Cambridge University Press. ISBN 978-0-521-89452-4.
- Makkai, László (2001). Transylvania in the medieval Hungarian kingdom (896-1526), In: Béla Köpeczi, HISTORY OF TRANSYLVANIA Volume I. From the Beginnings to 1606, Columbia University Press, New York, 2001, ISBN 0-88033-479-7
- (in Hungarian) Markó, László: A magyar állam főméltóságai Szent Istvántól napjainkig – Életrajzi Lexikon (The High Officers of the Hungarian State from Saint Stephen to the Present Days – A Biographical Encyclopedia) (2nd edition); Helikon Kiadó Kft., 2006, Budapest; ISBN 963-547-085-1.
- (in Hungarian) Zsoldos, Attila (2011). Magyarország világi archontológiája, 1000–1301 ("Secular Archontology of Hungary, 1000–1301"). História, MTA Történettudományi Intézete. Budapest. ISBN 978-963-9627-38-3

Political offices
Preceded by first known office-holder	Voivode of Transylvania c. 1111 – c. 1113	Succeeded by (?) Leustach Rátót
