= Gyanógeregye =

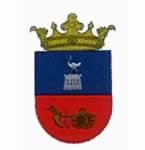
- Coat of arms

- Location of Gyanógeregye in Hungary
- Coordinates: 47°07′24″N 16°45′53″E
- Country: Hungary
- Region: Western Transdanubia
- County: Vas
- Subregion: Szombathelyi
- Rank: Village

Area
  - Total: 7.07 km^{2} (2.73 sq mi)

Population (1 January 2008)
  - Total: 171
  - Density: 24.2/km^{2} (62.6/sq mi)
- Time zone: UTC+1 (CET)
  - Summer (DST): UTC+2 (CEST)
- Postal code: 9774
- Area code: +36 94
- KSH code: 27030
- Website: www.gyanogeregye.hu

Gyanógeregye is a village in Vas county, Hungary.
