= Nicholas Geregye =

Hungarian baron and landowner

Judge royal
- Reign: 1275
- Predecessor: Thomas Hont-Pázmány
- Successor: Ugrin Csák
- Born: Unknown
- Died: after 1279
- Noble family: gens Geregye
- Father: Paul
- Mother: N Győr

Nicholas from the kindred Geregye (Hungarian: Geregye nembeli Miklós; died after 1279) was a Hungarian baron and landowner, member of the gens Geregye, who held several positions.

== Family ==
He was the son of judge royal Paul (d. before 1271) and an unidentified mother from the Győr clan, who was a granddaughter of palatine Pat Győr. The Geregye kindred originated from Zala and Vas counties, the westernmost part of Hungary, but Nicholas' father acquired several domains in Tiszántúl, mostly Bihar, Szolnok and Kraszna counties since the 1240s, which region had become the center of his political aspirations thereafter.

Nicholas had three brothers – Stephen, Geregye II, Eth II – and a sister, Agnes who married Turul Nagymihályi and after her husband's death, she joined to the monastery at Margaret Island. Nicholas' grandfather was voivode Eth I. As Geregye and Eth appeared in contemporary records decades later at the turn of the 1270s and 1280s than their elder brothers, historian Attila Zsoldos considers they were children from a supposed second marriage of Paul Geregye. There is no information about Nicholas' any wives nor descendants.

== Duke Stephen's partisan ==
Nicholas and his brother Stephen were first mentioned by a royal charter in 1256, when Béla IV of Hungary obliged their father Paul to return certain acquired lands along the river Sebes-Körös (Crișul Repede): Telegd, Szabolcs, Sonkolyos and Bertény with its royal customs (today Tileagd, Săbolciu, Șuncuiuș and Birtin in Romania, respectively) to the original owners, the members of the Csanád clan. According to the verdict, Paul and his sons – Nicholas and Stephen – had to swear at the tomb of St. Ladislaus in Várad (present-day Oradea, Romania) to return the occupied lands. In the previous year (1255), the Geregye troops seized the landholdings of the neighboring Csanád clan; it is plausible that both Nicholas and Stephen had participated in the skirmish. According to a 1278 charter, Paul and his sons unlawfully possessed the land of Székelyhíd (today Săcueni, Romania) too. Following these lawless deeds, Paul became disgraced in the royal court and never held any dignities nor positions anymore. In this context, Nicholas and Stephen belonged to the partisans of Stephen, the Duke of Transylvania, whose relationship with his father Béla IV deteriorated by the early 1260s. The Geregyes' territory in Tiszántúl also laid near the province of the duke.

It is plausible Nicholas was identical with that namesake courtier, who served as count (head) of the ducal household in Styria in 1259. Around the same time, his brother Stephen was ispán of Vas County in 1260. After the Battle of Kressenbrunn, where Nicholas and Stephen Geregye fought, Béla was forced to renounce Styria in favor of Ottokar II of Bohemia. Duke Stephen and his retinue – including the Geregye brothers – left Styria and returned to Transylvania in 1260. Nicholas participated in Stephen's military campaign of 1263 as part of the Hungarian reinforcement in order to provide assistance for Despot Jacob Svetoslav against the Byzantine Empire. The Geregye brothers supported the duke in the civil war conflict between father and son, which evolved in 1264–65. It is possible that they fought in the Battle of Isaszeg in March 1265, as one of Nicholas' castle warriors from Vas County was granted the status of royal servants for his military merits in the battlefield by Stephen. Historian Attila Zsoldos considers their lands' geographical proximity to the ducal court in Transylvania, and their father' Paul deteriorating relationship with Béla IV both contributed to their involvement in the rebellion against the royal power.

Following the civil war, where Duke Stephen was victorious, Nicholas functioned as Voivode of Transylvania between 1267 and 1268, during the end of the reign of Béla IV (it is presumable, he held the dignity uninterruptedly from 1264 to 1270). The voivodeship belonged to the realm of Duke Stephen, who even adopted the title junior king in the second half of the 1260s.

== Aspirations to oligarchy ==
The Geregye brothers' loyalty to Duke Stephen suddenly broke up in May 1270, when the latter ascended the throne and became King of Hungary as Stephen V. Nicholas, along with several magnates, fled the country and placed himself under the protection of Ottokar II. The Bohemian king also received Dobra Castle in Vas County (today ruins near Neuhaus am Klausenbach, Austria) by Nicholas. He participated in Ottokar's campaign against Hungary in 1271, when Nicholas besieged and occupied the Nyitra Castle and came through on the Garam River. Their troops plundered and looted the episcopal town with its cathedral and the surrounding lands. They also captured Joachim Szegi, a local noble during the siege. After the peace treaty between Stephen V and Ottokar II (1271), Nicholas and Stephen Geregye returned to Hungary and swore loyalty to Stephen V, because Ottokar renounced the support of Stephen's internal opposition and promised the extradition of them, including the Geregye brothers. Under the agreement, Stephen V regained Dobra for Hungary, which then became a royal castle. However, Nicholas regained his former political influence only after the death of king Stephen V in 1272.

Between 1272 and 1274, during the reign of the minor Ladislaus IV, Nicholas was voivode of Transylvania and thus ispán (comes) of Szolnok County three times. He was elected judge royal and head of Bánya (Árkibánya) ispánate in 1275.

He actively participated in the struggle for power between the barons and supported the Kőszegi family and Joachim from the Gutkeled clan. Nicholas and his brothers tried to establish a dominion independently of the king. Nicholas had started to expand his influence over the territories that surrounded his possessions and castles, Adorján, Almás, Sólyomkő and Valkó. However king Ladislaus IV eliminated their rebellion with a military force in 1277. After that the Geregye clan lost its estates and political positions.

== Sources ==
- Engel, Pál (2001). The Realm of St Stephen: A History of Medieval Hungary, 895–1526. I.B. Tauris Publishers. ISBN 1-86064-061-3.
- Markó, László (2006). A magyar állam főméltóságai Szent Istvántól napjainkig: Életrajzi Lexikon [Great Officers of State in Hungary from King Saint Stephen to Our Days: A Biographical Encyclopedia] (in Hungarian). Helikon Kiadó. ISBN 963-208-970-7.
- Rudolf, Veronika (2023). Közép-Európa a hosszú 13. században [Central Europe in the Long 13th Century] (in Hungarian). Arpadiana XV., Research Centre for the Humanities. ISBN 978-963-416-406-7.
- Sălăgean, Tudor (2016). Transylvania in the Second Half of the Thirteenth Century: The Rise of the Congregational System. East Central and Eastern Europe in the Middle Ages 450–1450. Vol. 37. Leiden and Boston: Brill. ISBN 978-90-04-24362-0.
- Szűcs, Jenő (2002). Az utolsó Árpádok [The Last Árpáds] (in Hungarian). Osiris Kiadó. ISBN 963-389-271-6.
- Zsoldos, Attila (2007). Családi ügy: IV. Béla és István ifjabb király viszálya az 1260-as években [A family affair: The Conflict between Béla IV and Junior King Stephen in the 1260s] (in Hungarian). História, MTA Történettudományi Intézete. ISBN 978-963-9627-15-4.
- Zsoldos, Attila (2011). Magyarország világi archontológiája, 1000–1301 [Secular Archontology of Hungary, 1000–1301] (in Hungarian). História, MTA Történettudományi Intézete. ISBN 978-963-9627-38-3.
- Zsoldos, Attila (2016). "A Berettyó urai [The Lords of Berettyó]". In Zsoldos, Attila (ed.). Nagyvárad és Bihar az Árpád-kor végén (Tanulmányok Biharország történetéből 3.) (in Hungarian). Varadinum Kulturális Alapítvány. pp. 101–154. ISBN 978-973-0-21419-2.
- Zsoldos, Attila (2019). Adorján három ostroma. Oligarchák a Tiszántúlon a 13–14. század fordulóján [The Three Sieges of Adorján. Oligarchs in Transtisia at the turn of the 13–14th Centuries] (in Hungarian). Varadinum Kulturális Alapítvány. ISBN 978-973-0-29349-4.

Nicholas Genus Geregye Born: ? Died: after 1279
Political offices
Preceded by Ladislaus Kán	Voivode of Transylvania; 1267–1268	Succeeded by Matthew Csák
Preceded by Matthew Csák	Voivode of Transylvania; 1272–1273	Succeeded by John
Preceded by John	Voivode of Transylvania; 1273–1274	Succeeded by Matthew Csák
Preceded by Matthew Csák	Voivode of Transylvania; 1274	Succeeded by Matthew Csák
Preceded by Thomas Hont-Pázmány	Judge royal 1275	Succeeded by Ugrin Csák
