= Geregye II Geregye =

Hungarian noble

Geregye (II) Geregye

Ispán of Baranya
- Reign: 1275
- Predecessor: Herbord Osl
- Successor: Joachim Gutkeled
- Died: 1278
- Noble family: gens Geregye
- Father: Paul
- Mother: N Győr

Geregye (II) from the kindred Geregye (Hungarian: Geregye nembeli (II.) Geregye; died 1278) was a Hungarian noble, who served as ispán of Baranya County for a short time in 1275.

== Life ==
He was born into the gens Geregye as the third son of Judge royal Paul Geregye and an unidentified granddaughter of Palatine Pat Győr. Geregye had no any known descendants.

When Nicholas Geregye and his younger brothers, including Geregye II, tried to establish a dominion independently from the king in Tiszántúl, King Ladislaus IV, when declared to be of age, successfully defeated and eliminated their aspirations in 1277–1278, also capturing their fortress at Adorján (now Adrian in Romania). Following this, Ladislaus IV held a "general assembly" for seven counties along the River Tisza in early summer of 1278, where Geregye II was sentenced to death for high treason and decapitated.

== Sources ==
- Zsoldos, Attila (2011). Magyarország világi archontológiája, 1000–1301 [Secular Archontology of Hungary, 1000–1301] (in Hungarian). História, MTA Történettudományi Intézete. ISBN 978-963-9627-38-3.

Geregye II Genus Geregye Born: ? Died: 1278
Political offices
Preceded by Herbord Osl	Ispán of Baranya; 1275	Succeeded by Joachim Gutkeled
