= Șuncuiuș =

- Commune
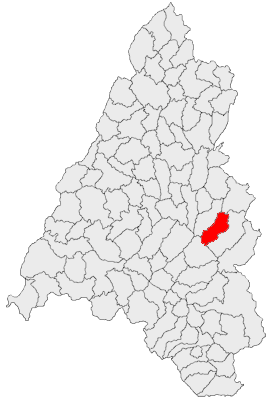
- Location in Bihor County

- Location in Romania
- Coordinates: 46°56′46″N 22°32′04″E
- Country: Romania
- County: Bihor
- Population (2021-12-01): 2,963
- Time zone: EET/EEST (UTC+2/+3)
- Vehicle reg.: BH
- Website: www.primariasuncuius.ro

Șuncuiuș (Hungarian: Vársonkolyos) is a commune in Bihor County, Crișana, Romania. It has a population of 3,259 people and is composed of four villages: Bălnaca (Körösbánlaka), Bălnaca-Groși (Körösbánlakai erdő), Șuncuiuș and Zece Hotare (Révtízfalu).

At the 2011 census, of the inhabitants for whom data were available, 89.8% of inhabitants were Romanians, 7.9% Roma and 2.1% Hungarians. Using the same parameters, the census counted 78.9% of inhabitants as Romanian Orthodox, 15.3% as Pentecostals, 3.2% as Baptists and 1.5% as Reformed.

The commune features a clay mine operated by the Timișoara-based Bega Grup.
