= Rinyakovácsi =

Rinyakovácsi Kováčka (in Croatian)
- Village
- Coat of arms

- Location of Somogy county in Hungary

- Location of Rinyakovácsi
- Coordinates: 46.28415°N 17.59750°E
- Country: Hungary
- Region: Southern Transdanubia
- County: Somogy
- District: Kaposvár
- RC Diocese: Kaposvár

Area
  - Total: 11.09 km^{2} (4.28 sq mi)

Population (2017)
  - Total: 187
  - Density: 16.9/km^{2} (43.7/sq mi)
- Demonym: rinyakovácsi
- Time zone: UTC+1 (CET)
  - Summer (DST): UTC+2 (CEST)
- Postal code: 7527
- Area code: (+36) 82
- NUTS 3 code: HU232
- MP: László Szászfalvi (KDNP)
- Website: Rinyakovácsi Online

Rinyakovácsi (Croatian: Kováčka) is a village in Somogy county, Hungary.
