= Toboliu =

- Commune
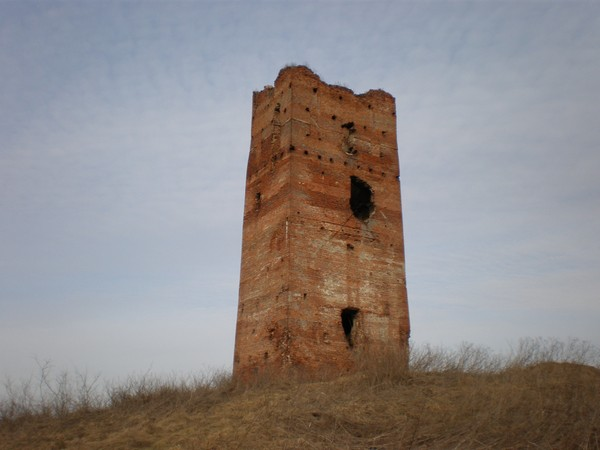
- The Cheresig keep

- Location in Bihor County

- Location in Romania
- Coordinates: 47°2′N 21°44′E
- Country: Romania
- County: Bihor

Government
  - Mayor (2024–2028): Adrian Petru Crăciun (PSD)
- Area: 38.5 km^{2} (14.9 sq mi)
- Elevation: 96 m (315 ft)
- Population (2021-12-01): 2,050
  - Density: 53.2/km^{2} (138/sq mi)
- Time zone: UTC+02:00 (EET)
  - Summer (DST): UTC+03:00 (EEST)
- Postal code: 417273
- Area code: +(40) x59
- Vehicle reg.: BH
- Website: toboliu.ro

Toboliu (Hungarian: Vizesgyán) is a commune located in Bihor County, Crișana, Romania. Established in 2007 when it was split from Girișu de Criș Commune, it is composed of two villages, Cheresig (Körösszeg) and Toboliu.

At the 2011 census, the commune had 2,088 inhabitants, of which 90.1% were Romanians, 6.6% Roma, and 2.9% Hungarians. At the 2021 census, Toboliu had a population of 2,050; of those, 85.71% were Romanians, 5.71% Roma, and 1.37% Hungarians.
