= Ladislaus IV of Hungary =

King of Hungary and Croatia from 1272 to 1290

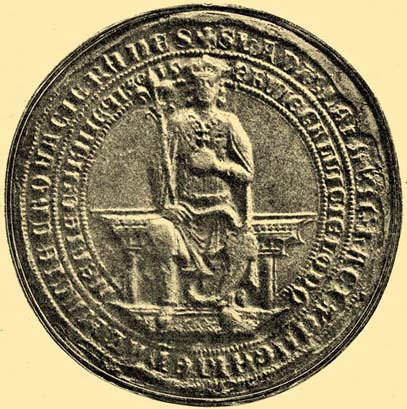
- Ladislaus IV of Hungary's seal

King of Hungary and Croatia
- Reign: 6 August 1272 – 10 July 1290
- Coronation: August 1272, Székesfehérvár
- Predecessor: Stephen V of Hungary
- Successor: Andrew III of Hungary
- Born: 5 August 1262
- Died: 10 July 1290 (aged 27); Körösszeg (Cheresig), Kingdom of Hungary
- Burial: Cathedral of Csanád (Cenad, Romania)
- Spouse: Elizabeth of Sicily (m. 1270)
- Dynasty: Árpád
- Father: Stephen V of Hungary
- Mother: Elizabeth the Cuman
- Religion: Roman Catholic

Ladislaus IV of Hungary (Hungarian: IV. (Kun) László, Croatian: Ladislav IV. (Kumanac), Slovak: Ladislav IV. (Kumánsky); 5 August 1262 – 10 July 1290), also known as Ladislaus the Cuman, was King of Hungary and Croatia from 1272 to 1290. His mother, Elizabeth, was the daughter of a chieftain from the pagan Cumans who had settled in Hungary. At the age of seven, he married Elisabeth, a daughter of King Charles I of Sicily. Ladislaus was only 9 when a rebellious lord, Joachim Gutkeled, kidnapped and imprisoned him.

Ladislaus was still a prisoner when his father Stephen V of Hungary died on 6 August 1272. During his minority, many groupings of barons – primarily the Abas, Csáks, Kőszegis, and Gutkeleds – fought against each other for supreme power. Ladislaus was declared to be of age at an assembly of the prelates, barons, noblemen, and Cumans in 1277. He allied himself with Rudolf I of Germany against Ottokar II of Bohemia. His forces had a preeminent role in Rudolf's victory over Ottokar in the Battle on the Marchfeld on 26 August 1278.

However, Ladislaus could not restore royal power in Hungary. A papal legate, Philip, bishop of Fermo, came to Hungary to help Ladislaus consolidate his authority, but the prelate was shocked at the presence of thousands of pagan Cumans in Hungary. Ladislaus promised that he would force them to adopt a Christian lifestyle, but they refused to obey the legate's demands. Ladislaus decided to support the Cumans, for which Philip of Fermo excommunicated him. The Cumans imprisoned the legate, and the legate's partisans captured Ladislaus. In early 1280, Ladislaus agreed to persuade the Cumans to submit to the legate, but many Cumans preferred to leave Hungary.

Ladislaus vanquished a Cuman army that invaded Hungary in 1282. Hungary also survived a Mongol invasion in 1285. Ladislaus had, by that time, become so unpopular that many of his subjects accused him of inciting the Mongols to invade Hungary. After he imprisoned his wife in 1286, he lived with his Cuman mistresses. During the last years of his life, he wandered throughout the country with his Cuman allies, but he was unable to control the most powerful lords and bishops any more. Pope Nicholas IV planned to declare a crusade against him, but three Cuman assassins murdered Ladislaus.

== Childhood (1262–1272) ==
Ladislaus was the elder son of Stephen, son of Béla IV of Hungary, and Stephen's wife Elizabeth the Cuman. Elizabeth was the daughter of a chieftain of the Cumans who had settled in Hungary. She was born as a pagan and was baptised before her marriage to Stephen. Ladislaus was born under the sign of Mars in 1262, according to Simon of Kéza, who was his chaplain in the 1270s.

Conflicts between Ladislaus's father and grandfather developed into a civil war in 1264. Béla IV's troops, which were under the command of Ladislaus's aunt Anna of Hungary, Duchess of Macsó, captured the castle of Sárospatak, where Ladislaus and his mother were staying, and imprisoned them. Ladislaus initially was kept in the Turóc Castle by Andrew I Hont-Pázmány, but two months later, he was sent to the court of his uncle Bolesław V the Chaste, Duke of Cracow. After his grandfather and father made peace in March 1265, Ladislaus was set free and returned to his father.

Ladislaus's father made an alliance with King Charles I of Sicily in September 1269. According to the treaty, Charles I's daughter, Elizabeth, who was about four years old at that time, was engaged to the seven-year-old Ladislaus. The children's marriage took place in 1270.

Béla IV of Hungary died on 3 May 1270, and Ladislaus's father was crowned King Stephen V of Hungary two weeks later; Stephen, however, could not stabilize his rule. Béla IV's closest advisors – Duchess Anna, and Béla IV's former palatine, Henry I Kőszegi – left Hungary and sought assistance from Anna's son-in-law, King Ottokar II of Bohemia. The newly appointed ban of Slavonia, Joachim Gutkeled, also turned against Stephen V and kidnapped Ladislaus in the summer of 1272. Gutkeled held Ladislaus in captivity in the fortress of Koprivnica in Slavonia. Historian Pál Engel suggests that Joachim Gutkeled planned to force Stephen V to divide Hungary with Ladislaus. Stephen V besieged Koprivnica, but could not take it. Stephen fell seriously ill and died on 6 August 1272.

== Reign ==
=== Minority (1272–1277) ===
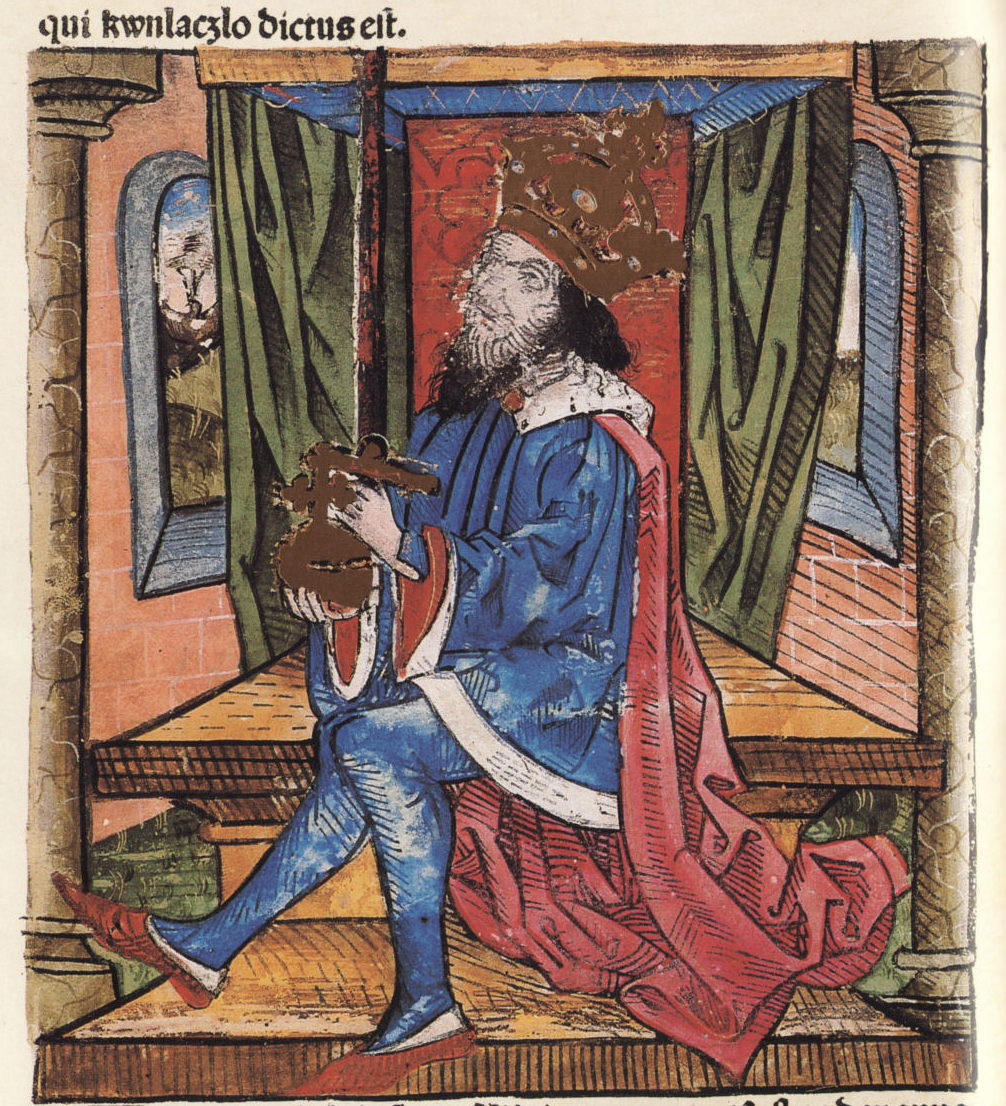
King Ladislaus IV as depicted in the Chronica Hungarorum

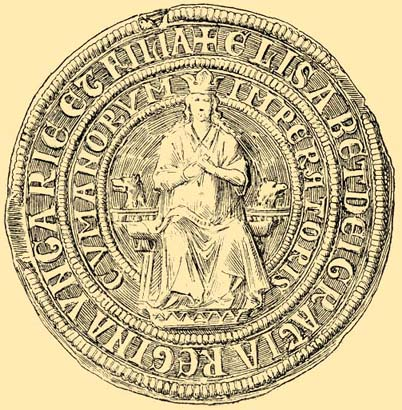
Seal of Ladislaus's mother, Elizabeth the Cuman

Joachim Gutkeled departed for Székesfehérvár as soon as he was informed of Stephen V's death, because he wanted to arrange the boy–king's coronation. Ladislaus's mother joined him, infuriating Stephen V's partisans, who accused her of having conspired against her husband. Stephen V's master of the treasury, Egidius Monoszló, laid siege to her palace in Székesfehérvár, but Gutkeled's supporters routed him. Monoszló fled to Pressburg (now Bratislava, Slovakia); he captured the town and ceded it to Ottokar II of Bohemia.

Archbishop Philip Türje crowned Ladislaus king in Székesfehérvár on about 3 September 1272. In theory, the 10-year-old Ladislaus ruled under his mother's regency, but in fact, baronial parties administered the kingdom. In November of that year, Henry Kőszegi returned from Bohemia and assassinated Ladislaus's cousin, Béla of Macsó. Duke Béla's extensive domains, which were located along the southern borders, were divided among Henry Kőszegi and his supporters. In retaliation for Hungarian incursions into Austria and Moravia, Austrian and Moravian troops invaded the borderlands of Hungary in April 1273. They captured Győr and Szombathely, plundering the western counties. Joachim Gutkeled recaptured the two forts two months later, but Ottokar II of Bohemia invaded Hungary and seized many fortresses, including Győr and Sopron in the autumn of 1273.

Peter I Csák and his allies removed Joachim Gutkeled and Henry Kőszegi from power, but Gutkeled and Kőszegi seized Ladislaus and his mother in June 1274. Although Peter Csák liberated the king and his mother, Gutkeled and Kőszegi captured Ladislaus's younger brother, Andrew, Duke of Slavonia, and took him to Slavonia. They demanded Slavonia in Duke Andrew's name, but Peter Csák defeated their united forces near Polgárdi at the end of September. Kőszegi was killed in the battle. Peter Csák then launched a campaign against Kőszegi's son and Ladislaus accompanied him. At the end of 1274, Rudolf I, the new king of Germany, and Ladislaus concluded an alliance against Ottokar II of Bohemia.

Ladislaus contracted an unidentified serious illness, but recovered from it. He attributed this recovery to a miracle by his deceased saintly aunt, Margaret of Hungary, and approached the Holy See to promote her canonisation in 1275. In the same year, a new civil war broke out between Joachim Gutkeled and Peter Csák. Ladislaus took part in Csák's military expedition against the Kőszegis, who were Gutkeled's supporters. However, Gutkeled and his supporters removed their opponents from power at an assembly of the barons and noblemen at Buda around 21 June 1276.

Taking advantage of the war between Rudolf I and Ottokar II, Ladislaus made an incursion into Austria in the autumn of 1276. Sopron soon accepted Ladislaus's suzerainty and Ottokar II promised to renounce all towns he occupied in western Hungary. However, new armed conflicts began in Hungary during 1277: the Transylvanian Saxons captured and destroyed Gyulafehérvár (now Alba Iulia in Romania), the see of the bishop of Transylvania, and the Babonići rose up in rebellion in Slavonia.

=== First years of majority (1277–1278) ===
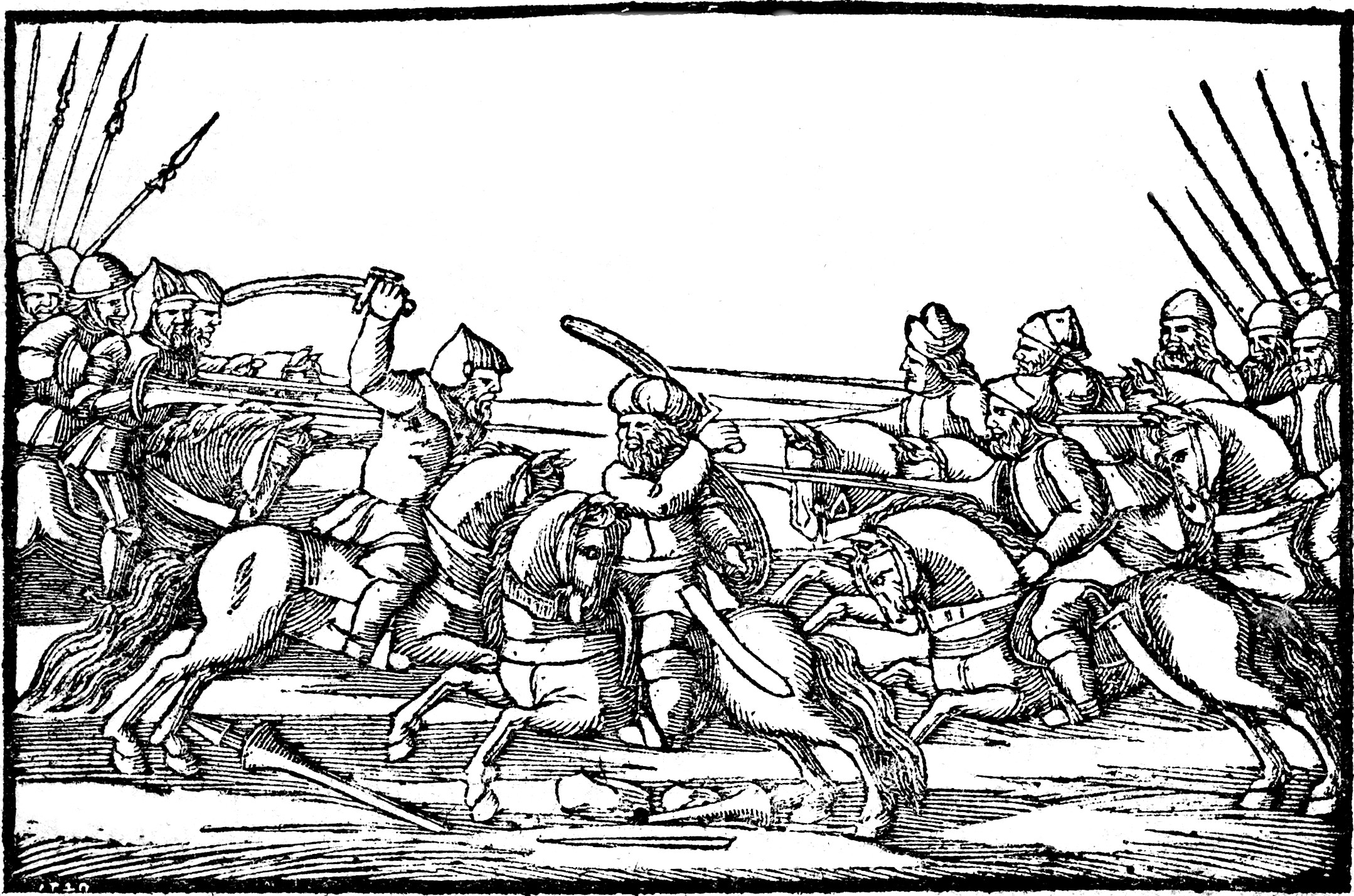
The Battle on the Marchfeld (26 August 1278)

Joachim Gutkeled died while battling against the Babonići in April 1277. A month later, an assembly of the prelates, barons, noblemen and Cumans declared Ladislaus to be of age. The estates of the realm also authorised the 15-year-old monarch to restore internal peace with all possible means. Ladislaus then invaded the Kőszegis's domains in Transdanubia, but could not defeat them. He met Rudolf I of Germany in Hainburg an der Donau on 11 November to confirm their alliance against Ottokar II of Bohemia.

After the royal army captured the rebellious Nicholas Geregye's fortress at Adorján (now Adrian in Romania), Ladislaus held a "general assembly" for seven counties along the River Tisza in the early summer of 1278. The assembly condemned two rebellious local noblemen to death. In Transdanubia, Ivan Kőszegi attempted to play off Ladislaus's father's first cousin, Andrew the Venetian, against Ladislaus. Andrew demanded Slavonia for himself, but returned to Venice without success.

Ladislaus joined forces with Rudolf I of Germany to launch a campaign against Ottokar II. Ladislaus's troops played a decisive role in Rudolf's victory in the Battle on the Marchfeld on 26 August. Ottokar was killed in the battlefield. After the battle, King Rudolf I gave Ladislaus "his thanks, declaring that through his help all Austria and Styria had been restored to him", according to Ladislaus's chronicler, Simon of Kéza.

=== The Cuman question (1278–1285) ===
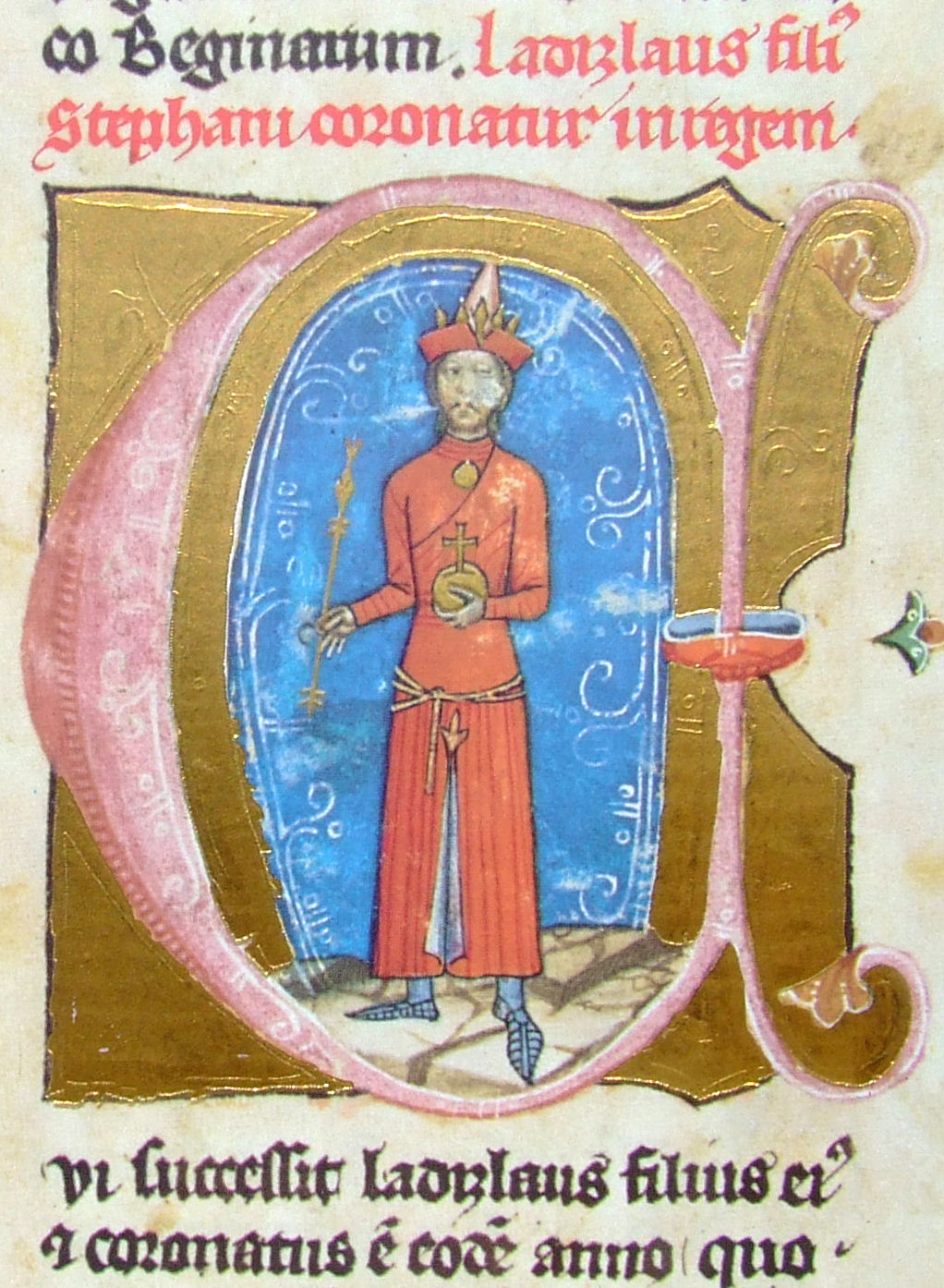
Ladislaus depicted in apparel favored by the Cumans (from the Illuminated Chronicle)

Pope Nicholas III sent Philip, bishop of Fermo, to Hungary to help Ladislaus restore royal power on 22 September 1278. The papal legate arrived in Hungary in early 1279. With the legate's mediation, Ladislaus concluded a peace treaty with the Kőszegis. Bishop Philip soon realised, however, that most Cumans were still pagans in Hungary. He extracted a ceremonious promise from the Cuman chieftains of giving up their pagan customs and persuaded the young King Ladislaus to swear an oath to enforce the keeping of the Cuman chieftains' promise. An assembly held at Tétény passed laws which, in accordance with the legate's demand, prescribed that the Cumans should leave their tents and live "in houses attached to the ground". The Cumans did not obey the laws, however, and Ladislaus, himself a half-Cuman, failed to force them. In retaliation, Bishop Philip excommunicated him and placed Hungary under interdict in October. Ladislaus joined the Cumans and appealed to the Holy See, but the Pope refused to absolve him.

On Ladislaus's demand, the Cumans seized and imprisoned Philip of Fermo in early January 1280. However, Finta Aba, voivode of Transylvania captured Ladislaus and handed him over to Roland Borsa. In less than two months, both the legate and the king were set free and Ladislaus took a new oath to enforce the Cuman laws. However, many Cumans decided to leave Hungary instead of obeying the legate's demands. Ladislaus followed the moving Cumans as far as Szalánkemén (now Stari Slankamen in Serbia), but could not hinder them from crossing the frontier.

Ladislaus launched a campaign against Finta Aba and seized his castles in the summer of 1281. According to the Austrian Rhymed Chronicle, Bishop Philip of Fermo left Hungary around the same time, stating that he would never come back, "not for the sake of the Holy Father". A Cuman army invaded the southern parts of Hungary in 1282. The Illuminated Chronicle writes that Ladislaus, "like the brave Joshua, went out against" the Cumans "to fight for his people and his realm." He vanquished the invaders' army at Lake Hód, near Hódmezővásárhely, in the autumn of 1282.

At the end of 1282, Ladislaus laid siege to Borostyánkő (now Bernstein im Burgenland in Austria), which was held by the Kőszegis. The Kőszegis resisted, forcing the king to lift the siege in early 1283. Ladislaus even reconciled with Ivan Kőszegi and appointed him palatine before 6 July. Ladislaus abandoned his wife, Isabella, and settled among the Cumans by the end of the year.

=== Last years (1285–1290) ===
Cuman assassins murder Ladislaus in Körösszeg (Cheresig, Romania) on 10 July 1290

The Mongols of the Golden Horde invaded Hungary under the command of Khans Talabuga and Nogai in January 1285. According to the Illuminated Chronicle, they "spread a terrible devastation of fire throughout the whole country" to the east of the Danube. Local forces resisted the invaders at many places, including, for example, at Regéc. The invasion lasted for two months before the Mongols withdrew.

Ladislaus's favoritism towards the Cumans made him so unpopular that many of his subjects accused him of inciting the Mongols to invade Hungary. In fact, Ladislaus employed Mongol prisoners of war, known as nyögérs, when he subjugated a rebellion in the Szepesség in September 1285. The king preferred the Cumans' way of life, including their costumes and hairstyle, and took Cuman girls as his mistresses. According to Lodomer, archbishop of Esztergom, Ladislaus copulated with his favorite concubine, Aydua, whom the archbishop described as a "poisonous viper", in public.

In September 1286, Ladislaus imprisoned his wife and granted all her revenues to his mistress. Archbishop Lodomer liberated the queen the following September. The archbishop summoned the prelates, the barons, and the noblemen to an assembly in Buda and excommunicated Ladislaus. In response, the infuriated king stated that "beginning with the archbishop of Esztergom and his suffragans, I shall exterminate the whole lot right up to Rome with the aid of Tartar swords", according to Archbishop Lodomer.

The barons captured Ladislaus in the Szepesség in January 1288. Although his partisans soon liberated him, he acquiesced in concluding an agreement with Archbishop Lodomer. The archbishop absolved Ladislaus on condition that the king would live in accordance with Christian morals. However, Ladislaus broke his promise. He abducted his sister, Elizabeth, prioress of the Dominican Monastery of the Blessed Virgin on Rabbits' Island, and gave her in marriage to a Czech aristocrat, Záviš of Falkenstein. According to Archbishop Lodomer, Ladislaus even stated, "If I had 15 or more sisters in as many cloistered communities as you like, I would snatch them from there to marry them off licitly or illicitly; in order to procure through them a kin-group who will support me by all their power in the fulfillment of my will".

Ladislaus spent the last years of his life wandering from place to place. Hungary's central government lost power because the prelates and the barons ruled the kingdom independently of the monarch. For example, Ivan Kőszegi and his brothers waged wars against Albert I, Duke of Austria, but Ladislaus did not intervene, although the Austrians captured at least 30 fortresses along the western borders.

The Kőszegis offered the crown to Andrew the Venetian, who arrived in Hungary in early 1290. One of their opponents, Arnold Hahót, captured the pretender, however, and surrendered him to Duke Albert. Ladislaus appointed Mizse, who had recently converted from Islam to Christianity, palatine. Pope Nicholas IV was even planning to proclaim a crusade against Ladislaus. However, Ladislaus, who had always been partial towards his Cuman subjects, was assassinated by three Cumans, named Arbuz, Törtel, and Kemence, at the castle of Körösszeg (now Toboliu in Romania) on 10 July 1290. Mizse and the Cuman Nicholas, who was the brother of Ladislaus's Cuman lover, took vengeance for Ladislaus's death, slaughtering the murderers.

Upon Pope Nicholas IV's orders, an inquiry was carried out to find out "whether the king died as a Catholic Christian". The results of the investigation are unknown, but the Chronicon Budense writes that Ladislaus was buried in the cathedral of Csanád (now Cenad in Romania). His successor, Andrew III of Hungary, and Pope Boniface VIII recalled Ladislaus as "of renowned memory".

== Ancestors ==
Ancestors of Ladislaus IV of Hungary

16. Béla III of Hungary
8. Andrew II of Hungary
17. Agnes of Antioch
4. Béla IV of Hungary
18. Berthold, Duke of Merania
9. Gertrude of Merania
19. Agnes of Rochlitz
2. Stephen V of Hungary
10. Theodore I Laskaris
5. Maria Laskarina
22. Alexios III Angelos
11. Anna Komnene Angelina
23. Euphrosyne Doukaina Kamatera
1. Ladislaus IV of Hungary
6. Seyhan, Cuman chieftain
3. Elizabeth the Cuman

== See also ==
- Maria of Hungary (1257–1323)
- Elizabeth the Cuman
- Cuman people
- Cumania

== Bibliography ==
=== Primary sources ===
- Simon of Kéza: The Deeds of the Hungarians (Edited and translated by László Veszprémy and Frank Schaer with a study by Jenő Szűcs) (1999). CEU Press. ISBN 963-9116-31-9.
- The Hungarian Illuminated Chronicle: Chronica de Gestis Hungarorum (Edited by Dezső Dercsényi) (1970). Corvina, Taplinger Publishing. ISBN 0-8008-4015-1.

=== Secondary sources ===
- Bain, Robert Nisbet (1911). "Ladislaus IV." . In Chisholm, Hugh (ed.). Encyclopædia Britannica. Vol. 16 (11th ed.). Cambridge University Press. pp. 59–60.
- Bárány, Attila (2012). "The Expansion of the Kingdom of Hungary in the Middle Ages (1000–1490)". In Berend, Nóra (ed.). The Expansion of Central Europe in the Middle Ages. Ashgate Variorum. pp. 333–380. ISBN 978-1-4094-2245-7.
- Bartl, Július; Čičaj, Viliam; Kohútova, Mária; Letz, Róbert; Segeš, Vladimír; Škvarna, Dušan (2002). Slovak History: Chronology and Lexicon. Bolchazy-Carducci Publishers, Slovenské Pedegogické Nakladatel'stvo. ISBN 0-86516-444-4.
- Berend, Nora (2001). At the Gate of Christendom: Jews, Muslims and "Pagans" in Medieval Hungary, c. 1000 – c. 1300. Cambridge University Press. ISBN 978-0-521-02720-5.
- Engel, Pál (2001). The Realm of St Stephen: A History of Medieval Hungary, 895–1526. I.B. Tauris. ISBN 1-86064-061-3.
- Fine, John V. A. (1994) [1987]. The Late Medieval Balkans: A Critical Survey from the Late Twelfth Century to the Ottoman Conquest. Ann Arbor, Michigan: University of Michigan Press. ISBN 978-0-472-10079-8.
- Érszegi, Géza; Solymosi, László (1981). "Az Árpádok királysága, 1000–1301 [The Monarchy of the Árpáds, 1000–1301]". In Solymosi, László (ed.). Magyarország történeti kronológiája, I: a kezdetektől 1526-ig [Historical Chronology of Hungary, Volume I: From the Beginning to 1526] (in Hungarian). Akadémiai Kiadó. pp. 79–187. ISBN 963-05-2661-1.
- Klaniczay, Gábor (2002). Holy Rulers and Blessed Princes: Dynastic Cults in Medieval Central Europe. Cambridge University Press. ISBN 0-521-42018-0.
- Kontler, László (1999). Millennium in Central Europe: A History of Hungary. Atlantisz Publishing House. ISBN 963-9165-37-9.
- Kristó, Gyula; Makk, Ferenc (1996). Az Árpád-ház uralkodói [Rulers of the House of Árpád] (in Hungarian). I.P.C. Könyvek. ISBN 963-7930-97-3.
- Kristó, Gyula (1994). "IV. (Kun) László [Ladislaus IV the Cuman]". In Kristó, Gyula; Engel, Pál; Makk, Ferenc (eds.). Korai magyar történeti lexikon (9–14. század) [Encyclopedia of the Early Hungarian History (9th–14th centuries)] (in Hungarian). Akadémiai Kiadó. p. 396. ISBN 963-05-6722-9.
- Kristó, Gyula (2003). Háborúk és hadviselés az Árpádok korában [Wars and Tactics under the Árpáds] (in Hungarian). Szukits Könyvkiadó. ISBN 963-9441-87-2.
- Makk, Ferenc (1994). "Mária 2. [Mary, 2nd entry]". In Kristó, Gyula; Engel, Pál; Makk, Ferenc (eds.). Korai magyar történeti lexikon (9–14. század) [Encyclopedia of the Early Hungarian History (9th–14th centuries)] (in Hungarian). Akadémiai Kiadó. p. 444. ISBN 963-05-6722-9.
- Sălăgean, Tudor (2005). "Regnum Transilvanum. The assertion of the Congregational Regime". In Pop, Ioan-Aurel; Nägler, Thomas (eds.). The History of Transylvania, Vol. I. (until 1541). Romanian Cultural Institute (Center for Transylvanian Studies). pp. 233–246. ISBN 973-7784-00-6.
- Treadgold, Warren (1997). A History of the Byzantine State and Society. Stanford, California: Stanford University Press. ISBN 0-8047-2630-2.
- Žemlička, Josef (2011). "The Realm of Přemysl Ottokar II and Wenceslas II". In Pánek, Jaroslav; Tůma, Oldřich (eds.). A History of the Czech Lands. Charles University. pp. 106–116. ISBN 978-80-246-1645-2.
- Zsoldos, Attila (2007). Családi ügy: IV. Béla és István ifjabb király viszálya az 1260 – as években [A family affair: The Conflict between Béla IV and King-junior Stephen in the 1260s] (in Hungarian). História, MTA Történettudományi Intézete. ISBN 978-963-9627-15-4.

Ladislaus IV of Hungary House of Árpád Born: 1262 Died: 10 July 1290
Regnal titles
Preceded by Stephen V of Hungary	King of Hungary and Croatia; 1272 – 1290	Succeeded by Andrew III of Hungary
