= Voivode of Transylvania =

Official in Transylvania, 12th–16th century

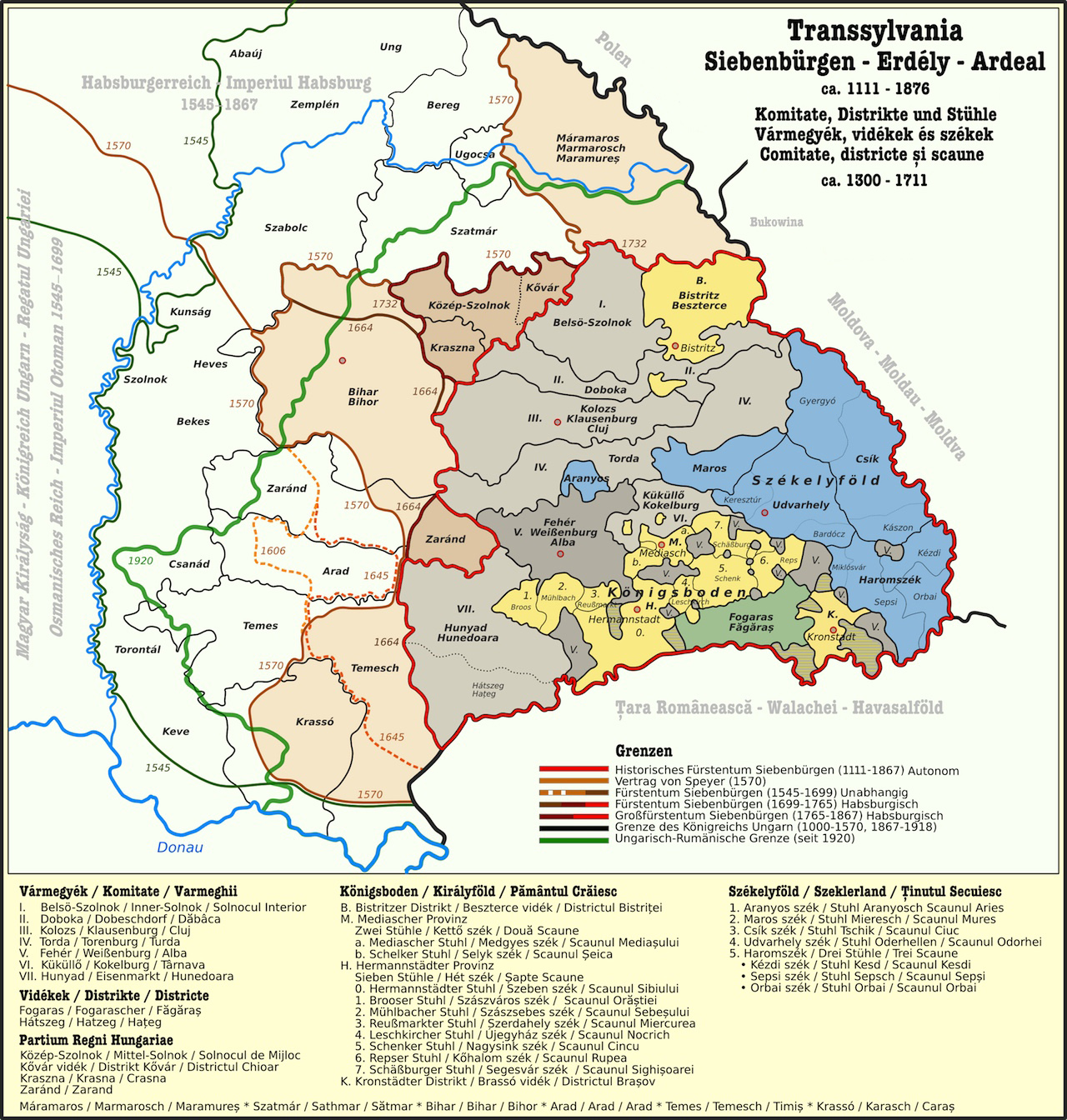
Changes in the administration of Transylvania between 1300 and 1867

Coat of arms in 1438

The Voivode of Transylvania (German: Vojwode von Siebenbürgen; Hungarian: erdélyi vajda; Latin: voivoda Transsylvaniae; Romanian: voievodul Transilvaniei) was the highest-ranking official in Transylvania within the Kingdom of Hungary from the 12th century to the 16th century. Appointed by the monarchs, the voivodes – themselves also the heads or ispáns of Fehér County – were the superiors of the ispáns of all the other counties in the province.

They had wide-ranging administrative, military and judicial powers, but their jurisdiction never covered the whole province. The Saxon and Székely communities – organized into their own districts or "seats" from the 13th century – were independent of the voivodes. The kings also exempted some Transylvanian towns and villages from their authority over the centuries. Even so, the Voivodeship of Transylvania "was the largest single administrative entity" in the entire kingdom in the 15th century. Voivodes enjoyed income from the royal estates attached to their office, but the right to "grant lands, collect taxes and tolls, or coin money" was reserved for the monarchs. Although Roland Borsa, Ladislaus Kán and some other voivodes rebelled against the sovereign, most remained faithful royal officials.

Because of the gradual disintegration of the medieval Kingdom of Hungary in the 16th century, the last voivodes of Transylvania, who came from the Báthory family, ceased to be high-ranking officials. Instead they were the heads of state, although under Ottoman suzerainty, of a new principality emerging in the eastern territories of the kingdom. Accordingly, Stephen Báthory, the voivode elected by the Diet of the new realm, officially abandoned the title of voivode and adopted that of prince in 1576, upon his election as King of Poland.

== Origins ==
The origin of the office is unclear. The title voivode is of Slavic origin with a meaning of "commander, lieutenant". Although Emperor Constantine VII Porphyrogennetos wrote of the voivodes or chieftains of the Hungarian tribes around 950, he seems to have adopted the term used by a Slavic interpreter. Romanian historians maintain that the title, homonymous with the one used in Wallachia and Moldavia, suggests a perpetuation of the local ruling tradition.

The border position of Transylvania led to the formation of the voivodeship, since the monarchs could not maintain direct control over this remote region. Thus the voivodes were never autonomous, but remained provincial officials of the kings. The voivodes were heads of Fehér County from 1201, which may indicate that their position had its origin in the office of that county's ispán.

Two royal charters issued in 1111 and 1113 mention one Mercurius "princeps Ultrasilvanus", but he may have been only an important landowner in Transylvania without holding any specific office. Leustach Rátót was the first individual whose title voivode was documented. He held the office in the late 12th century, but his voivodeship was mentioned by a royal charter in 1230. The earliest extant document mentioning a voivode named Legforus was issued in 1199. In addition to voivode, royal charters used the titles banus, dux and herzog for the same office in the next decades, showing that the terminology remained uncertain until the second half of the 13th century.

== Functions ==
=== Jurisdiction ===
The territories under the jurisdiction of the voivodes are known as Voivodeship or Voivodate of Transylvania. Voivodes were the chiefs of the ispáns of the Transylvanian counties. Although the counties in Transylvania were first attested from the 1170s, earlier references to fortresses at their seats and archaeological finds suggest that a system of counties existed in the 11th century. For instance, Torda County was first mentioned in a charter of 1227, but a royal castle at Torda (Turda) had already been documented in 1097, and three burials coin-dated to the reign of Stephen I of Hungary (1000 or 1001–1038) were unearthed in the same fortress.

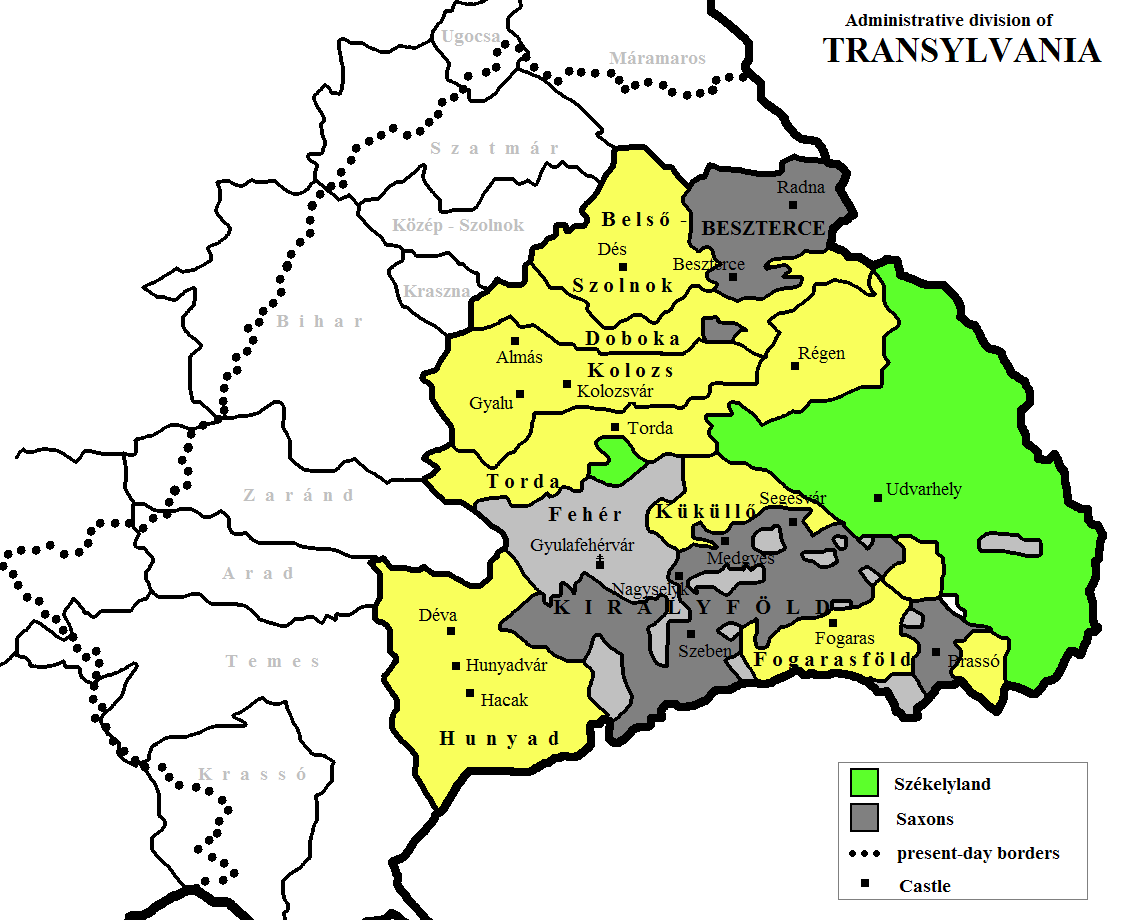
Administrative division of Transylvania in the early 16th century, the territories under the control of the Voivode depicted in yellow

The ispáns of the Transylvanian counties of Doboka, Hunyad, Kolozs, Küküllő and Torda were not listed among the witnesses of royal charters from the beginning of the 13th century, hinting that their direct connection to the monarchs had by that time been interrupted. Thereafter they were employed by the voivode who appointed and dismissed them at will. Only the heads of Szolnok County remained directly connected to the monarchs for a longer period, until their office was united with the voivodeship in the 1260s. Similarly, the voivodes were simultaneously the ispáns of the nearby Arad County between 1321 and 1412.

The kings exempted some communities from the jurisdiction of the voivodes. The Diploma Andreanum, a royal charter of 1224, placed the territory of the Saxons between Broos (Szászváros, Orăștie) and Barót (Baraolt) under the authority of the Count of Hermannstadt (Nagyszeben, Sibiu), who was appointed by and directly subordinate to the monarchs. Likewise, a special royal official, the Count of the Székelys, administered the Székely community from around 1228. In the latter case, the two offices were united by custom in 1462: from then on each voivode was also appointed Count of the Székelys.

Following the Mongol invasion of 1241 and 1242, King Béla IV of Hungary exempted the inhabitants of Bilak (Mărişelu), Gyalu (Gilău), Gyulafehérvár (Alba Iulia), Harina (Herina), Tasnád (Tășnad) and Zilah (Zalău). King Charles I of Hungary granted immunity to the Saxon communities of Birthälm (Berethalom, Biertan), Kleinschelken (Kisselyk, Şeica Mică), and Mediasch (Medgyes, Mediaș) in 1315, but the same monarch annulled other communities' similar privileges in 1324. Altrodenau (Radna, Rodna) and Bistritz (Beszterce, Bistrița) received immunity in 1366.

=== Honour of the voivodes ===
The office of voivode was one of the most important royal honours in the kingdom. All income from lands attached to the Transylvanian royal castles was collected for the voivodes. They enjoyed the income from fines, but royal revenues from taxes, tolls and mines remained the kings' due.

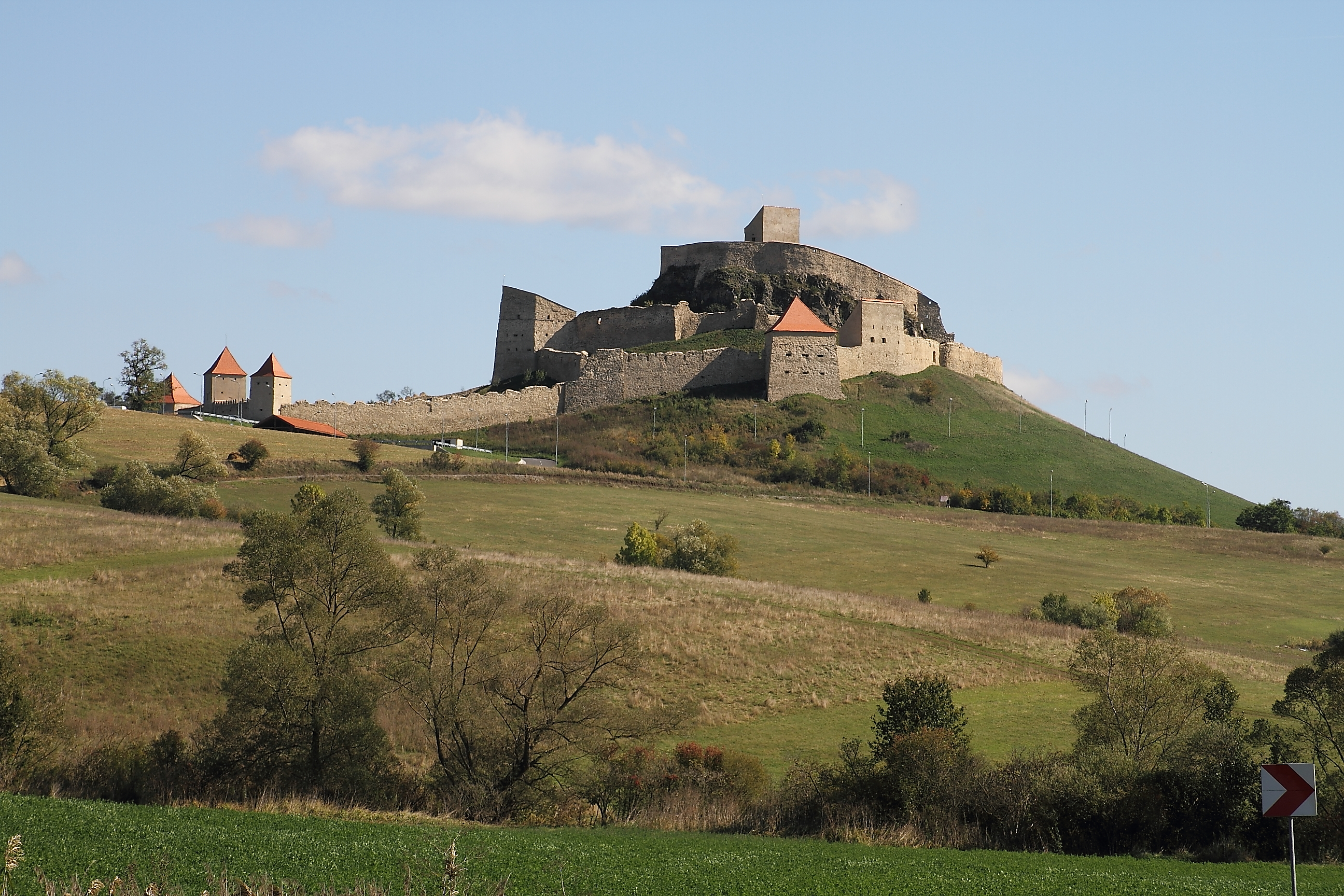
Restored Kőhalom Castle (Cetatea Cohalmului, Romania), held by the voivodes between 1324 and c. 1418

During most of the 14th century, the voivodes held the castles at Bánffyhunyad (Huedin), Boroskrakkó (Cricău), Csicsóújfalu (Ciceu-Mihăieşti), Déva (Deva), Hátszeg (Hațeg), Kőhalom (Rupea), Küküllővár (Cetatea de Baltă), Léta (Lita), Nagy-Talmács (Tălmaciu), Torja (Turia) and Újvár (Gogan Varolea), together with their lands. Additionally, the voivodes enjoyed the revenues of royal estates in Transylvania. For instance, the estates at Bonchida (Bonțida) and Vajdahunyad (Hunedoara) were attached to them for decades. However, the monarchs started to grant their castles and estates to noblemen, to the bishops of Transylvania or to the Saxon community after 1387. Consequently, Küküllővár and the lands pertaining to it remained the last piece of the "voivodal domain" in the 1450s.

The inhabitants of the Transylvanian counties were compelled to accommodate the voivodes and their officials. The "guest settlers" – privileged colonists – at Boroskrakkó, Magyarigen (Ighiu) and Romosz (Romos) were the first to be released from this duty in 1206. In Alvinc (Vinţu de Jos) and Borberek (Vurpăr), the obligation itself was not abolished, but limited to two occasions a year. Finally King Charles I exempted all Transylvanian noblemen and their serfs from this irksome duty in 1324.

The voivodes who preferred to stay in the royal court seldom resided in their province, but were represented by their deputies. The earliest record of a vicar of a voivode dates from 1221. Later the title "vice-voivode", first documented in 1278, came into general use. In addition to vice-voivodes and ispáns of the Transylvanian counties, the voivodes appointed the castellans of the royal fortresses. They tended to choose from among the noblemen serving in their own retinue, which ensured that their followers received a fair share of their revenues. Accordingly, when a king dismissed a voivode, his men were also replaced with his successor's men.

=== Judicial functions ===
Along with the palatine, the judge royal and the ban, the voivode was one of the Kingdom's highest judges. In this capacity, he was authorized to issue "credible" charters. The earliest preserved charter dates to 1248. The voivodes or their vice-voivodes always heard disputes together with local noblemen who knew local customs. Initially, the voivodes and their deputies held their courts at Marosszentimre (Sântimbru), but they heard disputes at their own abodes from the 14th century. Voivodes rarely headed their courts after the 1340s and were rather represented by their deputies.

Although limiting his own jurisdiction, in 1342 voivode Thomas Szécsényi recognized the right of Transylvanian noblemen to judge legal cases of peasants who held parcels of land in their estates, "with the exception of three cases, such as robbery, highway robbery, and violent trespass". This concession was confirmed in 1365 by King Louis I of Hungary. Furthermore, the monarchs granted jus gladii (the right to the application of capital punishment) to more and more nobles in the course of the same century.

According to customary law, noblemen could not be sued outside the province until the 15th century. King Louis I even prohibited all prelates and noblemen who owned lands in Transylvania from bringing legal proceedings of lesser importance concerning these estates to the royal court. Nevertheless, legal actions between Transylvanians and the inhabitants of other parts of the kingdom remained outside the jurisdiction of the voivodes. Litigants could appeal to the royal court against the decision of the voivode from the 14th century, but the voivode often remained involved in the proceedings. Legislation prescribed that appeals against decisions of the voivodes were to be addressed to the judge royal only from 1444.

"Then, contempt of the general diet and the noble assembly of the Transylvanians held on the mandate of the king or of the lord voivode of Transylvania is fined by a hundred marks, amounting to the same number of florins; and that of a judicial seat, by fifty."

— "Tripartitum"

"General assemblies" convoked and presided over by the principal judges of the realm became important judicial institutions in the last decade of the 13th century. General assemblies for the representatives of the Transylvanian counties were presided over by the voivode or the vice-voivode. The first such assembly was held on June 8, 1288. They became important legal institutions from 1322. Thereafter they were held on a regular basis, at least once a year at Keresztes (Cristiş) near Torda.

With the authority of the monarch, the voivodes occasionally also invited the representatives of the Saxon and Székely communities to the counties' general meetings. This contributed to the development of legal connections among the future "Three Nations of Transylvania". The threat from the peasants' revolt of 1437 gave rise to the first joint meeting of the Hungarian noblemen and the representatives of the Saxons and the Székelys, which was convoked without a former royal authorization by the vice-voivode. Romanian cneazes were only once, in 1355, invited to the general assembly. Otherwise, the vice-voivodes organized separate meetings for them.

=== Military functions ===
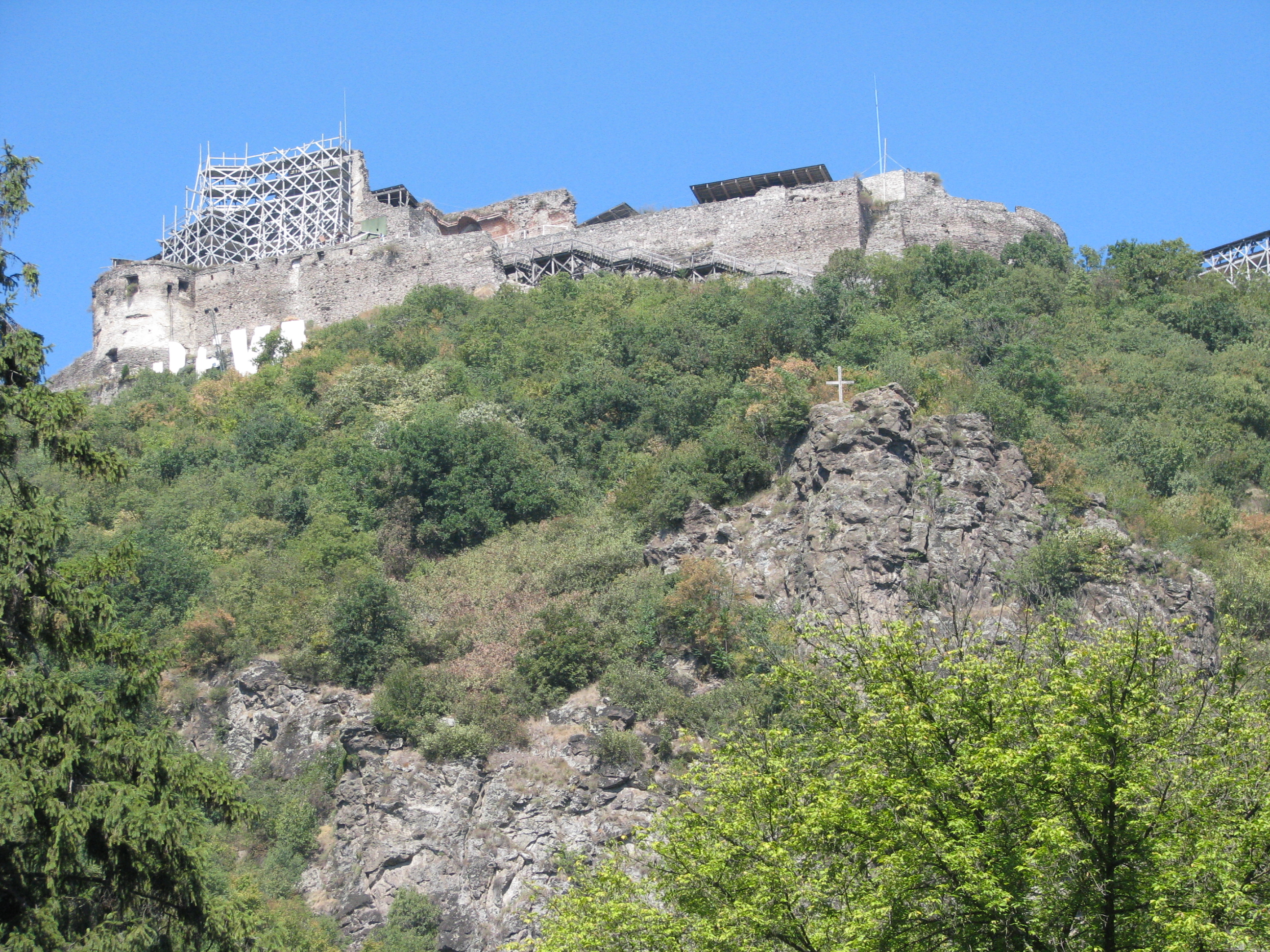
Ruins of Déva Castle (Cetatea Deva, Romania), a fortress of the voivodes from 1321 to c. 1443

The etymology of the title ("commander") suggests that voivodes had significant military duties. They were the supreme leader of the troops recruited in the counties under their jurisdiction. Although law obliged noblemen to fight in the king's army, Transylvanian nobles fought under the command of the voivode. Furthermore, the voivodes had their own private retinue, formed primarily by armed noblemen. Their right to raise an army under their own flag was confirmed by legislation in 1498.

Military functions are attested, for instance, by Pousa, the voivode at the time of the Mongol invasion who fell in battle on March 31, 1241. Voivode Lawrence of the Aba clan fought in the royal army in a war against Austria in 1246. A Mongol army attacking the southern regions of Transylvania was defeated by voivode Ernye of the Ákos clan in 1260. Roland Borsa fought against the invading Mongols in 1285.

Voivode Nicholas Csáki failed to repel an Ottoman invasion of Transylvania in 1420. In contrast, John Hunyadi, voivode between 1441 and 1446, defeated a major Ottoman army at Gyulafehérvár in 1442. His successor Stephen Báthory likewise won a resounding victory at Breadfield (Hungarian: Kenyérmező, Romanian: Câmpul Pâinii) on October 13, 1479. By contrast, John Zápolya (Szapolyai), the last voivode before the battle of Mohács on August 29, 1526, did not arrive to the battlefield in time, summoned too late. The battle ended with the Ottomans' annihilation of the royal army. King Louis II of Hungary was also killed on the battlefield.

== Monarchs and their voivodes ==
=== Appointment and dismissal ===
The voivodes had power concentrated in their hands, impelling the monarchs to replace them frequently: forty-three voivodes ruled between 1199 and 1288. Monarchs usually refrained from appointing as voivode noblemen who owned Transylvanian estates. Michael of the Kacsics clan was the first voivode to receive a land grant in the province, around 1210. However, these originally uninhabited lands along the upper courses of the river Mureș (Maros) were confiscated in 1228.

The era beginning with 1288 was characterized by longer periods in office. Roland Borsa survived 10 years, while his successor, Ladislaus Kán, lasted 20 years. This apparent stability was the consequence of the weakening of central government under the last two kings of the Árpád dynasty, Ladislaus IV (1272–1290) and Andrew III (1290–1301). Royal power was only restored in the reign of Charles I (1308–1342) who one by one defeated the rebellious noblemen throughout his kingdom.

In Transylvania, he was assisted by Thomas Szécsényi, the voivode between 1321 and 1342. Historian Ioan-Aurel Pop characterizes the following period as including "voidvodal dynasties": five members of the Lackfi family (father and four sons) were successively appointed between 1356 and 1376. Likewise, Nicholas Csáki (1415 to 1426) was succeeded by his son Ladislaus. The pair preferred to entrust their vice-voivode Roland Lépes to represent them, instead of visiting the province. From the middle of the 15th century it was not unusual for two or even three noblemen to hold the office at the same time. For instance, John Hunyadi was appointed together with Nicholas Újlaki in 1441 by King Wladislas I.

=== Cooperation and conflicts ===
The Mongols comprehensively plundered the eastern territories of the Kingdom of Hungary, including Transylvania, during both their invasion in 1241 and their withdrawal the following year. The consolidation of the province was the main task of Lawrence of the Aba clan, who the office for 10 years from 1242. One of his successors, appointed by King Béla IV, Ernye of the Ákos clan, was dismissed in 1260 by the king's son, Stephen who had just taken over Transylvania with the title of duke. The duke's action showed emerging tensions between father and son, rather than conflicts between the duke and Ernye.

The first years of the reign of the minor Ladislaus IV were characterized by armed conflicts between parties of the leading noble families. Although Roland Borsa, voivode in 1282 and between 1284 and 1294, was initially among the nobles assisting the king in consolidating royal power, he himself became the source of new conflicts. First he prevented the canons of the Gyulafehérvár Chapter from collecting their income in 1289. Next he unlawfully compelled noblemen and Saxon landowners in Transylvania to accommodate him and his retinue. Later Borsa fought the bishop of Várad (Oradea) and even resisted King Andrew III who besieged him in the fortress of Adorján (Adrian) at Szalárd (Sălard) for three months in 1294.

Borsa's successor Ladislaus Kán went even further by usurping royal prerogative during his voivodeship between 1294 and 1315. He arbitrarily assumed the titles of count of Bistritz, Hermannstadt and the Székelys to expand his authority over Saxon and Székely communities exempted from voivodal authority. He set up a tax-collecting body, seemingly covering the entire province. He captured Otto of Bavaria, a claimant to the Hungarian throne and seized the Holy Crown of Hungary from him in the first half of 1307. He handed the royal diadem to King Charles I in 1310, but continued to rule Transylvania de facto independently until his death in 1315. His son of the same name declared himself voivode, a title even used by the monarch when referring to him in a charter of August 12, 1315. Dózsa Debreceni, the voivode King Charles I appointed in 1318, defeated some rebellious minor lords, but royal authority in Transylvania was only restored by Thomas Szécsényi in the 1320s.

The next rebellion against royal power in Transylvania broke out in 1467. Irritated by a new tax that King Matthias Corvinus had just introduced, representatives of the Three Nations concluded an alliance against the monarch and declared the three incumbent voivodes (the brothers Counts John and Sigismund Szentgyörgyi and Berthold Ellerbach) their leaders. The king put down the revolt in a week, but did not sentence the three voivodes, because their active role in the revolt was never proven.

== End of the office ==
The barons did not find a compromise candidate to succeed King Louis II who perished in the battle of Mohács in 1526. First the voivode, John Szapolyai was proclaimed king by a group of nobles, but the opposing party also elected its own king, Ferdinand I, a scion of the Habsburg family, by the end of the year.

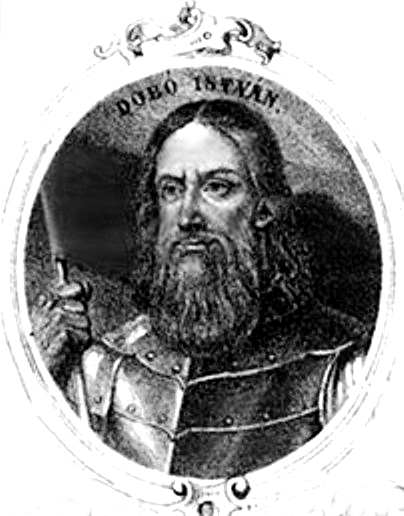
Baron István Dobó of Ruszka, last voivode appointed by a king of Hungary (1553–1559)

King John I accepted Ottoman suzerainty in 1529, but in the Treaty of Nagyvárad of 1538 he conceded the right of the Habsburgs to succeed him after his death. At that point his voivodes, Stephen Majláth and Emeric Balassa, decided to separate Transylvania from the kingdom in order to save the province from an Ottoman invasion. Although other leading Transylvanian noblemen soon joined them, King John I overcame their rebellion in some weeks.

Following John's death, Ottoman troops occupied the central parts of the Kingdom of Hungary in 1541. Sultan Suleiman I permitted the king's widow, Queen Isabella, to retain the territories east of the river Tisza (Tisa), including Transylvania, in the name of her infant son, John Sigismund. George Martinuzzi, bishop of Várad, soon started to reorganize the government in the name of the dowager queen and her son. The Ottomans assisted the bishop by capturing his opponent, Stephen Majláth, although the sultan had earlier confirmed the latter's position as voivode. An assembly of the Three Nations elected George Martinuzzi as governor on behalf of the infant king in 1542.

The office of voivode was vacant until September 1549, when Ferdinand (who had not given up the idea of reuniting the territories of the entire kingdom) appointed Martinuzzi to this post. However, Isabella and his son only left their realm in 1551. Thereafter, Transylvania was again under the rule of voivodes appointed by the monarch, ending with István Dobó. He administered the province until 1556, when Isabella and John Sigismund returned.

John Sigismund ceased to style himself king of Hungary after the Treaty of Speyer of 1570, under which he adopted the title of "Prince of Transylvania and Lord of parts of the Kingdom of Hungary". His successor Stephen Báthory (who was elected ruler by the assembly of the Three Nations) revived the title of voivode, initially for himself. He adopted the title of "prince of Transylvania" when he was elected king of Poland in 1576. At the same time, he conferred the title voivode on his brother Christopher in 1576. Christopher Báthory was followed in 1581 by his minor son Sigismund who continued to style himself voivode until the death of his uncle, Stephen Báthory in 1586. Sigismund Báthory's title of prince was acknowledged in 1595 by Emperor Rudolph (also king of Hungary).

== List of voivodes ==
=== Twelfth century ===
Term	Incumbent	Monarch	Notes	Source
c. 1111–c. 1113	Mercurius	Coloman	"princeps Ultrasilvanus", but maybe only a distinguished nobleman	
1176–c. 1196	Leustach of the Rátót clan	Béla III	first voivode attested by a royal charter (from 1230); leader of Hungarian reinforcements sent to the Byzantine Empire against the Seljuks in the Battle of Myriokephalon of 1176	
1199–1200	Legforus	Emeric	his voivode title is documented by the earliest royal charter (from 1199)	
1200	Eth of the Geregye clan	Emeric	also ispán of Fehér County	

=== Thirteenth century ===
Term	Incumbent	Monarch	Notes	Source
1201	Julius of the Kán clan	Emeric	first rule; also ispán of Fehér County	
1201	Nicholas (I)	Emeric	according to a non-authentic charter also in 1202	
1202–1206	Benedict, son of Korlát	Emeric, Ladislaus III, Andrew II	first rule	
1206	Smaragd of the Smaragd clan	Andrew II		
1208–1209	Benedict, son of Korlát	Andrew II	second rule; conspired against the king who exiled him	
1209–1212	Michael of the Kacsics clan	Andrew II	first voivode receiving land grant in Transylvania	
1212–1213	Berthold of Merania	Andrew II	brother of Gertrud, Andrew II's queen; also archbishop of Kalocsa	
1213	Nicholas (II)	Andrew II		
1214	Julius of the Kán clan	Andrew II	second rule; also ispán of Szolnok County (1214)	
1215	Simon of the Kacsics clan	Andrew II		
1216–1217	Ipoch of the Bogátradvány clan	Andrew II		
1217	Raphael	Andrew II	he might have been in office in 1218 (Kurt W. Treptow, Marcel Popa)	
1219–1221	Neuka	Andrew II		
1221–1222	Paul, son of Peter	Andrew II		
1227	Pousa, son of Sólyom	Andrew II	first rule	
1229–1231	Julius of the Rátót clan	Andrew II		
1233–1234	Denis of the Türje clan	Andrew II		
1235	Andrew, son of Serafin	Béla IV	also ispán of Pozsony County (1235)	
1235–1241	Pousa, son of Sólyom	Béla IV	second rule; died fighting against the invading Mongols	
1242–1252	Lawrence	Béla IV	also ispán of Valkó County	
b. 1261	Ernye of the Ákos clan	Béla IV	banus quondam Transiluanus in 1261	
1261	Csák of the Hahót clan	Béla IV	banus Transilvanus; also ispán of Szolnok County (1261); the king's son, Stephen is duke of Transylvania	
1263–1264	Ladislaus (II) of the Kán clan	Béla IV	first rule; also ispán of Szolnok County (1263–1264); the king's son, Stephen is duke of Transylvania	
1267–1268	Nicholas of the Geregye clan	Béla IV	first rule; also ispán of Szolnok County (1267–1268); it is presumable, he held the dignity uninterruptedly from 1264 to 1270; the king's son, Stephen is duke of Transylvania	
1270–1272	Matthew of the Csák clan	Stephen V	first rule; also ispán of Szolnok County (1270–1272)	
1272–1273	Nicholas of the Geregye clan	Ladislaus IV	second rule; also ispán of Szolnok County (1272–1273)	
1273	John	Ladislaus IV	also ispán of Szolnok County (1273)	
1273–1274	Nicholas of the Geregye clan	Ladislaus IV	third rule; also ispán of Szolnok County (1273–1274)	
1274	Matthew of the Csák clan	Ladislaus IV	second rule; also ispán of Szolnok County (1274)	
1274	Nicholas of the Geregye clan	Ladislaus IV	fourth rule; maybe in 1275 (Kurth W. Treptow, Marcel Popa); also ispán of Szolnok County (1274)	
1274–1275	Matthew of the Csák clan	Ladislaus IV	third rule; also ispán of Szolnok County (1274–1275)	
1275	Ugrin of the Csák clan	Ladislaus IV	first rule; also ispán of Szolnok County (1275)	
1275–1276	Ladislaus (II) of the Kán clan	Ladislaus IV	second rule; also ispán of Szolnok County (1275–1276)	
1276	Ugrin of the Csák clan	Ladislaus IV	second rule; also ispán of Szolnok County (1276)	
1276	Matthew of the Csák clan	Ladislaus IV	fourth rule; also ispán of Szolnok County (1276)	
1277	Nicholas of the Pok clan (Meggyesi)	Ladislaus IV	first rule; also ispán of Szolnok County (1277)	
1278–1280	Finta of the Aba clan	Ladislaus IV	also ispán of Szolnok County (1278–1280); captured the king	
1280	Stephen, son of Tekesh	Ladislaus IV	also ispán of Szolnok County (1280)	
1282	Roland of the Borsa clan	Ladislaus IV	first rule; also ispán of Szolnok County (1282)	
1283	Apor of the Péc clan	Ladislaus IV	also ispán of Szolnok County (1283)	
1284–1294	Roland of the Borsa clan	Ladislaus IV, Andrew III	second rule; also ispán of Szolnok County (1284–1294); successfully fought against the invading Mongols in 1285; rebelled against both kings	
1287–c. 1288 (?)	Mojs of the Ákos clan	Ladislaus IV	only a non-authentic charter refers to him as voivode, if so, he was also ispán of Szolnok County in the same period	
1295–1314 or 1315	Ladislaus (III) of the Kán clan	Andrew III	de facto independent ruler; also ispán of Szolnok County (1295–1314)	

=== Fourteenth century ===
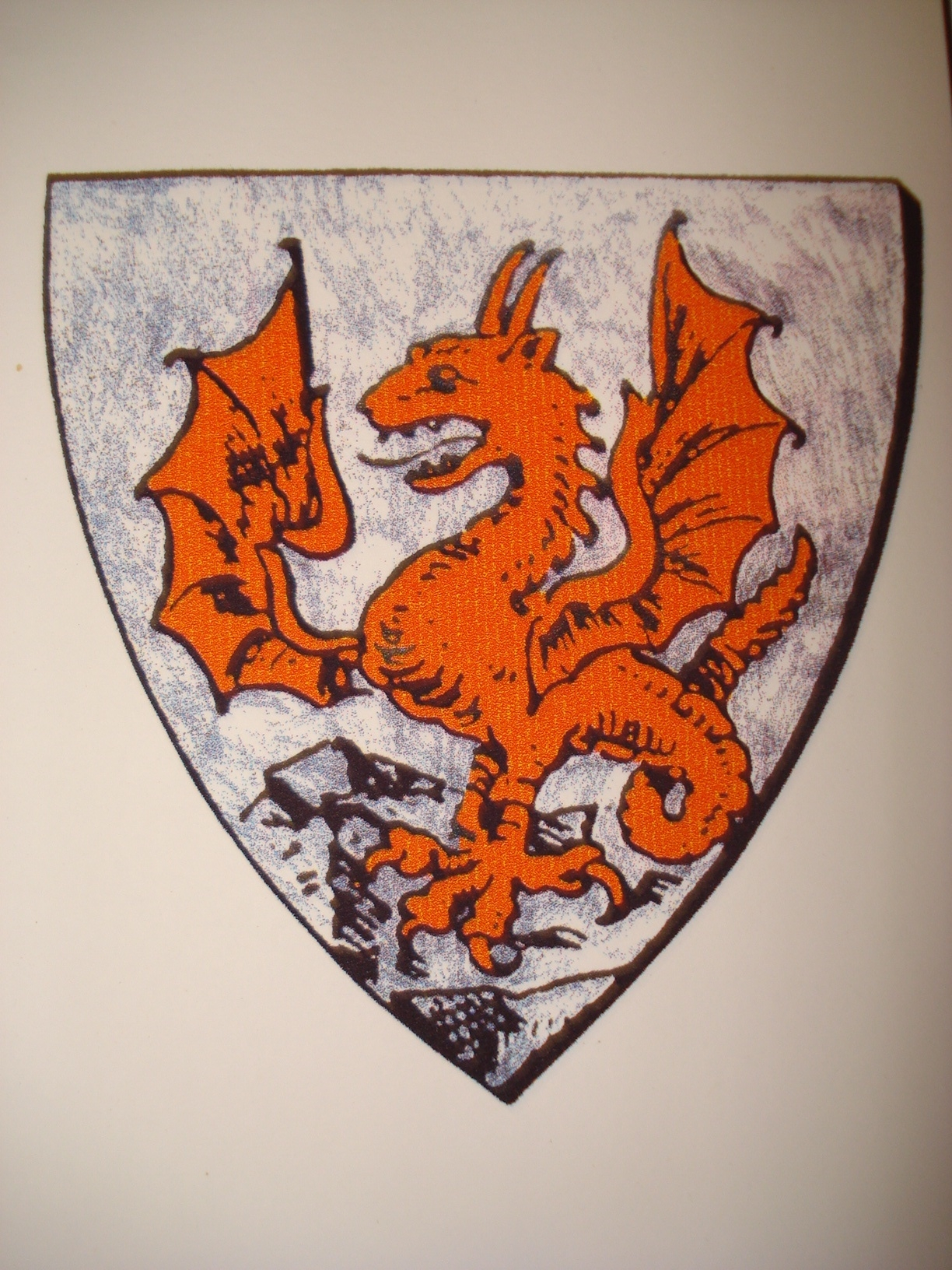
Coat-of-arms of the Lackfi family

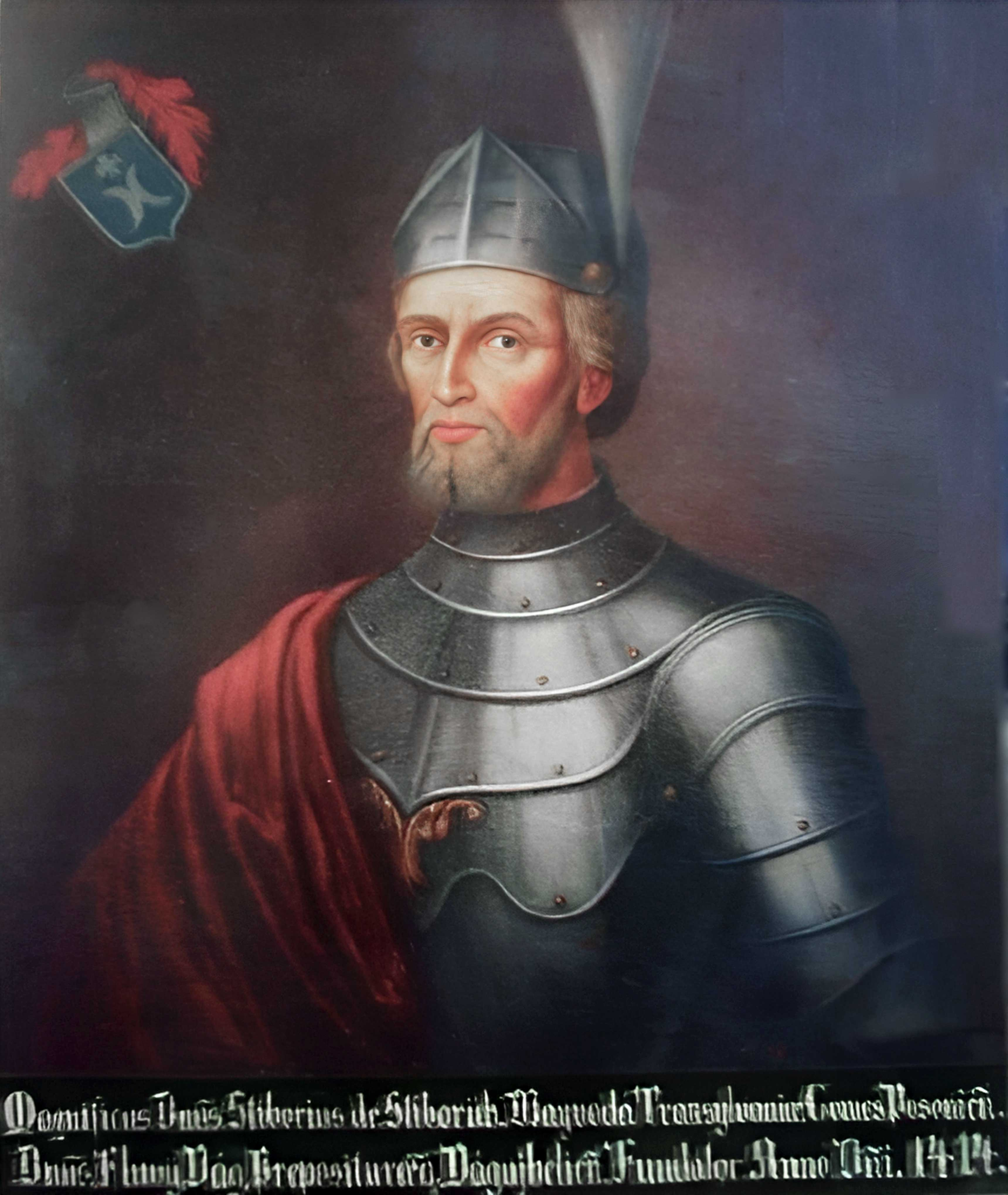
Stibor of Stiboricz

Term	Incumbent	Monarch	Notes	Source
c. 1315	Ladislaus (IV) of the Kán clan		self declared voivode, son of Ladislaus (III) Kán (1295–1314)	
1315–1316	Nicholas Meggyesi	Charles I	second rule; unable to take up his office; also ispán of Szolnok County (1315–1316)	
1318–1321	Dózsa Debreceni	Charles I	also ispán of Szolnok County (1318–1321)	
1321–1342	Thomas Szécsényi	Charles I	also ispán of Szolnok County (1321–1342), ispán of Arad County (1330–1342), and ispán of Csongrád County (1330)	
1342–1344	Nicholas Sirokai	Louis I	also ispán of Arad and Szolnok Counties (1342–1344)	
1344–1350	Stephen Lackfi	Louis I	also ispán of Arad and Szolnok Counties (1344–1350)	
1350–1351	Thomas Gönyűi or Csór	Louis I	appointed by Stephen, duke of Transylvania, the monarch's brother; also ispán of Arad and Szolnok Counties (1350–1351)	
1351–1356	Nicholas Kont of Orahovica	Louis I	also ispán of Arad and Szolnok Counties (1351–1356)	
1356–1359	Andrew Lackfi	Louis I	brother of Stephen Lackfi (1344–1350); also ispán of Arad and Szolnok Counties (1356–1359)	
1359–1367	Denis Lackfi	Louis I	son of Stephen Lackfi (1344–1350); also ispán of Arad and Szolnok Counties (1359–1367)	
1367–1368	Nicholas Lackfi Jr.	Louis I	son of Stephen Lackfi (1344–1350); also ispán of Arad and Szolnok Counties (1367–1368)	
1369–1372	Emeric Lackfi	Louis I	son of Stephen Lackfi (1344–1350); also ispán of Arad and Szolnok Counties (1369–1372)	
1372–1376	Stephen Lackfi of Csáktornya	Louis I	first rule; son of Stephen Lackfi (1344–1350); also ispán of Szolnok County (1372–1376)	
1376–1385	Ladislaus Losonci Sr.	Louis I, Mary	first rule; also ispán of Szolnok County (1376–1385)	
1385–1386	Stephen Lackfi of Csáktornya	Charles II	second rule; also ispán of Szolnok County (1385–1386)	
1386–1392	Ladislaus Losonci Sr.	Sigismund, Mary	second rule; also ispán of Szolnok County (1386–1392)	
1392–1393	Emeric Bebek	Sigismund, Mary	also ispán of Szolnok County (1392–1393)	
1393–1395	Frank Szécsényi	Sigismund, Mary	also ispán of Arad, Csongrád, and Szolnok Counties (1393–1395)	
1395–1401	Stibor of Stiboricz	Sigismund	first rule; also ispán of Arad and Szolnok Counties (1395–1401)	

=== Fifteenth century ===
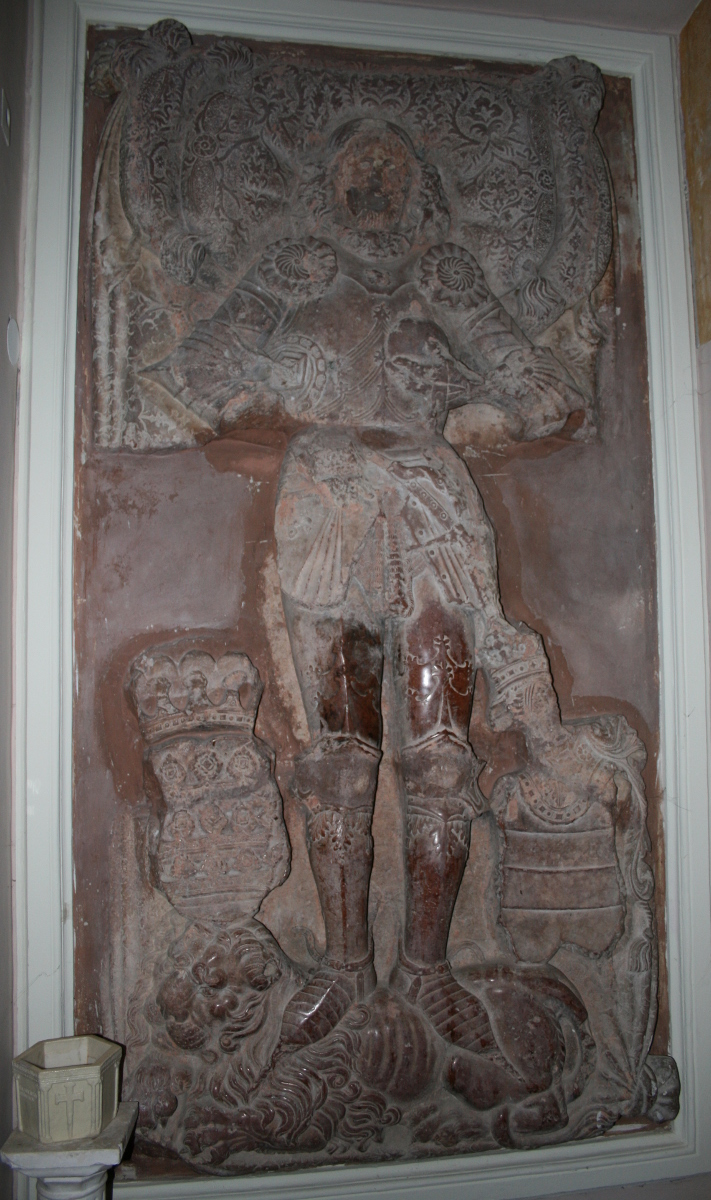
Gravestone of Nicholas Újlaki in the Church of St. John of Capistrano at Újlak (Ilok, Croatia)

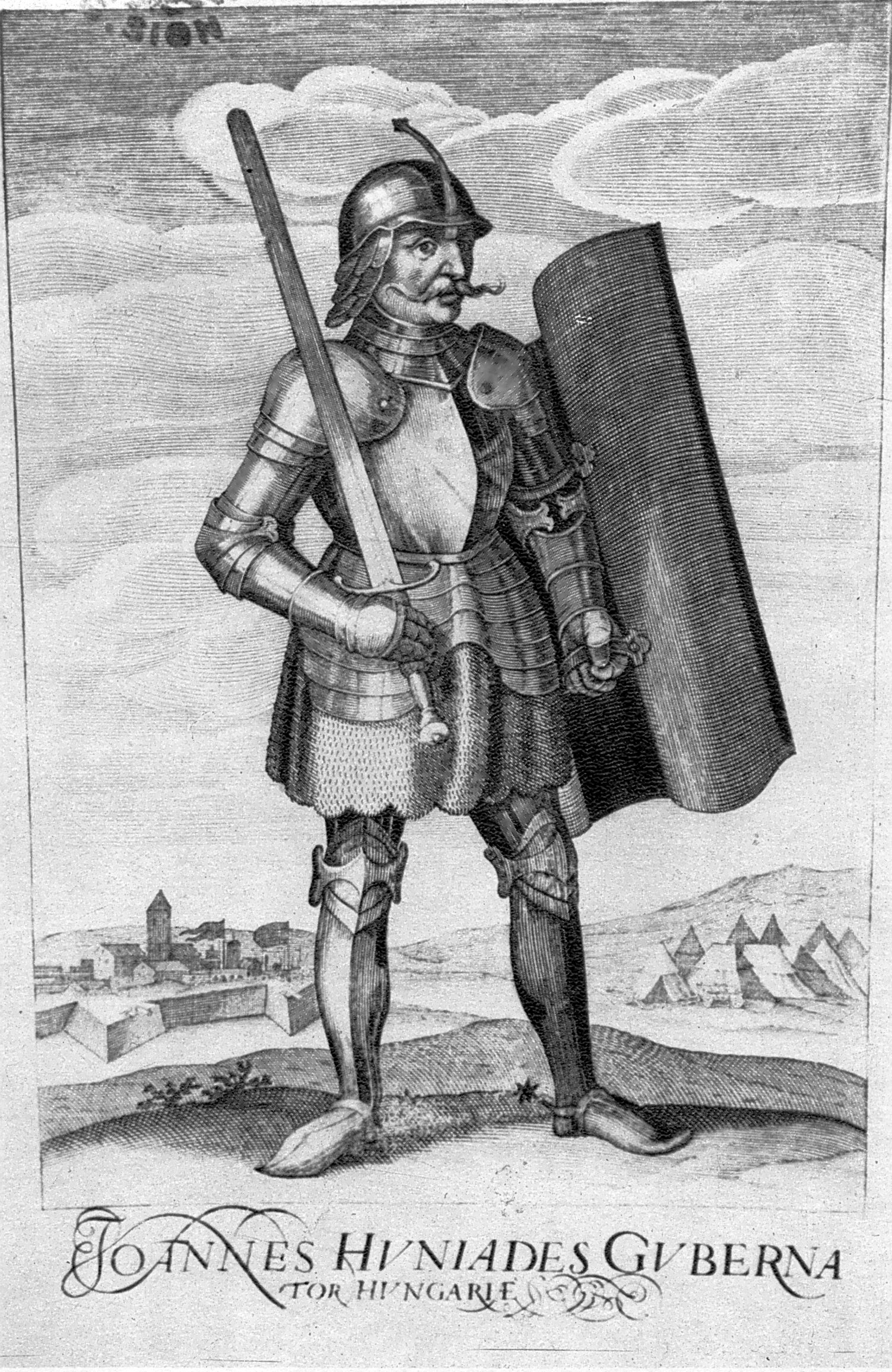
John Hunyadi on an engraving

Term	Incumbent	Monarch	Notes	Source
1401	Simon Szécsényi	Sigismund	also ispán of Szolnok County (1401)	
1402–1403	Nicholas Csáki	Sigismund	first rule; also ispán of Békés, Bihar, Csanád, Csongrád, Keve, Krassó, Szolnok, Temes, and Zaránd Counties (1402–1403); a leader of the party supporting King Ladislaus of Naples's claim to the Hungarian throne in 1403	
1402–1403	Nicholas Marcali	Sigismund	also ispán of Békés, Csanád, Csongrád, Keve, Krassó, Szolnok, Temes, and Zaránd Counties (1402–1403); joined the party supporting King Ladislaus of Naples's claim to the Hungarian throne in 1403	
1403–1409	John Tamási	Sigismund	also ispáns of Szolnok County (1403–1409)	
1403–1409	James Lack of Szántó	Sigismund	also ispáns of Szolnok County (1403–1409)	
1409–1414	Stibor of Stiboricz	Sigismund	second rule; also ispán of Szolnok County (1409–1414), Nyitra and Trencsén, Lord of all Váh	
1415–1426	Nicholas Csáki	Sigismund	second rule; also ispán of Békés, Bihar, and Szolnok Counties (1415–1426)	
1426–1437	Ladislaus Csáki	Sigismund	second rule; together with Peter Cseh of Léva (1436–1437); also ispán of Közép-Szolnok County (1426–1437), ispán of Szatmár County (1430–1437), and ispán of Bihar County (1433–1437); routed by the rebelling peasants at Dés (Dej);	
1436–1438	Peter Cseh of Léva	Sigismund, Albert	together with Ladislaus Csáki (1426–1437)	
1438–1441	Desiderius Losonci	Albert, Ladislaus V	left Ladislaus V's party and became Wladislas I's partisan in 1441	
1440–1441	Ladislaus Jakcs	Wladislas I		
1440–1441	Michael Jakcs	Wladislas I		
1441–1458	Nicholas Újlaki	Wladislas I, Ladislaus V	first rule; together with John Hunyadi (1441–1446), with Emeric Bebek (1446–1448), and with John Rozgonyi (1449–1458); also ban of Macsó and commander of Nándorfehérvár (Beograd, Serbia) (1441–1458), count of the Székelys (1441–1446), ispán of Csanád, Csongrád, Máramaros, and Temes Counties (1441–1446), ispán of Arad County (1444–1446), ban of Severin (1445–1446), and ban of Slavonia (1457)	
1441–1446	John Hunyadi	Wladislas I	together with Nicholas Újlaki (1441–1458); also commander of Nándorfehérvár (Beograd, Serbia) (1441–1446), count of the Székelys (1441–1446), ispán of Csanád, Csongrád, and Temes Counties (1441–1446), ispán of Arad and Bihar Counties (1443–1446), ispán of Közép-Szolnok, Kraszna, Szabolcs, Szatmár, and Ugocsa Counties (1444–1446), ispán of Bereg and Máramaros Counties (1445–1446), and regent-governor of the Kingdom of Hungary (1446)	
1446–1448	Emeric Bebek	elected by the Diet of Hungary	together with Nicholas Újlaki (1441–1458); also ispán of Abaúj County (1446–1448) and judge of the Jász people (1446–1448); died fighting against the Ottomans in the second battle of Kosovo	
1449–1458	John Rozgonyi		first rule; together with Nicholas Újlaki (1441–1458); also ispán of Sopron and Vas Counties (1449–1454), count of the Székelys (1457–1458)	
1459–1461	Ladislaus Kanizsai	Matthias	together with John and Sebastian Rozgonyi (1459–1460), and with his brother, Nicholas Kanizsai (1461)	
1459–1460	John Rozgonyi	Matthias	together with Ladislaus Kanizsai (1459–1461), and with Sebastian Rozgonyi (1459–1460)	
1459–1460	Sebastian Rozgonyi	Matthias	together with Ladislaus Kanizsai (1459–1461), and with John Rozgonyi (1459–1460)	
1461	Nicholas Kanizsai	Matthias	together with his brother, Ladislaus Kanizsai (1459–1461)	
1462–1465	Nicholas Újlaki	Matthias	second rule	
1462–1465	John Pongrác of Dengeleg	Matthias	first rule	
1465–1467	Bertold Ellerbach of Monyorókerék	Matthias	dismissed after rebellious Transylvanian nobles elected them to their leaders	
1465–1467	Count Sigismund Szentgyörgyi	Matthias	brothers of Count Peter Szentgyörgyi (1498–1510); dismissed after rebellious Transylvanian nobles elected them to their leaders	
1465–1467	Count John Szentgyörgyi	Matthias	brothers of Count Peter Szentgyörgyi (1498–1510); dismissed after rebellious Transylvanian nobles elected them to their leaders	
1468–1474	Nicholas Csupor of Monoszló	Matthias	together with John Pongrác of Dengeleg (1468–1472)	
1468–1472	John Pongrác of Dengeleg	Matthias	second rule; together with Nicholas Csupor of Monoszló (1468–1474)	
1472–1475	Blaise Magyar	Matthias	leader of Hungarian reinforcements sent to Stephen the Great, prince of Moldavia in the Battle of Vaslui of 1475	
1475–1476	John Pongrác of Dengeleg	Matthias	third rule	
1478–1479	Peter Geréb of Vingárt	Matthias		
1479–1493	Stephen (V) Báthory of Ecsed	Matthias, Wladislas II		
1493–1498	Bartholomew Drágfi of Béltek	Wladislas II	together with Ladislaus Losonci Jr. (1493–1494); suppressed a rebellion of the Székelys	
1493–1495	Ladislaus Losonci Jr.	Wladislas II	together with Bartholomew Drágfi of Béltek (1493–1498)	
1498–1510	Count Peter Szentgyörgyi	Wladislas II	brother of Counts Sigismund and John Szentgyörgyi (1465–1467)	

=== Sixteenth century ===
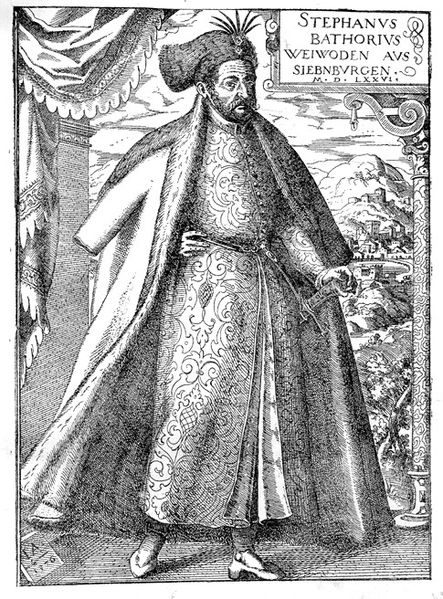
Stephen Báthory

"Voivode of Transylvania, István Báthory! (...) Transylvania has long been under my protection, (...) and the country is my own (...). Therefore, out of my power, in accordance with your fealty to me I make Transylvania over to you."

— Ahidnâme of 1571 to Stephen Báthory by Sultan Selim II

Term	Incumbent	Monarch	Notes	Source
1510–1526	John Zápolya (Szapolyai)	Wladislas II, Louis II	became king of Hungary	
1527–1529	Péter Perényi	John Zápolya	left John Zápolya's party and became a partisan of Ferdinand I	
1530–1534	Stephen (VIII) Báthory of Somlyó	Ferdinand I		
1530	Bálint Török			
1530–1534	Jerome Laski	John Zápolya	conspired against the king, who imprisoned him	
1533–1534	Emeric Czibak			
1534–1540	Stephen Majláth of Szunyogszeg	John Zápolya	together with Emeric Balassa of Gyarmat (1538–1540); planned to secede Transylvania from the Kingdom of Hungary, but was captured by the Ottomans	
1538–1540	Emeric Balassa of Gyarmat	John Zápolya	together with Stephen Majláth of Szunyogszeg (1534–1540); fled when the Ottomans invaded Transylvania	
1551	George Martinuzzi	Ferdinand I	also elected governor of Transylvania on behalf of the minor John Sigismund, the elected king (1543–1551)	
1552–1553	Andrew Báthory of Ecsed	Ferdinand I	resigned	
1553–1556	Stephen Dobó	Ferdinand I	last voivodes appointed by a king of Hungary	
1553–1556	Francis Kendi	Ferdinand I	last voivodes appointed by a king of Hungary	
1571–1576	Stephen Báthory		elected by the Three Nations and confirmed by the Ottoman Sultan Selim II; declared himself prince of Transylvania after his election as king of Poland in 1576	
1576–1581	Christopher Báthory	Stephen Báthory		
1581–1586	Sigismund Báthory	Stephen Báthory	last voivode; his title of prince of Transylvania confirmed in 1595 by Emperor Rudolph	

== See also ==
- Vice-voivode of Transylvania
- Ban of Croatia
- Ban of Slavonia
- Governor of Transylvania
- Palatine (Kingdom of Hungary)
- Transylvania in the Middle Ages
- List of rulers of Transylvania
- List of chancellors of Transylvania

== Sources ==
=== Primary sources ===
- Constantine Porphyrogenitus: De Administrando Imperio (Greek text edited by Gyula Moravcsik, English translation b Romillyi J. H. Jenkins) (1967). Dumbarton Oaks Center for Byzantine Studies. ISBN 0-88402-021-5.
- Stephen Werbőczy: The Customary Law of the Renowned Kingdom of Hungary in Three Parts (1517) (Edited and translated by János M. Bak, Péter Banyó and Martyn Rady with an introductory study by László Péter) (2005). Charles Schlacks Jr. Publishers. ISBN 1-884445-40-3.

=== Secondary sources ===
- Barta, Gábor (1994). "The Emergence of the Principality and its First Crises (1526–1606)". In Köpeczi, Béla; Barta, Gábor; Bóna, István; Makkai, László; Szász, Zoltán; Borus, Judit (eds.). History of Transylvania. Akadémiai Kiadó. pp. 247–300. ISBN 963-05-6703-2.
- Bóna, István (1994). "The Hungarian–Slav Period (895–1172)". In Köpeczi, Béla; Barta, Gábor; Bóna, István; Makkai, László; Szász, Zoltán; Borus, Judit (eds.). History of Transylvania. Akadémiai Kiadó. pp. 109–177. ISBN 963-05-6703-2.
- (in Hungarian) C. Tóth, Norbert; Horváth, Richárd; Neumann, Tibor; Pálosfalvi, Tamás (2016). Magyarország világi archontológiája, 1458–1526, I. Főpapok és bárók [Secular Archontology of Hungary, 1458–1526, Volume I: Prelates and Barons] (in Hungarian). MTA Bölcsészettudományi Kutatóközpont Történettudományi Intézete. ISBN 978-963-4160-35-9.
- Curta, Florin (2006). Southeastern Europe in the Middle Ages, 500–1250. Cambridge University Press. ISBN 978-0-521-89452-4.
- (in Hungarian) Engel, Pál (1996). Magyarország világi archontológiája, 1301–1457, I. ("Secular Archontology of Hungary, 1301–1457, Volume I"). História, MTA Történettudományi Intézete. Budapest. ISBN 963-8312-44-0.
- Engel, Pál (2001). The Realm of St Stephen: A History of Medieval Hungary, 895–1526. I.B. Tauris Publishers. ISBN 1-86064-061-3.
- (in Hungarian) Fallenbüchl, Zoltán (1988). Magyarország főméltóságai ("High Dignitaries in Hungary"). Maecenas Könyvkiadó. ISBN 963-02-5536-7.
- Felezeu, Călin (2009). "The International Political Background (1541–1699)". In: Pop, Ioan-Aurel; Nägler, Thomas & Magyari, András, The History of Transylvania, Vol. II. (From 1541 to 1711). Romanian Academy, Center for Transylvanian Studies. ISBN 978-973-7784-43-8.
- Jefferson, John (2012). The Holy Wars of King Wladislas and Sultan Murad. Brill Academic Publishers, ISBN 978-90-04-21904-5
- (in Hungarian) Kristó, Gyula (1979). A feudális széttagolódás Magyarországon ("Feudal Anarchy in Hungary"). Akadémiai Kiadó. ISBN 963-05-1595-4
- Kristó, Gyula (2003). Early Transylvania (895–1324). Lucidus Kiadó. ISBN 963-9465-12-7.
- Makkai, László (1994). "The Emergence of the Estates (1172–1526)". In: Köpeczi, Béla (editor), History of Transylvania. Akadémiai Kiadó. ISBN 963-05-6703-2.
- Mályusz, Elemér (1994). "Hungarian nobles of medieval Transylvania". In: Bak, János M., Nobilities in Central and Eastern Europe: Kinship, Property and Privilege. Hajnal István Alapítvány & Medium Aevum Quotidianum Gesellschaft. ISBN 963-04-2014-7.
- (in Hungarian) Markó, László (2000). A magyar állam főméltóságai Szent Istvántól napjainkig: Életrajzi Lexikon ("Great Officers of State in Hungary from King Saint Stephen to Our Days: A Biographical Encyclopedia"). Magyar Könyvklub. ISBN 963-547-085-1
- (in Romanian) Negrău, Elisabeta (2011). Cultul suveranului sud-est european şi cazul Ţării Româneşti: O perspectivă artistică [=The Southeastern European Sovereigns' Cult in the Case of Wallachia: An Artistic Approach]. Lumen. ISBN 978-973-166-274-9.
- Pop, Ioan-Aurel (1996). Romanians and Hungarians from the 9th to the 14th century: the genesis of the Transylvanian medieval state. Center for Transylvanian Studies. ISBN 973-577-037-7
- Pop, Ioan-Aurel (2005). "Romanians in the 14th–16th Centuries: From the 'Christian Republic' to the 'Restoration of Dacia'". In: Pop, Ioan-Aurel & Bolovan, Ioan, History of Romania: Compendium. Romanian Cultural Institute (Center for Transylvanian Studies). ISBN 978-973-7784-12-4.
- Rady, Martyn (2000). Nobility, Land and Service in Medieval Hungary. Palgrave (in association with School of Slavonic and East European Studies, University College London). ISBN 0-333-80085-0.
- Sedlar, Jean W. (1994). East Central Europe in the Middle Ages, 1000–1500. University of Washington Press. ISBN 0-295-97290-4.
- Sălăgean, Tudor (2005). "Romanian Society in the Early Middle Ages (9th–14th Centuries AD)". In: Pop, Ioan-Aurel & Bolovan, Ioan, History of Romania: Compendium. Romanian Cultural Institute (Center for Transylvanian Studies). ISBN 978-973-7784-12-4.
- (in Hungarian) Stipta, István (1997). A magyar bírósági rendszer története ("History of the Hungarian Judicial System"). Multiplex Media-Debrecen University Press. ISBN 963-04-9197-4.
- Szegedi, Edit (2009). "The birth and evolution of the Principality of Transylvania (1541–1690)". In: Pop, Ioan-Aurel; Nägler, Thomas & Magyari, András, The History of Transylvania, Vol. II. (From 1541 to 1711). Romanian Academy, Center for Transylvanian Studies. ISBN 978-973-7784-43-8.
- Treptow, Kurt W. & Popa, Marcel (1996). Historical Dictionary of Romania. Scarecrow Press, Inc. ISBN 0-8108-3179-1.
- (in Hungarian) Zsoldos, Attila (2011). Magyarország világi archontológiája, 1000–1301 ("Secular Archontology of Hungary, 1000–1301"). História, MTA Történettudományi Intézete. Budapest. ISBN 978-963-9627-38-3.
