= Neuka =

Voivode of Transylvania

Voivode of Transylvania
- Reign: 1219–1221
- Predecessor: Raphael
- Successor: Paul, son of Peter
- Died: after 1221

Neuka (died after 1221) was a Hungarian distinguished nobleman, who served as voivode of Transylvania between 1219 and 1221, during the reign of Andrew II of Hungary.

Before his voivodeship, Neuka served as ispán (comes) of Bihar County from 1216 to 1217.

== Sources ==
- Engel, Pál (2001). The Realm of St Stephen: A History of Medieval Hungary, 895-1526. I.B. Tauris Publishers. ISBN 1-86064-061-3.
- (in Hungarian) Markó, László (2006). A magyar állam főméltóságai Szent Istvántól napjainkig – Életrajzi Lexikon ("The High Officers of the Hungarian State from Saint Stephen to the Present Days – A Biographical Encyclopedia") (2nd edition); Helikon Kiadó Kft., Budapest; ISBN 963-547-085-1.
- (in Hungarian) Zsoldos, Attila (2011). Magyarország világi archontológiája, 1000–1301 ("Secular Archontology of Hungary, 1000–1301"). História, MTA Történettudományi Intézete. Budapest. ISBN 978-963-9627-38-3

Political offices
Preceded by Raphael	Voivode of Transylvania; 1219–1221	Succeeded by Paul, son of Peter
