= Ladislaus IV Kán =

Hungarian lord

Ladislaus (IV) Kán

Voivode of Transylvania self-declared
- Reign: c. 1315
- Predecessor: Ladislaus III Kán
- Successor: Nicholas Pok
- Noble family: gens Kán
- Father: Ladislaus III

Ladislaus (IV) from the kindred Kán (Hungarian: Kán nembeli (IV.) László) was a Hungarian lord, a member of the gens Kán (clan) and the son of oligarch Ladislaus III Kán, who was the de facto ruler of Transylvania from 1295 until his death.

After his father's death in 1314 or 1315, Ladislaus IV declared himself the Voivode of Transylvania, a title even acknowledged by King Charles I of Hungary in a charter dated 12 August 1315. The monarch’s appointed voivode, Nicholas Pok, was unable to take office. However, Ladislaus IV's power was soon challenged by another rebellious lord, Mojs II Ákos, the son-in-law of James Borsa. Mojs II defeated Voivode Pok, who had led a royal campaign against the Transylvanian oligarchs.

In 1317, the Kán brothers suffered a significant defeat in the Battle of Déva. By 1321, Charles I’s newly appointed voivode, Thomas Szécsényi, captured Csicsó (present-day Ciceu-Corabia, Romania), which was the last stronghold of Ladislaus Kán's sons. Despite this, the Kán brothers (Ladislaus IV and his brother Ladislaus V) remained a serious threat to royal authority through continuous looting and raids until the late 1320s. They also enjoyed the support of Basarab I of Wallachia.

== Ancestors ==
Ancestors of Ladislaus IV Kán

16. Julius I Kán
8. Ladislaus I Kán
17. Helena N
4. Ladislaus II Kán
2. Ladislaus III Kán
1. Ladislaus IV Kán

== Sources ==
- Bárány, Attila (2011). "Debreceni Dózsa küzdelme a bihari oligarchákkal [Dózsa Debreceni's Struggle with Oligarchs in Bihar]". In Bárány, Attila; Papp, Klára; Szálkai, Tamás. Debrecen város 650 éves. Várostörténeti tanulmányok. University of Debrecen, Történelmi Intézet. pp. 75–126.
- Kristó, Gyula (2003). Early Transylvania (895–1324). Lucidus Kiadó. ISBN 963-9465-12-7.

Ladislaus IV Genus Kán Born: ? Died: ?
Political offices
Preceded by Ladislaus III Kán	Voivode of Transylvania self-declared c. 1315	Succeeded by Nicholas Pok
