= Szalók (genus) =

Hungarian noble family

Szalók was a line of Hungarian nobles (Clan Szalók) in the medieval Kingdom of Hungary. The first known ancestor of the family Baja was mentioned by a royal charter in 1183. Their earliest realm was located at the village of Szalók, Heves county.

The members of the clan often bore the title of count in the 14th century.

The Balai, Bessenyey of Nagybessenye, Podhorányi from Liptó county, Dormánházy, Erdőteleky, Farnosy, Disznós of Kerecsény and Szalóky of Tiszaszalók families belong to this genus.

== Notable members of the clan ==
- Raphael of Transylvania
