= Pousa, son of Sólyom =

Hungarian nobleman

Voivode of Transylvania
- Reign: 1227; 1235–1241
- Predecessor: Paul, son of Peter (1st term); Andrew, son of Serafin (2nd term)
- Successor: Julius Rátót (1st term); Lawrence (2nd term)
- Died: 31 March 1241; Burzenland
- Father: Sólyom

Pousa, son of Sólyom (Hungarian: Sólyom fia Pósa; died 31 March 1241) was a Hungarian nobleman, who served as voivode of Transylvania twice, in 1227 and 1235 to 1241.

Pousa served as ispán (comes) of Vas County in 1225. During the reign of Andrew II, he was a faithful supporter of crown prince Béla, who held the title of Duke of Transylvania after 1226, following the agreement between the king and his son after a series of conflicts for the throne. Sometime Duke Béla acted independently of his father, as it is demonstrated by his grant of tax exemption to Transylvanian knights in 1231 and by his donation of lands situated in Wallachia in 1233. Pousa served as master of the treasury (camerarius) for Béla in 1225.

He was appointed voivode of Transylvania in 1227. According to László Markó, he held the office between 1226 and 1229, however existing charters only prove the term of voivodeship in 1227. He served as master of the horse for duke Béla between 1229 and 1233.

When Béla ascended the throne in 1235, Pousa was appointed voivode of Transylvania for the second time. In 1241, Transylvania suffered during the Mongol invasion of Europe. Güyük Khan invaded the province from the Oituz Pass in March. Voivode Pousa fought them with his royal army near Burzenland (Hungarian: Barcaság), where he fell in battle on 31 March 1241. The Mongols continued their campaign toward the interior of the Kingdom of Hungary.

== Sources ==
- Curta, Florin (2006). Southeastern Europe in the Middle Ages, 500-1250. Cambridge University Press. ISBN 978-0-521-89452-4.
- Engel, Pál (2001). The Realm of St Stephen: A History of Medieval Hungary, 895-1526. I.B. Tauris Publishers. ISBN 1-86064-061-3.
- Kristó, Gyula (2003). Early Transylvania (895–1324). Lucidus Kiadó. ISBN 963-9465-12-7.
- (in Hungarian) Markó, László (2006). A magyar állam főméltóságai Szent Istvántól napjainkig – Életrajzi Lexikon ("The High Officers of the Hungarian State from Saint Stephen to the Present Days – A Biographical Encyclopedia") (2nd edition); Helikon Kiadó Kft., Budapest; ISBN 963-547-085-1.
- (in Hungarian) Zsoldos, Attila (2011). Magyarország világi archontológiája, 1000–1301 ("Secular Archontology of Hungary, 1000–1301"). História, MTA Történettudományi Intézete. Budapest. ISBN 978-963-9627-38-3

Political offices
Preceded by Paul, son of Peter	Voivode of Transylvania; 1227	Succeeded by Julius Rátót
Preceded by Andrew, son of Serafin	Voivode of Transylvania; 1235–1241	Succeeded by Lawrence
