= Raphael of Transylvania =

Hungarian nobleman

Raphael

Voivode of Transylvania
- Reign: 1217
- Predecessor: Ipoch Bogátradvány
- Successor: Neuka
- Died: after 1217
- Noble family: gens Szalók
- Issue: 1 son

Raphael or Raphain (Hungarian: Rafael or Rafain; died after 1217) was a Hungarian distinguished nobleman, who served as voivode of Transylvania in 1217, during the reign of Andrew II of Hungary. He might have been also in office in 1218.

According to László Markó, he was originated from the gens Szalók. Before his voivodeship, Raphael served as ispán (comes) of Küküllő County in 1214.

== Sources ==
- Engel, Pál (2001). The Realm of St Stephen: A History of Medieval Hungary, 895-1526. I.B. Tauris Publishers. ISBN 1-86064-061-3.
- (in Hungarian) Markó, László (2006). A magyar állam főméltóságai Szent Istvántól napjainkig – Életrajzi Lexikon ("The High Officers of the Hungarian State from Saint Stephen to the Present Days – A Biographical Encyclopedia") (2nd edition); Helikon Kiadó Kft., Budapest; ISBN 963-547-085-1.
- Treptow, Kurt W. & Popa, Marcel (1996). Historical Dictionary of Romania. Scarecrow Press, Inc. ISBN 0-8108-3179-1.
- (in Hungarian) Zsoldos, Attila (2011). Magyarország világi archontológiája, 1000–1301 ("Secular Archontology of Hungary, 1000–1301"). História, MTA Történettudományi Intézete. Budapest. ISBN 978-963-9627-38-3

Political offices
Preceded by Ipoch Bogátradvány	Voivode of Transylvania; 1217	Succeeded by Neuka
