= Paul, son of Peter =

Hungarian nobleman

Voivode of Transylvania
- Reign: 1221–1222
- Predecessor: Neuka
- Successor: Pousa, son of Sólyom
- Died: after 1222

Paul, son of Peter (Hungarian: Péter fia Pál; died after 1222) was a Hungarian distinguished nobleman, who served as voivode of Transylvania between 1221 and 1222, during the reign of Andrew II of Hungary. The first known vice-voivode, Bocha held the office in 1221, during Paul's reign.

Before his voivodeship, Paul served as ispán (comes) of Csanád County from 1220 to 1221.

== Sources ==
- Engel, Pál (2001). The Realm of St Stephen: A History of Medieval Hungary, 895-1526. I.B. Tauris Publishers. ISBN 1-86064-061-3.
- Kristó, Gyula (2003). Early Transylvania (895–1324). Lucidus Kiadó. ISBN 963-9465-12-7.
- (in Hungarian) Markó, László (2006). A magyar állam főméltóságai Szent Istvántól napjainkig – Életrajzi Lexikon ("The High Officers of the Hungarian State from Saint Stephen to the Present Days – A Biographical Encyclopedia") (2nd edition); Helikon Kiadó Kft., Budapest; ISBN 963-547-085-1.
- (in Hungarian) Zsoldos, Attila (2011). Magyarország világi archontológiája, 1000–1301 ("Secular Archontology of Hungary, 1000–1301"). História, MTA Történettudományi Intézete. Budapest. ISBN 978-963-9627-38-3

Political offices
Preceded by Neuka	Voivode of Transylvania; 1221–1222	Succeeded by Pousa, son of Sólyom
