= Ipoch Bogátradvány =

Hungarian nobleman

Voivode of Transylvania
- Reign: 1216–1217
- Predecessor: Simon Kacsics
- Successor: Raphael
- Died: after 1222
- Noble family: gens Bogátradvány

Ipoch from the kindred Bogátradvány (Ypoch; Hungarian: Bogátradvány nembeli Ipoch; died after 1222) was a Hungarian distinguished nobleman from the gens Bogátradvány, which, according to historian Simon of Kéza, was originated from Bohemia.

During the dynastic feud, he supported Emeric. He served as ispán (comes) of Bács County between 1202 and 1204. After that he was appointed ban of Slavonia for King Emeric in 1204. He received the estate of Zsurk, Szabolcs County from the king.

After the death of Emeric and Andrew II's accession to the throne, Ipoch lost his political influence for a long time. He was able to enter the smaller council of the king next time only in 1216, when he was appointed voivode of Transylvania. He held that office until 1217. According to László Markó, he was awarded the dignity of ban of Slavonia in 1222, when the secular nobles were temporarily came to power after the adoption of the Golden Bull of 1222.

== Sources ==
- Engel, Pál (2001). The Realm of St Stephen: A History of Medieval Hungary, 895-1526. I.B. Tauris Publishers. ISBN 1-86064-061-3.
- (in Hungarian) Markó, László (2006). A magyar állam főméltóságai Szent Istvántól napjainkig – Életrajzi Lexikon ("The High Officers of the Hungarian State from Saint Stephen to the Present Days – A Biographical Encyclopedia") (2nd edition); Helikon Kiadó Kft., Budapest; ISBN 963-547-085-1.
- (in Hungarian) Zsoldos, Attila (2011). Magyarország világi archontológiája, 1000–1301 ("Secular Archontology of Hungary, 1000–1301"). História, MTA Történettudományi Intézete. Budapest. ISBN 978-963-9627-38-3

Political offices
Preceded by Martin Hont-Pázmány	Ban of Slavonia; 1204	Succeeded by Mercurius
Preceded by Simon Kacsics	Voivode of Transylvania; 1216–1217	Succeeded by Raphael
