= Andrew, son of Serafin =

Hungarian baron and landowner

Judge royal
- Reign: 1239–1241
- Predecessor: Julius Rátót
- Successor: Paul Geregye
- Died: 11 April 1241; Muhi, Kingdom of Hungary
- Father: Serafin

Andrew, son of Serafin (Hungarian: Szerafin fia András; died 11 April 1241) was a Hungarian baron and landowner, who held several secular positions during the reign of kings Andrew II and Béla IV.

His influence arose during the reign of Andrew II. He was a supporter of prince Béla, thus he held functions in the princely court. He served as master of the stewards for Béla twice, in 1225 and from 1231 to 1233. According to László Markó, he was the ispán (comes) of Borsod County in 1230. He was the last voivode for Andrew II in 1235, when Béla held the title of duke of Transylvania. After Béla IV ascended the throne in 1235, he was replaced by Pousa, son of Sólyom. Andrew functioned as ispán of Pozsony County between 1235 and 1240 (or 1241).

In 1239, he was nominated judge royal by Béla IV. He was killed in the Battle of Mohi on 11 April 1241 and later replaced by Paul Geregye.

== Sources ==
- Engel, Pál (2001). The Realm of St Stephen: A History of Medieval Hungary, 895–1526. I.B. Tauris Publishers. ISBN 1-86064-061-3.
- (in Hungarian) Markó, László (2006). A magyar állam főméltóságai Szent Istvántól napjainkig – Életrajzi Lexikon ("The High Officers of the Hungarian State from Saint Stephen to the Present Days – A Biographical Encyclopedia") (2nd edition); Helikon Kiadó Kft., Budapest; ISBN 963-547-085-1.
- (in Hungarian) Zsoldos, Attila (2011). Magyarország világi archontológiája, 1000–1301 ("Secular Archontology of Hungary, 1000–1301"). História, MTA Történettudományi Intézete. Budapest. ISBN 978-963-9627-38-3

Political offices
Preceded by Denis Türje	Voivode of Transylvania; 1235	Succeeded by Pousa, son of Sólyom
Preceded by Julius Rátót	Judge royal 1239–1241	Succeeded by Paul Geregye
