= Ladislaus III Kán =

Hungarian oligarch

Ladislaus (III) Kán

Voivode of Transylvania
- Reign: 1295–1314 (or 1315)
- Predecessor: Roland Borsa
- Successor: Nicholas Pok
- Born: Unknown
- Died: before 13 May 1315
- Noble family: gens Kán
- Spouse: unknown
- Issue: Ladislaus IV; Ladislaus V a daughter
- Father: Ladislaus II

Ladislaus (III) Kán (? – before 13 May 1315) (Hungarian: Kán (III) László, Romanian: Ladislau Kán al III-lea), was a Hungarian oligarch in the Kingdom of Hungary who ruled de facto independently Transylvania. He held the office of Voivode of Transylvania (erdélyi vajda) (1295–1314 or 1315). Taking advantage of the internal discords within the kingdom, he could maintain his rule over Transylvania until his death even by struggling against the several claimants for the throne.

== His life ==
Ladislaus Kán belonged to the Transylvanian branch of the kindred Kán which was founded by Ladislaus' great-grandfather Julius I Kán. There is no information on his early life, but he was one of the three sons of Ladislaus II, who held the office of judge royal (országbíró). His father died in or after 1278 and he inherited his possessions: Hosszúaszó (today Valea Lungă in Romania), Szépmező (today Șona in Romania), Bun (today Boiul Mare in Romania), Mezőszilvás, Septér (today Şopteriu in Romania) and Mezőörményes (today Urmeniş in Romania). By 1280, Ladislaus had been legally an adult and capable person. It is possible that a certain Ladislaus who sold his village Vasary in 1290, is identical with Ladislaus Kán.

Ladislaus Kán appeared in the sources in 1297 when he issued a charter; by that time, he had been holding the office of Voivode of Transylvania, i.e., he had been governing that province of the Kingdom of Hungary. Ladislaus replaced Roland Borsa in that position, who, initially loyal to the royal power, became the source of new conflicts and rebelled against his monarch, as a result, he was dismissed. At that time, Ladislaus must have been one of the partisans of King Andrew III of Hungary (1290–1301), because he attended an assembly convocated by the king in Buda in 1298 and he was a member of the king's Council in 1299. Following the king's death, when several claimants for the throne were struggling with each other between 1301 and 1308, he probably did not intervene in their conflict. Nevertheless, during the period from 1297 until 1313, the kings of Hungary granted several possessions to him in the eastern parts of the kingdom, e.g., he received Veresegyháza (today Roşia de Secaş in Romania) before 1313.

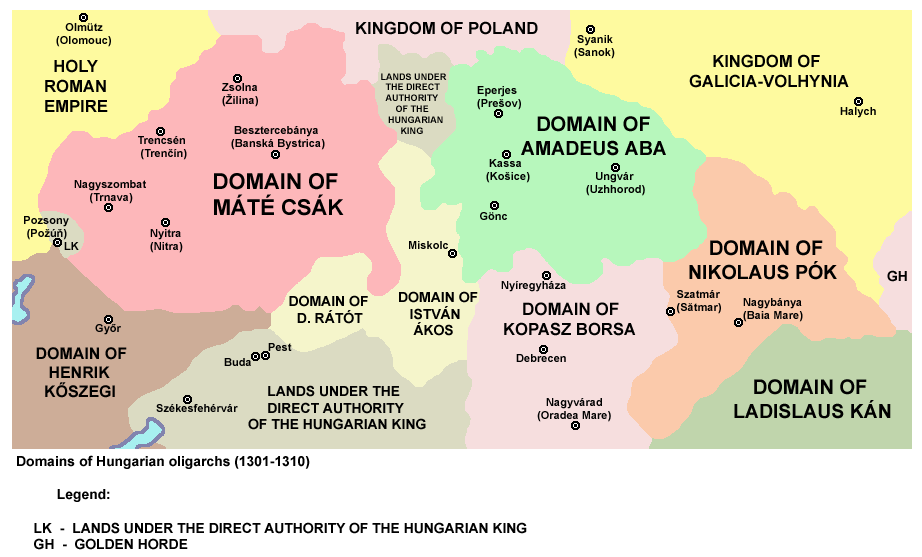
Ladislaus III Kán ruled de facto independently Transylvania until his death

The oligarchic provinces in the early 14th century

Although he did not take part in the internal conflicts of the kingdom, he endeavoured to strengthen his authority, sometimes by using or abusing his office of Voivode of Transylvania. Moreover, he managed to expand his influence over several territories of the Transylvanian Saxons (who had been exempted from the Voivodes' jurisdiction before) and he usurped the office of the Counts of the Székelys (and therefore, he also gained control over the Székelys). He occupied the silver mine of Altrodna (today Rodna in Romania); and he extended his properties even beyond Transylvania when he captured several possessions in Arad, Csanád and Krassó counties. It can be seen that Ladislaus Kán came into the possession of a considerable part of his properties by force and tyrannical means.

When (in 1306) he was reluctant to recognise the rule of King Charles I of Hungary, whose claim had been supported by the Popes, Pope Clement V ordered Vincent, the archbishop of Kalocsa to excommunicate Ladislaus and to place his territory under ecclesiastic interdict. In 1307, the archbishop of Kalocsa held out the prospect of the same ecclesiastic disciplinary actions against Peter Monoszló, bishop of Transylvania in case he would not excommunicate Ladislaus Kán who had seized the properties of the prelate of Kalocsa. Nevertheless, in the summer of 1307, Ladislaus Kán captured King Otto of Hungary, a rival of King Charles I, during his visit to Transylvania, and had him imprisoned in one of his castles. It happened then that the royal crown of Hungary fell into his hands.

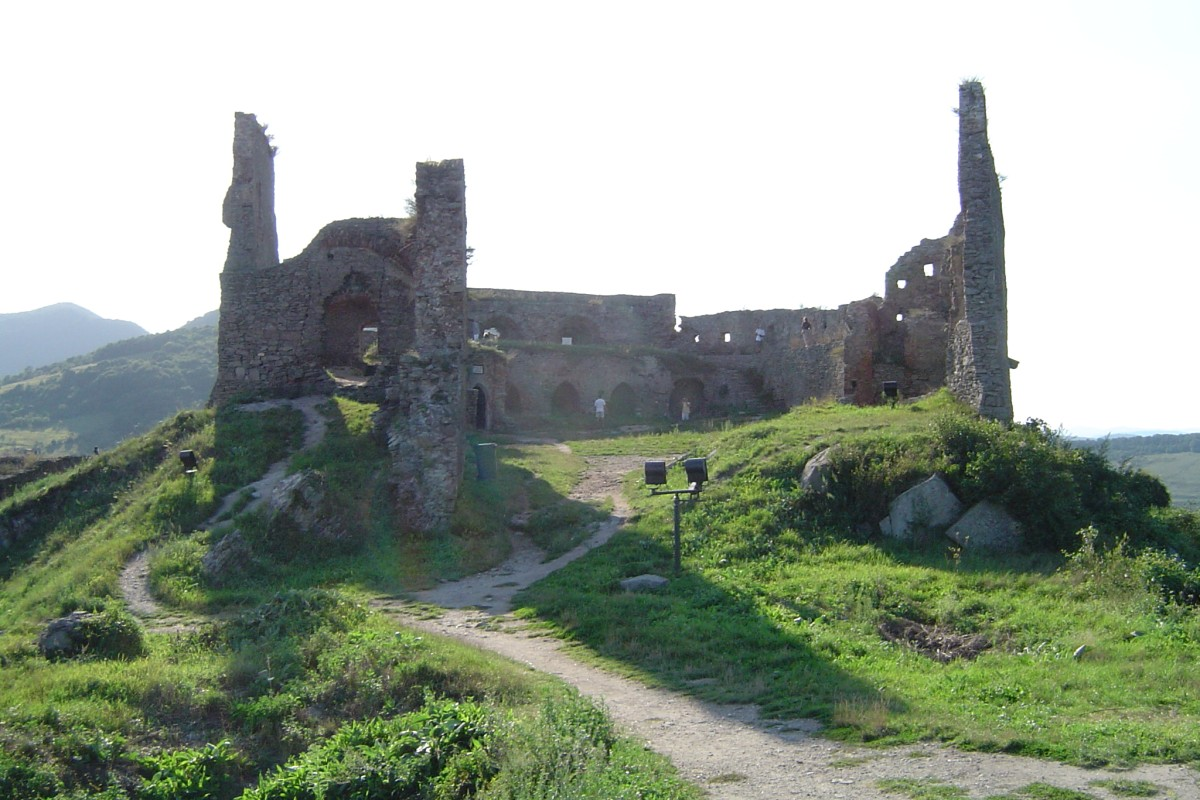
Ruins of Déva (Deva) Castle, his domain's centre

When Bishop Peter of Transylvania died, on 27 November 1307, Ladislaus Kán captured the canons who had assembled to elect the new bishop; moreover, he demanded that one of his sons be elected and occupied the chapter's possessions. Although, in July 1308, he declared that he would not maintain his son's claim to the bishopric, he suggested two new candidates to the canons. By July 1309, the threatened canons were yielding to extortion and elected Benedict, a former councillor of Peter, as the new Bishop of Transylvania.

In the autumn of 1308, he sent delegates to take part in the assembly held close to Pest, where the prelates and the barons of the kingdom recognised King Charles. He released King Otto in the same year and handed him over to Ugrin Csák (a most loyal man of King Charles) in Szeged. In the meanwhile, he married off his daughter to the "heretic" (that is, of Orthodox faith) son of Stefan Uroš II Milutin, the king of Serbia.

At that time, Cardinal Gentile Portino da Montefiore arrived in Hungary as the pope's legate and launched his operations both to prevent the marriage of the Voivode's daughter and to recover the crown. It was a sign of his failure that he did declare the excommunication of Ladislaus Kán on 25 December 1309. Because of the pressure on him, the Voivode was constrained to acknowledge King Charles I as his sovereign in a charter of his (issued in Szeged, on 8 April 1310). Moreover, he pledged to return the crown before July 1 (he fulfilled the promise) and vowed to give back a number of properties and offices he had seized with force, i.e., Ladislaus Kán himself assumed the obligation of giving up the office of the count of Bistritz (today Bistriţa in Romania) and Hermannstadt (today Sibiu in Romania) and the dignity of the count of the Székelys.

In sign of their reconciliation, King Charles visited Transylvania in December 1310, for the first time during his reign. The relations between the king and Ladislaus Kán must have returned to normal lastingly, since one of his property exchanges took place in the presence of the king in June 1313. This is the last occurrence of Ladislaus Kán who died probably in the end of 1314 or the beginning of 1315 (this is quite likely since royal charters follow one another starting from March 1315, in which King Charles returned the properties having occupied with force by the late Voivode to their rightful owners). Following Ladislaus' death, his elder namesake son, Ladislaus IV Kán declared himself Voivode and rebelled against Charles I.

== Ancestors ==
Ancestors of Ladislaus III Kán

8. Julius I Kán
4. Ladislaus I Kán
9. Helena N
2. Ladislaus II Kán
1. Ladislaus III Kán

== Sources ==
- Engel, Pál (1996). Magyarország világi archontológiája, 1301–1457, I. [Secular Archontology of Hungary, 1301–1457, Volume I] (in Hungarian). História, MTA Történettudományi Intézete. ISBN 963-8312-44-0.
- Hunyadi, Sándor (2021). "Az erdélyi püspökség és székeskáptalan Kán László vajdasága alatt [The Chapter and the Diocese of Transylvania in the reign of Ladislaus Kán, Voivode of Transylvania]". Belvedere Meridionale (in Hungarian). 33 (1): 19–46. doi:10.14232/belv.2021.1.3. ISSN 1419-0222.
- Kádár, Tamás (2017). "Harcban a koronáért. (II.) I. Károly (Róbert) király uralkodásának 1306–1310 közötti szakasza [Fight for the Crown. The Reign of Charles I (Robert) from 1306 to 1310]". Történeti Tanulmányok. Acta Universitatis Debreceniensis (in Hungarian). 25: 126–192. ISSN 1217-4602.
- Kristó, Gyula (1979). A feudális széttagolódás Magyarországon [Feudal Anarchy in Hungary] (in Hungarian). Akadémiai Kiadó. ISBN 963-05-1595-4.
- Kristó, Gyula (1983). "Kán László és Erdély [Ladislaus Kán and Transylvania]". Tanulmányok az Árpád-korról (in Hungarian). Magvető Könyvkiadó. pp. 269–299. ISBN 963-271-890-9.
- Kristó, Gyula (1996). "Erdély 1315-ben [Transylvania in 1315]". In Kovács, András; Sipos, Gábor; Tonk, Sándor (eds.). Emlékkönyv Jakó Zsigmond születésének nyolcvanadik évfordulójára (in Hungarian). Erdélyi Múzeum Egyesület. pp. 281–288. ISBN 973-96946-7-5.
- Kristó, Gyula (2003). Early Transylvania (895–1324). Lucidus Kiadó. ISBN 963-9465-12-7.
- Markó, László (2006). A magyar állam főméltóságai Szent Istvántól napjainkig: Életrajzi Lexikon [Great Officers of State in Hungary from King Saint Stephen to Our Days: A Biographical Encyclopedia] (in Hungarian). Helikon Kiadó. ISBN 963-208-970-7.
- Sălăgean, Tudor (2007). Un voievod al Transilvaniei: Ladislau Kán 1294–1315 [A Voivode of Transylvania: Ladislaus Kán 1294–1315] (in Romanian). Argonaut. ISBN 978-973-109-070-2.
- Sălăgean, Tudor (2016). Transylvania in the Second Half of the Thirteenth Century: The Rise of the Congregational System. East Central and Eastern Europe in the Middle Ages 450–1450. Vol. 37. Leiden and Boston: Brill. ISBN 978-90-04-24362-0.
- Zsoldos, Attila (2011). Magyarország világi archontológiája, 1000–1301 [Secular Archontology of Hungary, 1000–1301] (in Hungarian). História, MTA Történettudományi Intézete. ISBN 978-963-9627-38-3.

Ladislaus III Genus Kán Born: ? Died: before 13 May 1315
Political offices
Preceded by Roland Borsa	Voivode of Transylvania; 1295–1314/5	Succeeded by Nicholas Meggyesi
