= Lawrence of Transylvania =

Hungarian nobleman and military leader

Lawrence

Voivode of Transylvania
- Reign: 1242–1252
- Predecessor: Pousa, son of Sólyom
- Successor: Ernye Ákos
- Died: 1265 or 1266
- Issue: Lawrence II

Lawrence (Hungarian: Lőrinc; died 1265 or 1266) was a Hungarian distinguished nobleman and military leader, who served as voivode of Transylvania between 1242 and 1252.

== Background ==
His origin is uncertain; Tudor Sălăgean assigned him to the kindred Aba, however, according to Pál Engel, he belonged to the Illyéd branch of the gens Kán. He had a son from his unidentified wife, Lawrence II, who served as master of the cupbearers (1272–1273; 1274) and ban of Severin (1279; 1291).

Lawrence was first mentioned by contemporary records in the first regnal year (1235) of Béla IV of Hungary, when he functioned as ispán (comes) of Fejér County. In 1238, a charter in a connection with donation from Andrew II of Hungary, referred to him as "former" (tunc temporis) ispán, which implies Lawrence maybe already held that office during the end of Andrew's reign. He served as ispán of Bihar County between 1236 and 1238. He was appointed master of the cupbearers and ispán for the stablemen (Hungarian: lovászispán; Latin: comes agasonum) in 1240.

After the Mongol invasion (1241–1242), where voivode Pousa, son of Sólyom died, the consolidation of the province of Transylvania was the main task of Lawrence, who was appointed voivode by Béla IV and held the office for 10 years from 1242. He also fought in the royal army in a war against Austria in 1246 and participated in the battle of the Leitha River, where Frederick the Quarrelsome was killed. Besides his voivodeship, Lawrence also functioned as ispán of Valkó County from 1248 to 1252.

In the 1260s, factional conflicts in gaining the throne saw him supporting junior king Stephen, who rebelled against his father's rule and governed Transylvania independently from Béla IV, holding the title of duke of Transylvania. Consequently, Lawrence served as master of the treasury for Stephen between 1263 and 1265. He was appointed ban of Severin (Hungarian: Szörény) in 1263, where Stephen also exercised the royal rights.

== Sources ==
- Engel, Pál (2001). The Realm of St Stephen: A History of Medieval Hungary, 895-1526. I.B. Tauris Publishers. ISBN 1-86064-061-3.
- (in Hungarian) Markó, László (2006). A magyar állam főméltóságai Szent Istvántól napjainkig – Életrajzi Lexikon ("The High Officers of the Hungarian State from Saint Stephen to the Present Days – A Biographical Encyclopedia") (2nd edition); Helikon Kiadó Kft., Budapest; ISBN 963-547-085-1.
- Sălăgean, Tudor (2005). "Romanian Society in the Early Middle Ages (9th–14th Centuries AD)". In: Pop, Ioan-Aurel & Bolovan, Ioan, History of Romania: Compendium. Romanian Cultural Institute (Center for Transylvanian Studies). ISBN 978-973-7784-12-4.
- (in Hungarian) Zsoldos, Attila (2011). Magyarország világi archontológiája, 1000–1301 ("Secular Archontology of Hungary, 1000–1301"). História, MTA Történettudományi Intézete. Budapest. ISBN 978-963-9627-38-3

Political offices
| Preceded by Baldwin Rátót | Master of the cupbearers 1240 | Succeeded by Roland Rátót |
| Preceded by Pousa, son of Sólyom | Voivode of Transylvania; 1242–1252 | Succeeded by Ernye Ákos |
| Preceded by Lawrence | Ban of Severin; 1263 | Succeeded by Alexander Karászi |
