= Egerszalók =

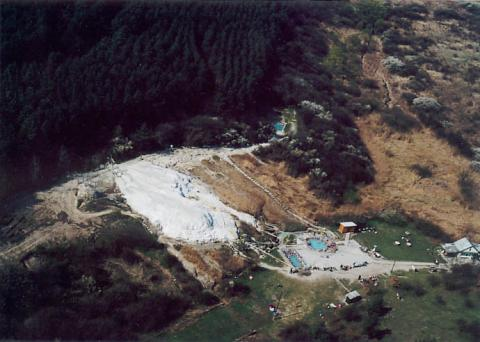
- Aerial view of hot springs and spa complex

- Flag Coat of arms

- Location of Egerszalók in Hungary
- Coordinates: 47°52′N 20°20′E
- Country: Hungary
- Region: Northern Hungary
- County: Heves
- District: Eger

Area
  - Total: 23.11 km^{2} (8.92 sq mi)

Population (2015)
  - Total: 1,981
  - Density: 85.72/km^{2} (222.0/sq mi)
- Time zone: UTC+1 (CET)
  - Summer (DST): UTC+2 (CEST)
- Postal code: 3394
- Area code: +36 36
- KSH code: 24758
- Website: www.egerszalok.hu

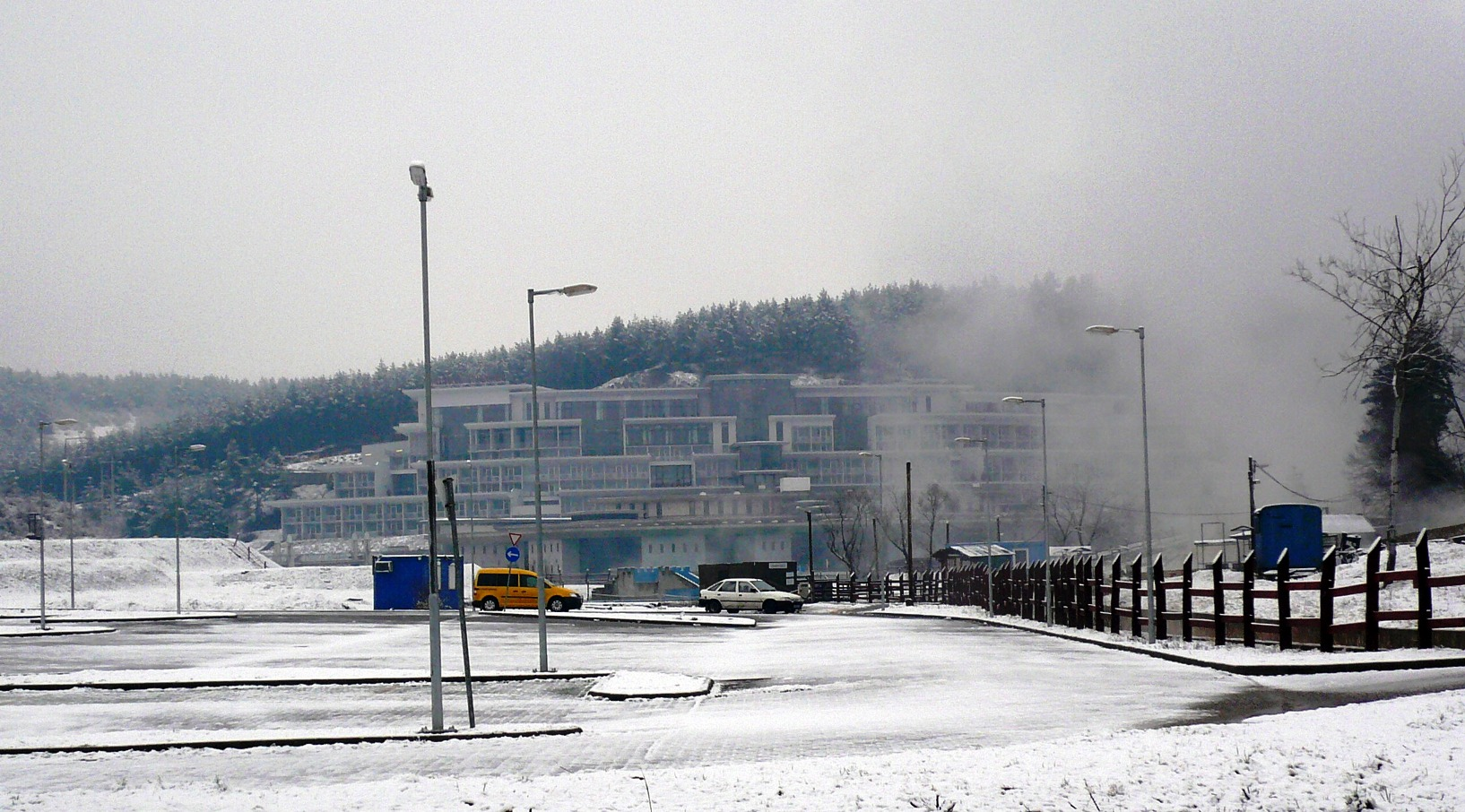
SALIRIS Resort

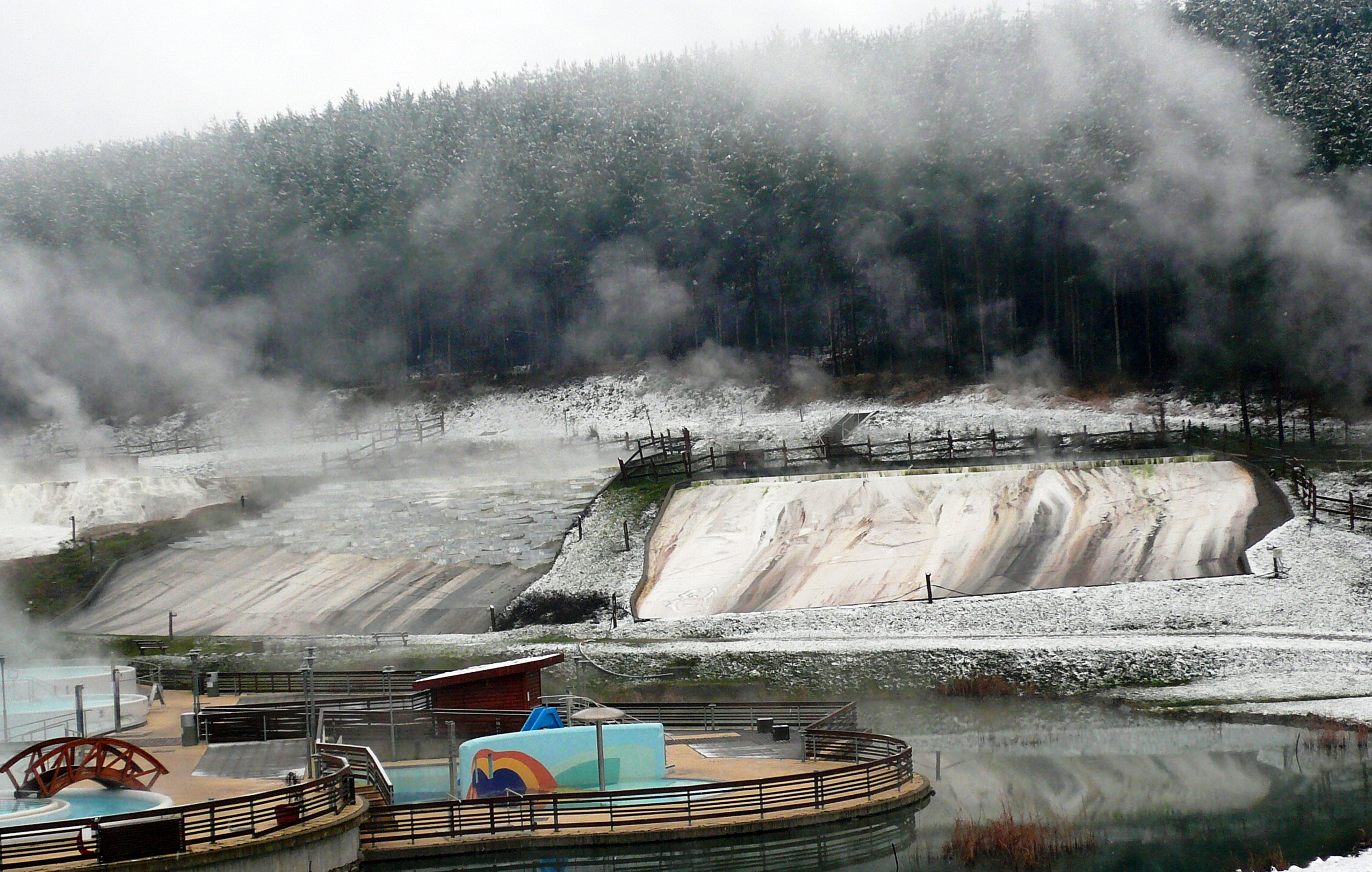
Travertine

Egerszalók is an open-air spa and village in Heves County in northeastern Hungary. The springs yield 68 °C. mineral water from an aquifer located under the volcanic Mátra Mountains. The spa is located 8 km west of the county seat of Eger, from which it is served by motorbus.

Egerszalok lies 133 km from Budapest, in the Laskó stream valley between the Mátra and Bükk ranges. The village can be easily reached from the M3 highway.

== Description ==
The historical and geographical associations of Egerszalók have made it a favourite spa in Hungary. The area's waters have been in use since the 1730s, although the current spa only came into operation in 1961. Before entering the spa pools, the steaming water runs down a series of cascades backed and lined with travertine; the gleaming mineral has precipitated from the water as it interacts with air at atmospheric temperatures. The travertine is locally called "salt," and the cascade of water is called "Salt Hill."

Not all of the dissolved solids precipitate. The Egerszalók spa pools contain water rich in calcium, magnesium, and hydrocarbonate minerals. A total of 17 outdoor and indoor pools comprise a total water surface area of 1,900 m².

Surrounding the springs are pine trees, apple trees, and a grove of the beeches for which the nearby Bükk Mountains are known. The region grows Egri Bikavér wine, sometimes called bull's blood wine in English, and spa visitors sometimes enjoy the terroir experience by bathing in the spa and drinking the wine.

The spa is physically connected to the adjacent Salaris Resort Spa and Conference Hotel. For non-guests, admission is charged to the spa. A section of the hot springs has been officially signed and set aside for naturists.

== See also ==
- Szalók (genus)
