= Julius I Rátót =

Hungarian baron and landowner

Julius (I) Rátót
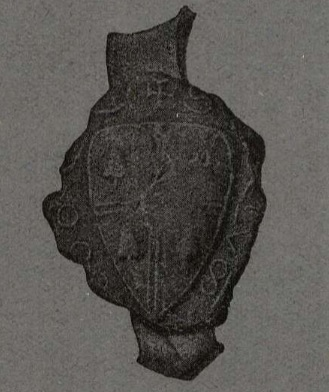
- Seal of Julius Rátót (1236)

Judge royal
- Reign: 1219–1221; 1235–1239
- Predecessor: Atyusz Atyusz (1st term); Ladislaus Kán (2nd term)
- Successor: Bánk Bár-Kalán (1st term); Andrew, son of Serafin (2nd term)
- Born: Unknown
- Died: 1239
- Noble family: gens Rátót
- Issue: none
- Father: Leustach I

Julius (I) from the kindred Rátót (Hungarian: Rátót nembeli (I.) Gyula; died 1239) was a powerful Hungarian baron and landowner, who held several secular positions during the reign of kings Andrew II and Béla IV. He was the founder of the gens Rátót's economical and political power.

He was the second son of Leustach Rátót, who served as voivode of Transylvania from 1176 to 1196. As Julius I had no descendants, his brother Rathold, ispán (comes) of Somogy County carried on the clan's name through his two sons.

His influence arose during the reign of Andrew II. He served as ispán of Nyitra County in 1214. He functioned as judge royal between 1219 and 1221, besides that he also served as ispán of Keve County. He lost the office during the constitutional crisis around the Golden Bull of 1222. After that he held several county functions: he was the ispán of Moson (1221), Bihar (1222) and Vas Counties (1225).

Julius I was appointed voivode of Transylvania in 1229. During that time, he joined to the liege of prince Béla, who became duke of Transylvania in 1226, following the agreement between the king and his son after a series of conflicts for the throne. The fact could be played a role in his betrayal that his cousin, Matthias Rátót, who functioned as provost of Zagreb, held the dignity of chancellor for Béla, future king of Hungary. Julius served as voivode until 1231. It is plausible he is identical with that "Iula", mentioned by a charter of Innocent, Bishop of Syrmia in November 1233, who served as Ban of Severin. He held the dignity perhaps until 1235. When Béla IV ascended the throne in 1235, Julius was appointed judge royal for the second time and remained in office until his death in 1239. Besides that he also served as ispán of Csanád (1235) and Keve Counties (1236–1238).

== Sources ==
- Engel, Pál (2001). The Realm of St Stephen: A History of Medieval Hungary, 895-1526. I.B. Tauris Publishers. ISBN 1-86064-061-3.
- (in Hungarian) Markó, László (2006). A magyar állam főméltóságai Szent Istvántól napjainkig – Életrajzi Lexikon ("The High Officers of the Hungarian State from Saint Stephen to the Present Days – A Biographical Encyclopedia") (2nd edition); Helikon Kiadó Kft., Budapest; ISBN 963-547-085-1.
- (in Hungarian) Zsoldos, Attila (2011). Magyarország világi archontológiája, 1000–1301 ("Secular Archontology of Hungary, 1000–1301"). História, MTA Történettudományi Intézete. Budapest. ISBN 978-963-9627-38-3
- Zsoldos, Attila (2016). "Béla erdélyi herceg bárói [The Barons of Béla, Duke of Transylvania]". In Dáné, Veronika; Lupescu-Makó, Mária; Sipos, Gábor (eds.). Testimonio litterarum. Tanulmányok Jakó Zsigmond tiszteletére (in Hungarian). Erdélyi Múzeum Egyesület. pp. 441–449. ISBN 978-606-739-054-4.

Julius I Genus Rátót Born: ? Died: 1239
Political offices
Preceded by Atyusz Atyusz	Judge royal 1219–1221	Succeeded by Bánk Bár-Kalán
Preceded by Pousa, son of Sólyom	Voivode of Transylvania; 1229–1231	Succeeded by Denis Türje
Preceded by Lucas	Ban of Severin; 1233–1235?	Succeeded by Pous Csák
Preceded by Ladislaus Kán	Judge royal 1235–1239	Succeeded by Andrew, son of Serafin
