= Szentgyörgyi =

Noble family of the Kingdom of Hungary in the 13th to 16th centuries

The Szentgyörgyi, also Szentgyörgyi és Bazini, was a noble family of the Kingdom of Hungary in the 13th to 16th centuries. The ancestor of the family, Thomas descended from the gens ("clan") Hont-Pázmány and he was the head (ispán) of Nyitra County around 1208. The family was named after its two castles, Szentgyörgy (Slovak: Biely Kameň, German: Sankt Georgen) and Bazin (Slovak: Pezinok, German: Bösing), built in the 12th century. The possession of the castles ensured that the family could maintain its aristocratic status even among the anarchic conditions of the kingdom during the period between 1290 and 1320. In 1459, the members of the family became counts of the Holy Roman Empire; and afterwards, they were mentioned as counts even in documents issued by the Kings of Hungary although this title was not recognised in the kingdom at that time.

== See also ==
- List of titled noble families in the Kingdom of Hungary

== Sources ==
- Markó, László: A magyar állam főméltóságai Szent Istvántól napjainkig - Életrajzi Lexikon (means: "The High Officers of the Hungarian State from Saint Stephen to the Present Days - A Biographical Encyclopedia"); Magyar Könyvklub, 2000, Budapest; ISBN 963-547-085-1.
- Engel, Pál: Magyarország világi archontológiája (1301-1457) (means: "The Temporal Archontology of Hungary (1301-1457)"); História - MTA Történettudományi Intézete, 1996, Budapest; ISBN 963-8312-43-2.
